= Grumbach (disambiguation) =

Grumbach is a municipality in Rhineland-Palatinate, Germany.

Grumbach may also refer to:

- Grumbach, Bad Langensalza, a village in Thuringia, Germany
- Grumbach (surname)
- Grumbach (Innerste), a river of Lower Saxony, Germany, tributary of the Innerste
- Grumbach (Werra), a river of Thuringia, Germany, tributary of the Werra

== See also ==
- Grumbacher, an American manufacturer of art materials
