= 2006 Trincomalee massacre of NGO workers =

Massacre of humanitarian workers in Muttur, Sri Lanka, 2006

Coordinates: 8.566°N 81.233°E

2006 Trincomalee Massacre of NGO Workers
- Part of the Sri Lankan Civil War
- Muttur (Sri Lanka)
- Location: Muttur, Sri Lanka
- Date: 4 August 2006
- Target: Sri Lankan Tamil employees of Action Against Hunger
- Attack type: Armed massacre
- Weapon: Automatic rifles
- Deaths: 17
- Perpetrator: Sri Lankan security forces

The Muttur Massacre was an incident that occurred on 4 August 2006 in Muttur, Sri Lanka, in the district of Trincomalee, during the Sri Lankan civil war. Seventeen local employees of the French non-governmental organization Action Against Hunger were executed at close range inside their office. The victims were all local workers: sixteen of Sri Lankan Tamil ethnicity – including four women – and one Sri Lankan Moor, aged between 23 and 36.

The massacre is considered one of the most serious ever committed against humanitarian workers in the history of NGOs. Years later, no one has ever been prosecuted or convicted for this crime. The Sri Lanka Monitoring Mission, United Nations Human Rights Council and University Teachers for Human Rights all hold the Sri Lankan security forces responsible for the massacre.

== Background ==
=== Action Against Hunger's presence in Sri Lanka ===
Action Against Hunger had been present in Sri Lanka since 1996 and had been operating in Muttur since 2001, running programmes in water, hygiene, sanitation and food security for the most vulnerable populations in the north-east of the country.

When the Indian Ocean tsunami devastated the Sri Lankan coastline on 26 December 2004, the organisation immediately intensified its operations: it mobilised over 16 million euros in private funds, dispatched 150 tonnes of supplies and worked to restore access to drinking water for survivors. The seventeen employees killed at Muttur were still there to carry on that mission.

=== The armed conflict ===
Between 1983 and 2009, Sri Lanka was torn by a civil war between the national government and the Liberation Tigers of Tamil Eelam (LTTE), a separatist movement fighting for an independent state in the north and east of the country. The conflict caused more than 100,000 deaths over more than two decades.

By 2006, the war was at its most acute. Trincomalee and Muttur, in the north-east, were highly militarised zones, with intense bombardment, mass displacement of civilians and the simultaneous presence of the regular army, the LTTE and paramilitary groups.

== The days of the massacre ==
On 1 August 2006, the Tamil Tigers attacked and seized control of Muttur. The government army responded with bombardments. Thousands of civilians fled the town.

The seventeen Action Against Hunger workers remained in their office. On 3 August, the International Committee of the Red Cross organised an evacuation attempt, which ongoing fighting prevented. That evening, the staff hung flags and stuck stickers bearing the organisation's logo on every surface of the building to clearly signal their presence as humanitarian workers. The Trincomalee police confirmed that the security forces in the area were aware of their presence.

On 4 August, the army announced that it had retaken control of Muttur. At 7 a.m., contact with the seventeen colleagues was lost. A land evacuation was organised, but the convoy was stopped at a military checkpoint ten kilometres from the town.

On 6 August, after numerous attempts, Action Against Hunger staff managed to access the Muttur office. They found the first fifteen bodies inside, face down, still wearing the organisation's T-shirts, with gunshot wounds to the head and neck. According to testimonies gathered in subsequent investigations, the victims had been forced to kneel and had begged for their lives before being shot at close range. Two further bodies were subsequently found in a nearby vehicle. On 7 August, all seventeen bodies were transferred to Trincomalee hospital.

== The victims ==
The seventeen victims were all local employees of Action Against Hunger, aged between 23 and 36. Their names:

M. Narmathan, I. Muralitharan, R. Arulrajah, T. Pratheeban, A. Jaseelan, G. Kavitha, K. Kovarthani, V. Kokilavathani, S. Romila, M. Ketheswaran, M. Rishikesan, S.P. Anantharajah, G. Sritharan, S. Koneswaran, S. Ganesh, Y. Kodeeswaran and A.L.M. Jawffar.

They came from the same communities they were serving and were an experienced team, recognised for their work following the 2004 tsunami.

== Reactions ==
=== Sri Lanka Monitoring Mission ===
The Sri Lankan government denied any responsibility for the events. The Sri Lanka Monitoring Mission (SLMM) reached the opposite conclusion, however, holding the Sri Lankan Army responsible for the killings and stating that it was convinced "that there cannot be any other armed groups than the security forces who could actually have been behind the act". The SLMM put forward three reasons for this conclusion: security forces had been present in Muttur at the time of the killings; the government had barred monitors from the site immediately after the bodies were discovered; and confidential conversations with "highly reliable sources" had pointed to the responsibility of the security forces.

The outgoing head of the Mission, retired Swedish Colonel Ulf Henricsson, described the events as "one of the most serious recent crimes against humanitarian aid workers worldwide".

=== Action Against Hunger and the international community ===
Action Against Hunger termed the events a war crime, on the grounds that the massacre had targeted clearly identifiable humanitarian workers, in violation of the Geneva Conventions which guarantee the protection of civilians and humanitarian personnel in armed conflicts. It coordinated a joint statement with twenty-seven other organisations calling on the Sri Lankan government to bring those responsible to justice.

Jan Egeland, then United Nations Emergency Relief Coordinator, described the victims as "humanitarian workers who paid with their lives for their good intentions".

== Investigation ==
=== National proceedings ===
On 15 August 2006, an initial investigation was opened at the Magistrate's Court, the competent national court of first instance. On 12 September 2006, Action Against Hunger lodged a complaint with the National Human Rights Commission in Trincomalee.

The judicial proceedings were marred by numerous irregularities: no witnesses came forward, the public and press were barred from hearings, and international observers were prevented from attending. In October, at the request of investigators, the bodies were exhumed to recover the bullets and conduct a ballistics analysis.

=== The Presidential Commission and the IIGEP ===
In November 2006, President Mahinda Rajapaksa established a Presidential Commission of Inquiry tasked with examining sixteen cases of serious human rights violations, including, as case number two, the Muttur massacre. A group of bilateral donors negotiated in parallel the creation of a group of International Independent Eminent Persons (IIGEP), invited to observe the Commission's work. Australia nominated its own eminent person.

The IIGEP was critical of the Commission, finding that proceedings did not meet international standards of transparency and that victims' families were denied information and access to hearings.

In July 2009, the Commission concluded that "neither the Army nor the Navy were present in the sector where the massacre was committed", ruling out the responsibility of the national armed forces. This conclusion has been disputed by numerous international organisations and by Action Against Hunger itself.

=== Action Against Hunger's withdrawal from Sri Lanka ===
In 2008, faced with the ineffectiveness and lack of cooperation of the authorities, Action Against Hunger decided to end its mission in Sri Lanka and withdraw its collaboration from the national investigations. The organisation made public all the obstacles it had encountered and formally called for the opening of an independent international investigation.

=== The UTHR report ===
On 1 April 2008, the organisation University Teachers for Human Rights (UTHR), founded by former academics at the University of Jaffna and known for its positions critical of both the LTTE and the Sri Lankan government, published its "Special Report No. 30", devoted exclusively to the massacre. The document names as perpetrators one member of the Sri Lanka Home Guard – subsequently renamed the Civil Defence Force – and two police constables from the Muttur Police Station, adding that several Sri Lanka Navy Special Forces personnel entered the organisation's compound and remained passive while the staff were killed.

Human Rights Watch described the report as "a brilliant piece of investigative work" and stated that the government's investigations into the massacre were "little more than a sick joke played on the victims' families and the international community".

=== The UN international investigation ===
In 2014, partly as a result of pressure from Action Against Hunger and other NGOs, the United Nations Human Rights Council launched an independent international investigation. The 2015 report confirmed that the evidence pointed to Sri Lankan security forces as responsible for the massacre and proposed the establishment of an international Special Court. The Sri Lankan authorities refused.

In 2019, Sri Lanka's Attorney General, Dappula de Livera, ordered police to accelerate the investigation into the massacre. No criminal proceedings have ever been brought against any suspect.

In 2021, Action Against Hunger brought the Muttur case before the United Nations Security Council. United Nations experts have reiterated on multiple occasions that those responsible have never been "arrested, prosecuted and punished".

== Impunity ==
No one has ever been prosecuted or convicted for the Muttur Massacre. Action Against Hunger has documented the main stages of its pursuit of justice:

- 2006: coordination of a joint statement by 28 NGOs addressed to the Sri Lankan government.
- 2006–2008: participation in national investigations, subsequently abandoned due to lack of independence and transparency.
- 2008: withdrawal from Sri Lanka and public call for an international investigation.
- 2012: petition for the opening of an independent United Nations investigation.
- 2013: publication of a document identifying Sri Lankan security forces as responsible.
- 2014: launch of the international investigation by the UN Human Rights Council.
- 2015: the UN report confirms the responsibility of the security forces; the proposal for an international Special Court is rejected by Sri Lanka.
- 2021: the case is brought before the UN Security Council.

The Muttur Massacre is part of a broader pattern of deliberate violence against humanitarian personnel, a phenomenon that has been growing steadily since the 2000s and is documented annually by international organisations. In response to this trend, Action Against Hunger supports the international Not a Target campaign for the recognition and protection of humanitarian workers in conflict zones.

== Documentary ==
In 2007, Maximal Productions and the French television channel France 5 produced the 52-minute documentary Muttur: un crime contre l'humanitaire (Muttur: A Crime Against Humanitarian Aid). The film won the Prix Albert-Londres – the most prestigious award in French-language journalism – for journalists Anne Poiret, Gwenlaouen Le Gouil and Fabrice Launay.

== See also ==
- Action Against Hunger
- Sri Lankan civil war
- Liberation Tigers of Tamil Eelam
- International humanitarian law
- Geneva Conventions
- War crime
- Jan Egeland
- Mahinda Rajapaksa
- 2004 Indian Ocean earthquake and tsunami
- Human Rights Watch
- United Nations Human Rights Council
- Prix Albert-Londres
- Kunduz hospital airstrike

== Bibliography ==
- "Sri Lanka: The Muttur massacre – a struggle for justice". ReliefWeb / Action Against Hunger.
- "Twenty Years of Make-Believe: Sri Lanka's Commissions of Inquiry". legal-tools.org.
