= Delphine Saubaber =

French journalist (born 1978)

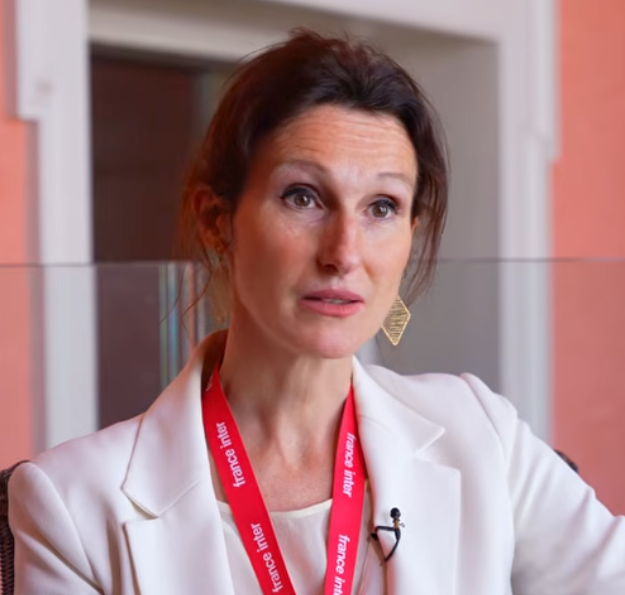
- In a 2026 interview
- Born: 1978 (age 47–48); Agen, France
- Education: Institut d'études politiques de Paris
- Occupation: Journalist
- Awards: Albert Londres Prize (2010)

Delphine Saubaber (born 1978) is a French journalist.

== Career ==
Saubader is a graduate of the Institut d'études politiques de Paris (1999) and of the Centre de formation des journalistes of Paris.

She performed her first internship at the Sud Ouest agency in Agen. She then worked for Le Monde, before joining the world service at L'Express as senior reporter.

In 2010, Saubader was awarded the Albert Londres Prize.

== Works ==
- 2011: with Henri Haget (2011). Vies de mafia. Stock document. Paris: Stock. p. 258. ISBN 978-2-234-06458-4. OCLC 758613712.
- 2016: with Tran To Nga. Le Pays empoisonné. Paris: Stock. p. 250.
