= Hauter =

Hauter is a surname. Notable people with the surname include:

- François Hauter (born 1951), French reporter
- Rolf Hauter, South African Navy officer
- Wenonah Hauter (born 1954), American environmentalist
