= Betzdorf, Luxembourg =

Betzdorf Betzder (Luxembourgish)
- Commune
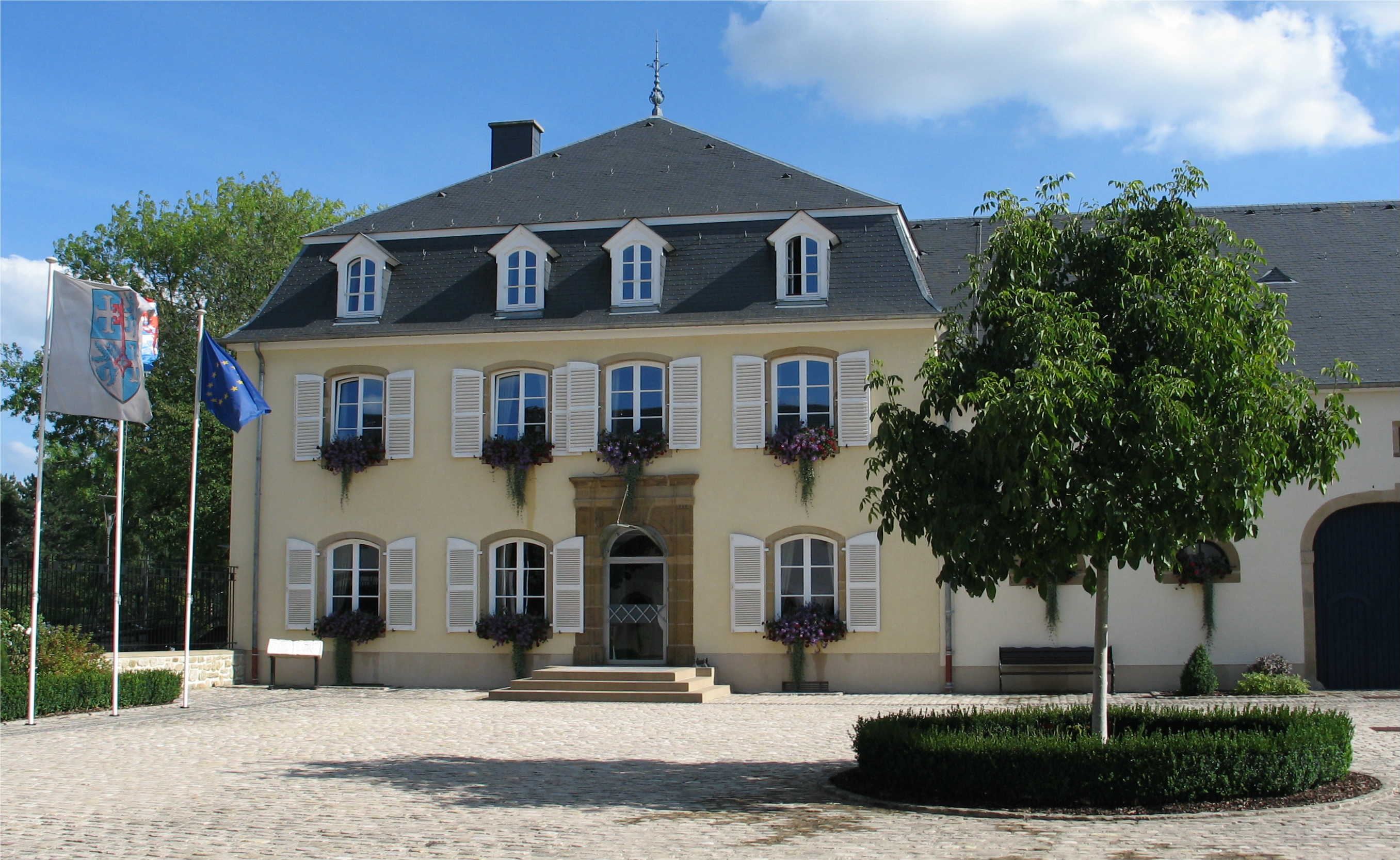
- Town hall

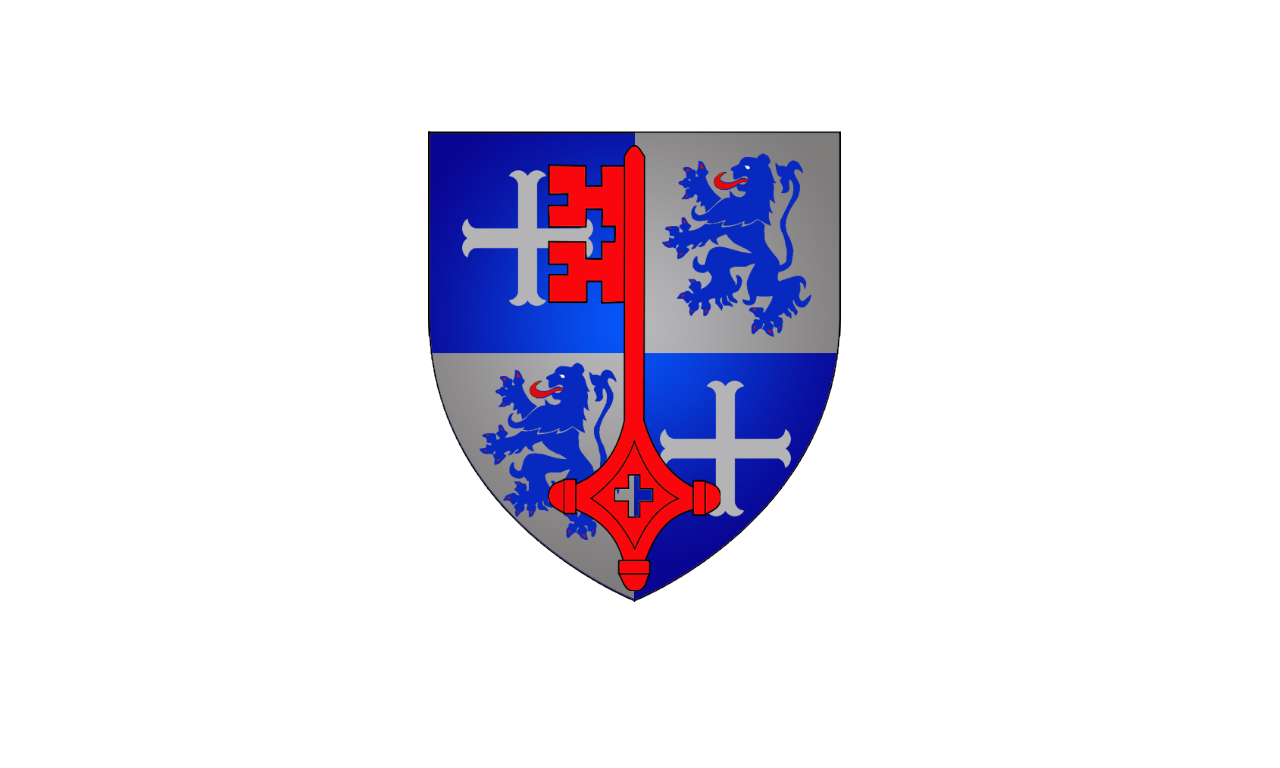
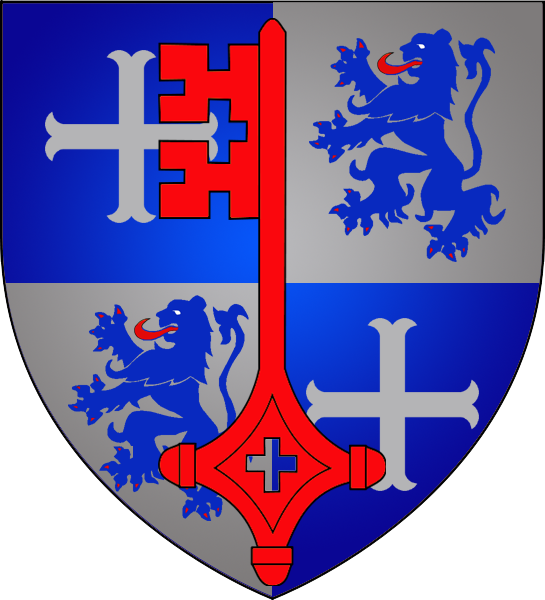
- Flag Coat of arms

- Map of Luxembourg with Betzdorf highlighted in orange, and the canton in dark red
- Coordinates: 49.6875°N 6.35°E
- Country: Luxembourg
- Canton: Grevenmacher

Government
  - Mayor: Marc Ries (CSV)

Area
  - Total: 26.08 km^{2} (10.07 sq mi)
  - Rank: 34th of 100
- Highest elevation: 358 m (1,175 ft)
  - Rank: 79th of 100
- Lowest elevation: 218 m (715 ft)
  - Rank: 34th of 100

Population (2025)
  - Total: 4,071
  - Rank: 45th of 100
  - Density: 156.1/km^{2} (404.3/sq mi)
  - Rank: 52nd of 100
- Time zone: UTC+1 (CET)
  - Summer (DST): UTC+2 (CEST)
- LAU 2: LU0001101
- Website: betzdorf.lu

Betzdorf (German pronunciation: [ˈbɛtsdɔʁf]; Luxembourgish: Betzder [ˈbætsdɐ]) is a commune and town in the canton of Grevenmacher, in eastern Luxembourg.

As of September 2026, the town of Betzdorf, which lies in the north-east of the commune, has a population of 297 inhabitants. Other settlements within the commune include the commune's administrative centre, Berg, as well as Mensdorf, Olingen, and Roodt-sur-Syre.

Betzdorf Castle is the birthplace of Grand Duke Henri and is now the headquarters of SES, the world's largest satellite operator in terms of revenue and one of the four largest components of the Luxembourg Stock Exchange's main LuxX Index.

== Population ==
Historical population

Year	Pop.	±%
1821	1,153	—
1851	1,568	+36.0%
1900	1,352	−13.8%
1910	1,372	+1.5%
1922	1,346	−1.9%
1935	1,366	+1.5%

Year	Pop.	±%
1947	1,314	−3.8%
1960	1,365	+3.9%
1970	1,530	+12.1%
1981	1,654	+8.1%
1990	1,972	+19.2%
2000	2,289	+16.1%

Year	Pop.	±%
2005	2,583	+12.8%
2010	3,196	+23.7%
2015	3,578	+12.0%
2020	4,093	+14.4%
2021	4,149	+1.4%

Source data

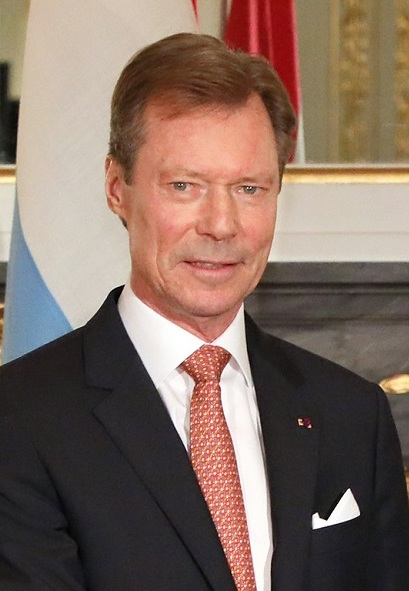
Henri, Grand Duke of Luxembourg, 2019

== Notable people ==
- Bernard Molitor (1755–1833), a Luxembourgish cabinet-maker.

=== Aristocracy ===
- Archduchess Marie-Astrid of Austria (born 1954), her father's eldest child
- Henri, Grand Duke of Luxembourg (born 1955), Grand Duke of Luxembourg.
- Princess Margaretha of Liechtenstein (born 1957), princess of two current realms

== List of mayors ==
Name	Start	End
Jean Engel	1800	1807
Jean Baptiste Weidert	1808	1816
Peter Erpelding	1816	1823
Hubert Petry	1823	1843
François Hoffmann Snr.	1844	1854
Nicolas Erpelding	1855	1870
Christophe Weber	1871	1888
Nikolas Metzdorf	1889	1901
François Hoffmann Jnr.	1902	1908
Johann-Peter Heinen	1909	1930
Jean Barthel	1930	1947 (Note: Mayor in name only under Nazi occupation (1940 - 1944))
Maurice Meyer	1947	1954
Jean-Pierre Mangen	1954	1963
Jean-Pierre Dondelinger	1964	1975
Guy Engel	1976	1981
René Muller	1982	1987
Rhett Sinner	1988	1999
Marie-Josée Frank	2000	2011
Rhett Sinner	2011	2014
Edgar Arendt	2014	2017
Jean-François Wirtz	2017	2023
Marc Ries	2023	present
