= Benjamin Barthe =

French journalist (born 1972)

Benjamin Barthe (born 1972) is a French journalist.

== Biography ==
Benjamin was born in Senlis. After studying history, Barthe joined the Centre de formation des journalistes in Paris and graduated in 1996.

He began his career as a collaborator of the Egyptian magazine Al-Ahram as part of his national cooperation service, before joining the regional daily La Provence in 1998, then the communist daily L'Humanité (1999–2001), and eventually Le Nouvel Observateur (2001–2002).

As a correspondent in Ramallah, the administrative capital of the Palestinian Authority, of the weekly L'Express and the daily Le Monde, he also collaborates with televisions and radios: RFI, RSR, RTBF, France Culture, TV5Monde and ITV.

After having two children with his wife, the Palestinian activist Muzna Shihabi, he came back to France, and then went to Lebanon in 2014, as a correspondent for Le Monde in the Middle East. He wrote mostly about Syria from 2014 to 2019; then, with the Lebanese revolution, he started writing articles about Lebanon, and its economic crisis.

In 2021, he left Lebanon with his family and went to Paris, where he stopped writing as the Le Monde correspondent for the Middle East. He did not stop writing in Le Monde, as he still publishes articles. Since 2021 he has also been the 'chef adjoint' of Le Monde's international service.

== Prizes ==
In May 2008, Benjamin Barthe was awarded the Prix Albert-Londres for his articles on the Gaza Strip published in Le Monde and L'Express between April 2007 and January 2008.
