= Landivisiau =

Landivisiau Landivizio
- Commune
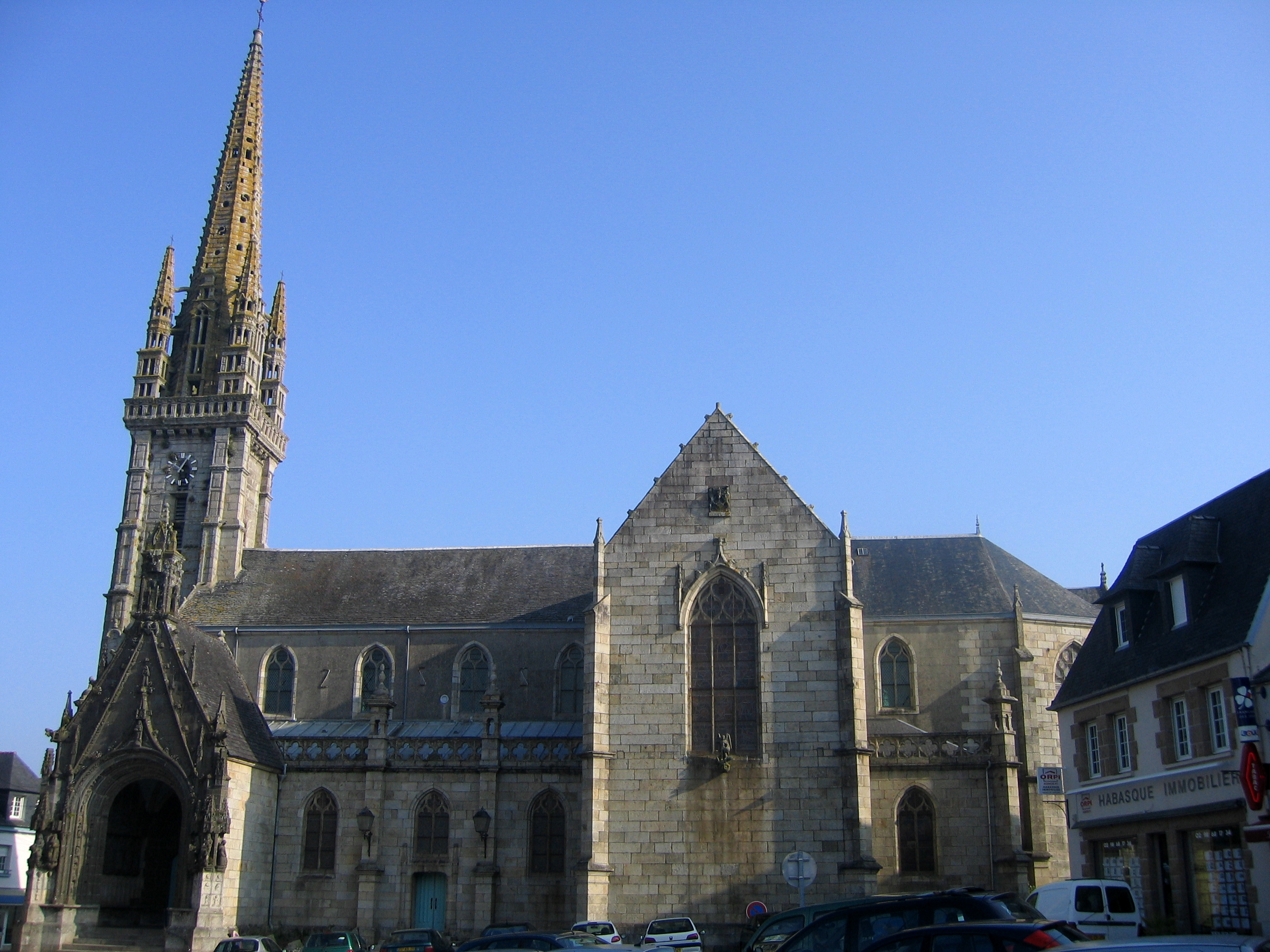
- The church in Landivisiau

- Flag Coat of arms
- Location of Landivisiau
- Location within France Location within Brittany
- Coordinates: 48°30′36″N 4°04′01″W
- Country: France
- Region: Brittany
- Department: Finistère
- Arrondissement: Morlaix
- Canton: Landivisiau
- Intercommunality: Pays de Landivisiau

Government
  - Mayor (2020–2026): Laurence Claisse
- Area^{1}: 18.98 km^{2} (7.33 sq mi)
- Highest elevation: 126 m (413 ft)
- Lowest elevation: 32 m (105 ft)
- Population (2023): 9,426
  - Density: 496.6/km^{2} (1,286/sq mi)
- Time zone: UTC+01:00 (CET)
  - Summer (DST): UTC+02:00 (CEST)
- INSEE/Postal code: 29105 /29400
- ^{1} French Land Register data, which excludes lakes, ponds, glaciers > 1 km^{2} (0.386 sq mi or 247 acres) and river estuaries.

Landivisiau (French pronunciation: [lɑ̃divizjo]; Breton: Landivizio) is a commune in the Finistère department of Brittany in north-western France. The journalist Luc Le Vaillant, winner of the 1998 Albert Londres Prize was born in Landivisiau. Landivisiau is twinned with Bideford in north Devon.

== Geography ==
=== Climate ===
Landivisiau has an oceanic climate (Köppen climate classification Cfb). The average annual temperature in Landivisiau is 11.6 °C (52.9 °F). The average annual rainfall is 1,160.4 mm (45.69 in) with December as the wettest month. The temperatures are highest on average in August, at around 17.0 °C (62.6 °F), and lowest in January and February, at around 6.9 °C (44.4 °F). The highest temperature ever recorded in Landivisiau was 39.3 °C (102.7 °F) on 18 July 2022; the coldest temperature ever recorded was −9.1 °C (15.6 °F) on 13 January 1987.

Climate data for Landivisiau (1991–2020 normals, extremes 1966–present)
Month	Jan	Feb	Mar	Apr	May	Jun	Jul	Aug	Sep	Oct	Nov	Dec	Year
Record high °C (°F)	16.8 (62.2)	21.3 (70.3)	23.8 (74.8)	27.0 (80.6)	29.6 (85.3)	33.0 (91.4)	39.3 (102.7)	35.3 (95.5)	31.3 (88.3)	28.3 (82.9)	21.5 (70.7)	19.0 (66.2)	39.3 (102.7)
Mean daily maximum °C (°F)	9.4 (48.9)	9.8 (49.6)	11.7 (53.1)	13.7 (56.7)	16.5 (61.7)	18.9 (66.0)	20.7 (69.3)	20.9 (69.6)	19.2 (66.6)	15.9 (60.6)	12.3 (54.1)	10.0 (50.0)	14.9 (58.8)
Daily mean °C (°F)	6.9 (44.4)	6.9 (44.4)	8.4 (47.1)	9.9 (49.8)	12.6 (54.7)	15.1 (59.2)	16.9 (62.4)	17.0 (62.6)	15.3 (59.5)	12.7 (54.9)	9.6 (49.3)	7.5 (45.5)	11.6 (52.9)
Mean daily minimum °C (°F)	4.4 (39.9)	4.1 (39.4)	5.1 (41.2)	6.1 (43.0)	8.7 (47.7)	11.2 (52.2)	13.0 (55.4)	13.1 (55.6)	11.5 (52.7)	9.5 (49.1)	6.9 (44.4)	4.9 (40.8)	8.2 (46.8)
Record low °C (°F)	−9.1 (15.6)	−6.9 (19.6)	−5.7 (21.7)	−1.8 (28.8)	−1.0 (30.2)	3.0 (37.4)	5.8 (42.4)	6.3 (43.3)	3.5 (38.3)	−2.5 (27.5)	−7.6 (18.3)	−8.3 (17.1)	−9.1 (15.6)
Average precipitation mm (inches)	140.2 (5.52)	115.8 (4.56)	77.9 (3.07)	84.6 (3.33)	72.2 (2.84)	63.0 (2.48)	64.1 (2.52)	65.7 (2.59)	72.5 (2.85)	118.0 (4.65)	135.2 (5.32)	151.2 (5.95)	1,160.4 (45.69)
Average precipitation days (≥ 1.0 mm)	17.4	15.1	13.3	12.7	10.2	9.2	10.6	10.1	10.6	15.1	17.3	18.1	159.7
Mean monthly sunshine hours	60.3	73.8	110.3	142.9	170.5	183.1	168.5	165.1	154.3	105.0	68.2	61.6	1,463.4
Source: Météo France (sun 1991-2009)

== Landivisiau Naval Air Base ==
Landivisiau is home to the Landivisiau Naval Air Base. A squadron of 25× Air-Sol Moyenne Portée nuclear armed Rafale M from the French Navy is based at Landivisiau.

== International relations ==
It is twinned with Bideford in the southwest of the United Kingdom and Bad Sooden-Allendorf in Hesse, Germany.

== Population ==
Inhabitants of Landivisiau are called in French Landivisiens.

Historical population

Year	Pop.	±% p.a.
1793	2,360	—
1800	2,124	−1.49%
1806	2,690	+4.02%
1821	2,547	−0.36%
1831	2,853	+1.14%
1836	3,031	+1.22%
1841	3,217	+1.20%
1846	3,482	+1.60%
1851	3,420	−0.36%
1856	3,304	−0.69%
1861	3,317	+0.08%
1866	3,211	−0.65%
1872	3,203	−0.04%
1876	3,359	+1.20%
1881	3,706	+1.99%
1886	4,002	+1.55%
1891	4,079	+0.38%
1896	4,240	+0.78%
1901	4,354	+0.53%

Year	Pop.	±% p.a.
1906	4,385	+0.14%
1911	4,713	+1.45%
1921	4,647	−0.14%
1926	4,544	−0.45%
1931	4,543	−0.00%
1936	4,518	−0.11%
1946	5,445	+1.88%
1954	4,926	−1.24%
1962	5,583	+1.58%
1968	6,174	+1.69%
1975	7,605	+3.02%
1982	7,964	+0.66%
1990	8,254	+0.45%
1999	8,751	+0.65%
2007	8,831	+0.11%
2012	9,131	+0.67%
2017	9,132	+0.00%
2023	9,426	+0.53%

Source: EHESS and INSEE (1968-2023)

== Breton language ==
In 2008, 7.11% of primary-school children attended bilingual schools, where Breton language is taught alongside French.

== See also ==
- Communes of the Finistère department
- List of the works of Bastien and Henry Prigent
- Maurice Le Scouëzec
