= Daech, les enfants fantômes =

- Directed by: Hélène Lam Trong
- Written by: Hélène Lam Trong
- Produced by: Cinétévé; Fabienne Servan-Schreiber; Estelle Mauriac
- Cinematography: Bernard Jalet
- Edited by: Soline Braun
- Production company: Cinétévé
- Distributed by: France 5
- Release date: 2023
- Running time: 72 minutes
- Country: France
- Language: French

Daech, les enfants fantômes is a documentary written and directed by Hélène Lam Trong, released in 2023. She received the Albert Londres Prize of audiovisual.

== Synopsis ==
In 2019 some 500 French children were discovered to be enduring harsh conditions in Syrian prisons, a clear violation of child protection laws. Despite pleas from their families, the French government refused to repatriate them. In January 2023, the UN condemned France for this stance, echoing previous condemnations from 2022. The sole hope for these children rests with their families in France, who are advocating for their return. As of spring 2023, more than a hundred French children remain in precarious conditions in Syrian camps, their future uncertain. All this unfolds against a backdrop of mounting concerns about the resurgence of Daesh in the region.

== Distinction ==
- 2023: Albert Londres Prize
