= Albert Londres Prize =

Highest French journalism award

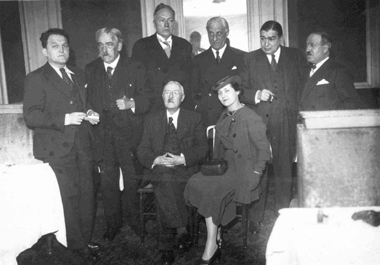
The first jury of the Albert-Londres Prize: Émile Condroyer, Charles Pettit, Ludovic Naudeau, Jacques de Marsillac, Louis Ronfaud, Maral Bureau, Pierre Mille, Florise Londres.

The Albert Londres Prize is the highest French journalism award, named in honor of journalist Albert Londres. Created in 1932, it was first awarded in 1933 and is considered the French equivalent of the Pulitzer Prize. Three laureates are awarded each year. The three categories are: "best reporter in the written press", "best audiovisual reporter" and "best reporting book".

== History ==
On the death of Albert Londres, on 16 May 1932, his daughter, Florise Martinet-Londres, decided to create an award in his memory. From 1933, the Albert Londres prize is awarded every year on 16 May to a young journalist under the age of forty.

Florise Martinet-Londres died in 1975. The Albert Londres Prize is administered by the Association of Albert Londres Prize, comprising the various winners. Chaired for 21 years by Henri Amouroux, it is chaired since May 2006 by Josette Alia. The prize is awarded by a jury of 19 journalists and winners of the previous year. In 1985, under the influence of Henri de Turenne, also a director, a prize was created for the audiovisual documentary. Since then, the association has been administered by the Civil Society of Multimedia Authors (SCAM), a grouping of authors of documentaries. In 2017, a prize was created for the "best reporting book".

== Laureates ==
=== Written word ===
- 1933: Émile Condroyer
- 1934: Stéphane Faugier
- 1935: Claude Blanchard
- 1936: Jean Botrot
- 1937: Max Massot
- 1938: Jean-Gérard Fleury
- 1939: Jacques Zimmermann
- 1946: Marcel Picard for J'étais un correspondant de guerre - Ed. Janicot
- 1947: André Blanchet for Débarquement à Haïphong - Ed. Dorian and Dominique Pado for Russie de Staline - Ed. Elvézir
- 1948: Pierre Voisin, Le Figaro
- 1949: Serge Bromberger, Le Figaro
- 1950: Alix d'Unienville for En vol - Albin Michel
- 1951: Henri de Turenne for Retour de Corée - Éditions Julliard
- 1952: Georges Menant, Le Dauphiné libéré
- 1953: Maurice Chanteloup, Le Figaro
- 1954: Armand Gatti for Envoyé spécial dans la cage aux fauves - Éditions du Seuil
- 1955: Jean Lartéguy, Paris-Presse
- 1956: René Mauriès, La Dépêche du Midi
- 1957: René Puissesseau, France Soir
- 1958: Max Olivier-Lacamp, Le Figaro
- 1959: Jean-Marc Théolleyre, Le Monde
- 1960: Jacques Jacquet-Francillon, Le Figaro
- 1961: Marcel Niedergang for Tempête sur le Congo - Ed. Plon
- 1962: Max Clos, Le Figaro
- 1963: Victor Franco for Cuba, La révolution sensuelle - Éditions Grasset
- 1964: José Hanu for Quand le vent souffle en Angola - Ed. Brepols
- 1965: Michel Croce-Spinelli, Sagipress
- 1966: Yves Courrière, Nice Matin
- 1967: Jean Bertolino, La Croix
- 1968: Yves Cuau for Israël attaque - Robert Laffont
- 1969: Yves-Guy Bergès, France Soir
- 1970: Philippe Nourry, Le Figaro
- 1971: Jean-François Delassus for Le Japon : monstre ou modèle - Hachette
- 1972: Jean-Claude Guillebaud, Sud Ouest and Pierre Bois (Le Figaro)
- 1973: Jean-Claude Pomonti, Le Monde
- 1974: François Missen, Le Provençal
- 1975: Thierry Desjardins, Le Figaro
- 1976: Pierre Veilletet, Sud Ouest
- 1977: François Debré for Cambodge, la révolution de la forêt - Flammarion
- 1978: Christian Hoche, L'Express
- 1979: Hervé Chabalier, Le Matin de Paris
- 1980: Marc Kravetz, Libération
- 1981: Bernard Guetta, Le Monde
- 1982: Christine Clerc for Le Bonheur d'être français - Grasset
- 1983: Patrick Meney, AFP
- 1984: Jean-Michel Caradec'h, Paris Match
- 1985: Alain Louyot, Le Point
- 1986: François Hauter, Le Figaro
- 1987: Jean-Paul Mari, Le Nouvel Observateur
- 1988: Sorj Chalandon, Libération and Samy Ketz (AFP)
- 1989: Jean Rolin for La ligne de front - Ed Quai Voltaire
- 1990: Yves Harté, Sud Ouest
- 1991: Patrick de Saint-Exupéry, Le Figaro
- 1992: Olivier Weber, Le Point
- 1993: Philippe Broussard, Le Monde
- 1994: Dominique le Guilledoux, Le Monde
- 1995: AFP's Moscow bureau (Jean Raffaelli, Boris Bachorz, Marielle Eudes, Paola Messana, Catherine Triomphe, Stéphane Orjollet, Sebastian Smith, Bertrand Rosenthal and Isabelle Astigarraga)
- 1996: Annick Cojean, Le Monde
- 1997: Caroline Puel, Libération, Le Point
- 1998: Luc Le Vaillant Libération
- 1999: Michel Moutot, AFP, New York
- 2000: Anne Nivat Ouest-France, Libération, Chienne de guerre, Ed. Fayard
- 2001: Serge Michel
- 2002: Adrien Jaulmes, Le Figaro
- 2003: Marion Van Renterghem, Le Monde
- 2004: Christophe Ayad, Libération
- 2005: Natalie Nougayrède, Le Monde
- 2006: Delphine Minoui, Le Figaro
- 2007: Luc Bronner, Le Monde
- 2008: Benjamin Barthe, Le Monde
- 2009: Sophie Bouillon, XXI
- 2010: Delphine Saubaber, L'Express
- 2011: Emmanuel Duparcq, AFP, Islamabad, Pakistan
- 2012: Alfred de Montesquiou Paris Match
- 2013: Doan Bui, Le Nouvel Observateur
- 2014: Philippe Pujol, La Marseillaise.
- 2015: Luc Mathieu, Libération.
- 2016: Claire Meynial, Le Point.
- 2017: Samuel Forey, Indépendant
- 2018: Élise Vincent, Le Monde
- 2019: Benoît Vitkine, Le Monde.
- 2020: Allan Kaval, Le Monde
- 2021: Caroline Hayek, L’Orient-Le Jour
- 2022: Margaux Benn, Le Figaro
- 2023: Wilson Fache
- 2024: Lorraine de Foucher, Le Monde
- 2025: Julie Brafman, Libération

=== Audiovisual ===
- 1985: Christophe De Ponfilly and Bertrand Gallet for les Combattants de l'insolence
- 1986: Philippe Rochot for his reporting about Lebanon
- 1987: Frédéric Laffont for la Guerre des nerfs
- 1988: Daniel Leconte for Barbie, sa deuxième vie
- 1989: Denis Vincenti and Patrick Schmitt for les Enfants de la honte
- 1990: Gilles de Maistre for J'ai 12 ans et je fais la guerre
- 1991: Dominique Tierce, Hervé Brusini and Jean-Marie Lequertier for l'Affaire Farewell (France 2)
- 1992: Lise Blanchet and Jean-Michel Destang for le Grand Shpountz (France 3, Thalassa)
- 1993: Jean-Jacques Le Garrec for 5 jours dans Sarajevo (France 2, Journal de 20h)
- 1994: Florence Dauchez for Rachida, lettres d'Algérie (les Films d'ici for France 3)
- 1995: Marie-Monique Robin for Voleurs d'yeux (Planète, M6)
- 1996: Patrick Boitet and Frédéric Tonolli for les Seigneurs de Behring (France 3)
- 1997: Claude Sempère for Envoyé spécial : La Corse (France 2)
- 1998: Catherine Jentile and Manuel Joachim for Chronique d'une tempête annoncée (TF1)
- 1999: Christophe Weber and Nicolas Glimois for les Blanchisseuses de Magdalen (France 3, Sunset presse)
- 2000: Rivoherizo Andriakoto for les Damnés de la terre (C9 Télévision, les Films du cyclope)
- 2001: Danielle Arbid for Seule avec la guerre (Movimento for Arte)
- 2002: Thierry and Jean-Xavier de Lestrade for la Justice des hommes (Maha productions)
- 2003: Bertrand Coq and Gilles Jacquier for Naplouse (France 2)
- 2004: Rithy Panh for S21, la machine de mort Khmère rouge (Arte, INA)
- 2005: Grégoire Deniau and Guillaume Martin for Traversée clandestine (France 2)
- 2006: Manon Loizeau and Alexis Marant for La Malédiction de naître fille (Capa for Arte, TSR and SRC)
- 2007: Anne Poiret, Gwenlaouen Le Gouil and Fabrice Launay for Muttur : un crime contre l'humanitaire (France 5)
- 2008: Alexis Monchovet, Stéphane Marchetti and Sébastien Mesquida for Rafah, chroniques d'une ville dans la bande de Gaza (Playprod and System TV for France 5)
- 2009: Alexandre Dereims for Han, le prix de la liberté (Java films and Première nouvelle for Public Sénat)
- 2010: Jean-Robert Viallet for La mise à mort du travail (France 3)
- 2011: David André for Une peine infinie, histoire d'un condamné à mort (France 2)
- 2012: Audrey Gallet and Alice Odiot for Zambie, à qui profite le cuivre ?.
- 2013: Roméo Langlois for Colombie : à balles réelles (France 24).
- 2014: Julien Fouchet, Sylvain Lepetit and Taha Siddiqui for La guerre de la polio (France 2).
- 2015: Delphine Deloget and Cécile Allegra for Voyage en barbarie (Public Sénat).
- 2016: Sophie Nivelle-Cardinale & Étienne Huver, for Disparus, la guerre invisible de Syrie (Arte).
- 2017: Tristan Waleckx & Matthieu Rénier, for Vincent Bolloré, un ami qui vous veut du bien ? (France 2).
- 2018: Marjolaine Grappe, Christophe Barreyre and Mathieu Cellard, for Les hommes des Kim (Les hommes du dictateur). (Arte).
- 2019: Marlène Rabaud for Congo Lucha (RTBF and BBC)
- 2020: Sylvain Louvet and Ludovic Gaillard (CAPA) for their documentary Sept milliards de suspects (Arte)
- 2021: Alex Gohari and Léo Mattei for their documentary On the Line. Les expulsés de l’Amérique
- 2022: Alexandra Jousset and Ksenia Bolchakova for their documentary Wagner, l’armée de l’ombre de Poutine
- 2023: Hélène Lam Trong for her documentary Daech, les enfants fantômes (France 5)
- 2024: Antoine Védeilhé and Germain Baslé for Philippines : les petits forçats de l’or (Arte)
- 2025: Jules Giraudat and Arthur Bouvart for Le Syndrome de La Havane (Canal +)

=== Book ===
- 2017: David Thomson, Les Revenants (Seuil, 2016).
- 2018: Jean-Baptiste Malet, L'Empire de l'or rouge. Enquête mondiale sur la tomate d'industrie (Fayard, 2017).
- 2019: Feurat Alani, Le Parfum d’Irak (Editions Nova/Arte Editions, 2018)
- 2020: Cédric Gras, Alpinistes de Staline (Stock)
- 2021: Émilienne Malfatto, Les serpents viendront pour toi (Les Arènes)
- 2022: Victor Castanet, Les Fossoyeurs : Révélations sur le système qui maltraite nos aînés (Fayard, 2022)
- 2023: Nicolas Legendre, Silence dans les champs (Arthaud)
- 2024: Martin Untersinger, Espionner, mentir, détruire (Grasset, 2024)
- 2025: Éléna Volochine, Propagande : l’arme de guerre de Vladimir Poutine (Autrement, 2025)
