= Grumbach (surname) =

Grumbach or von Grumbach is a surname. Notable people with the surname include:

- Antoine Grumbach, French architect
- Argula von Grumbach (1492–1554?), Bavarian noblewoman
- Detlef Grumbach (born 1955), German author and journalist
- Doris Grumbach (1918–2022), American novelist, biographer, literary critic, and essayist
- Kevin Grumbach, American physician and academic
- Melvin M. Grumbach (1925–2016), American pediatrician and academic
- Philippe Grumbach (1924–2003), French journalist and Soviet spy
- Wilhelm von Grumbach (1503–1567), German adventurer
