= Sophie Bouillon =

French journalist

Sophie Bouillon (born 1984, Vesoul) is a French journalist.

== Biography ==
She worked as a correspondent based in Johannesburg from 2008 to 2013 for Libération, Courrier International and Radio Télévision Suisse in particular, before working as a freelance reporter since 2014 (L'Observateur, Liberation, RTS, Europe 1, ...)., covering Boko Haram in Nigeria, series on Lagos, the war in eastern Congo in 2012. She also works on social issues in France (immigration, suburbs, prostitution ...).

A stringer, she won the 2009 Albert Londres prize for her article Bienvenue chez Mugabe ! (ill. by Sergio Aquindo), published in the magazine XXI.

== Publications ==
- 2013: Une vie de pintade en Afrique du Sud, Paris, Éditions Calmann-Lévy, series "Documents, Actualités, Société", 370 p. ISBN 978-2-7021-4497-8
- 2015: Elles, Les Prostituées et nous, Paris, Éditions Premier Parallèle, 120 p. ISBN 979-10-94841-08-2.

== Prizes and distinctions ==
- 2009: Prix Albert-Londres.
- 2014: 2ème Prix Bayeux en radio for Europe 1 (Les milices civiles face à Boko Haram)
