= Éclaibes =

- Commune
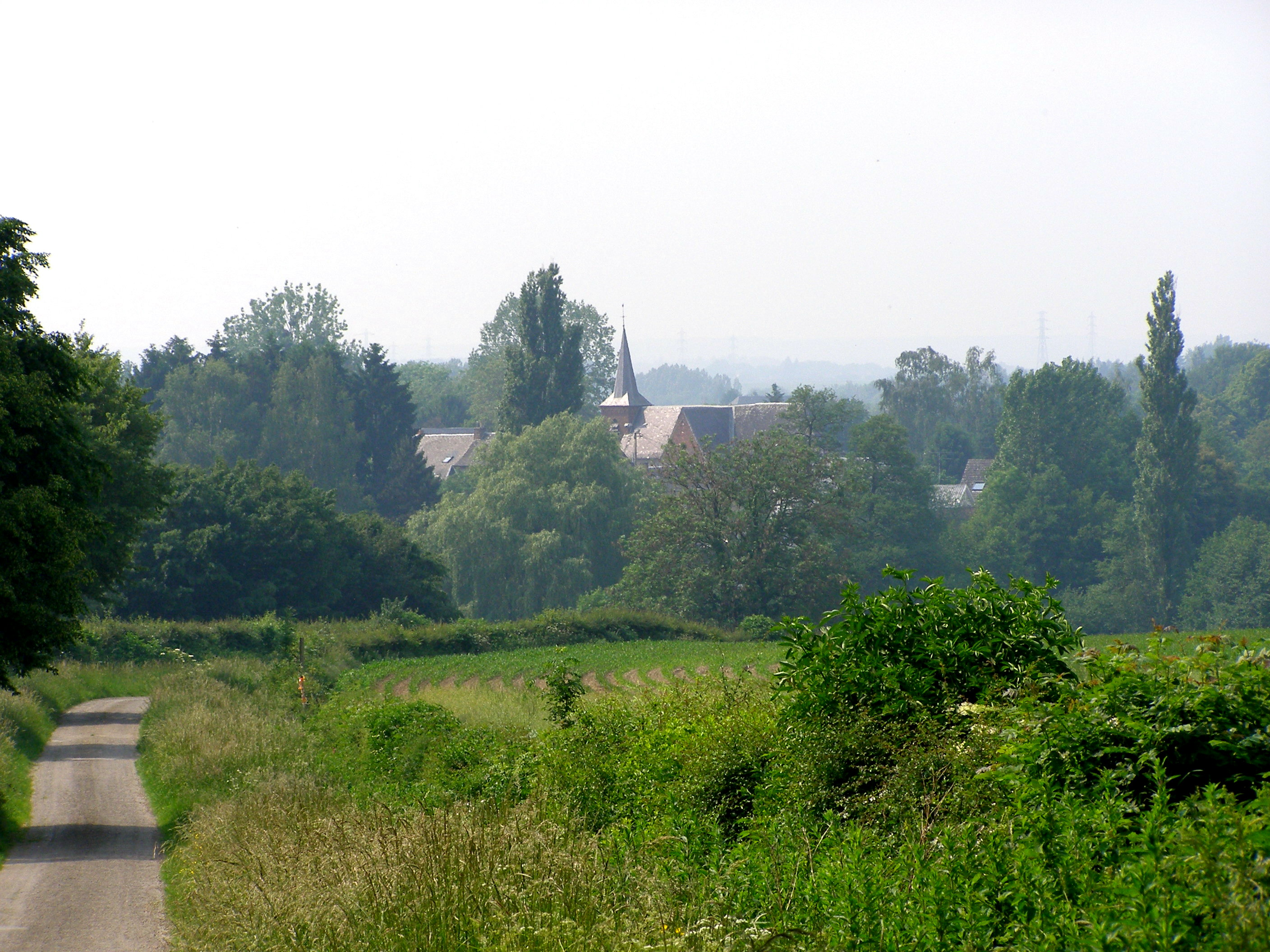
- Global view

- Coat of arms
- Location of Éclaibes
- Location within France Location within Hauts-de-France
- Coordinates: 50°12′15″N 3°55′57″E
- Country: France
- Region: Hauts-de-France
- Department: Nord
- Arrondissement: Avesnes-sur-Helpe
- Canton: Avesnes-sur-Helpe
- Intercommunality: CA Maubeuge Val de Sambre

Government
  - Mayor (2020–2026): Jacques Lamquet
- Area^{1}: 4.89 km^{2} (1.89 sq mi)
- Elevation: 175 m (574 ft)
- Highest elevation: 196 m (643 ft)
- Lowest elevation: 145 m (476 ft)
- Population (2023): 269
  - Density: 55.0/km^{2} (142/sq mi)
- Time zone: UTC+01:00 (CET)
  - Summer (DST): UTC+02:00 (CEST)
- INSEE/Postal code: 59187 /59330
- ^{1} French Land Register data, which excludes lakes, ponds, glaciers > 1 km^{2} (0.386 sq mi or 247 acres) and river estuaries.

Éclaibes (French pronunciation: [eklɛb]) is a commune in the Nord department in northern France.

== Heraldry ==
Arms of Éclaibes	The arms of Éclaibes are blazoned : Gules, 3 lions argent crowned Or. (Avesnes-les-Aubert, Éclaibes and Inchy use the same arms.)

== See also ==
- Communes of the Nord department
