= Gwen Le Gouil =

French freelance camera operator for Arte

- Born: Gwenlaouen Le Gouil; 1975? Lorient, France
- Education: Quimper University
- Occupations: Free lance cameraman and owner of Cargo Cult production company
- Organization: Arte
- Awards: Albert Londres Prize, Big International Reporting Festival Ilaria Alpi, Italy, Young Reporter Prize of the Festival d'Angers Scoop,

Gwenlaouen Le Gouil, also known as Gwen Le Gouil (c. 1975), is a French freelance camera operator for Arte in France. He is known for his award-winning video about the killing of humanitarian workers in Sri Lanka and for being kidnapped in Somalia while filming a documentary on human trafficking.

Le Gouil was awarded with the Albert Londres Prize in 2007 for Muttur: un crime contre l'humanitaire, a video about the killings of humanitarian workers in Sri Lanka.

== Personal life ==
Gwenlaouen Le Gouil, also referred to as Gwen Le Gouil, was born about 1975 in Lorient, France. Throughout his childhood, Le Gouil was raised in Bénodet, France. His parents, both former teachers, who continue to reside in Quimper, France. Le Gouil was educated at a college in Quimper. While in school, Le Gouil studied history and journalism, where he would soon begin his career in the communication field. Aside from journalism, Le Gouil is also an avid surfer.

== Career ==
=== General ===
Le Gouil first began his interest for reporting after the occurrence of many historical events that happened in the 1980s. After the collapse of the USSR and the fall of the Berlin Wall, Le Gouil’s passion for reporting was enhanced. He was offered various journalism opportunities to freelance in Asia, and Le Gouil chose to work in Bangkok, Thailand.

Le Gouil started his journalism career when he became a freelancer with Arte television, which is based in Strasbourg with an office in Paris, France. In 2007, Le Gouil was awarded the Albert Londres Award, along with Fabrice Launay and Anne Poiret, for their film called "Mutter, a crime against humanitarians," which was based in Sri Lanka, Asia.

In 2007, Gwen Le Gouil, along with his partner Jean-Laurent Bodinier, created Cargo Culte Productions. They create documentaries that focus on "the grey areas too often forgotten by the media." In December 2007, Le Gouil was kidnapped in Somalia while working on a documentary on human trafficking. He was held hostage for eight days, and was then released unharmed.

Today, Le Gouil, along with the rest of his production company, continues to manage Cargo Culte Productions and to create documentaries that reveal those "grey areas" of the world.

=== Kidnapping ===
After only 24 hours upon arrival to the town of Marrero in Somalia, Le Gouil was kidnapped by five men armed with AK-47s on December 16, 2007. The abductors were said to have told Le Gouil’s translator and driver to leave the scene immediately. Le Gouil was then moved from the Bosaso region to a mountainous area east of the country, where he had no access to clean water or medicine. In order to release Le Gouil, the kidnappers supposedly wanted $70,000 from the government. Various elders of the region and many government officials were negotiating this trade-off in order to set Le Gouil free. Eight days later, on December 24, Le Gouil was finally released to two elders, who were from the same clan as the kidnappers. Supposedly no money was taken in exchange for Le Gouil’s freedom. When set free, he was reported to be in good health with no major injuries. Soon after his release, the elders took Le Gouil to the Puntland ministers who would return Le Gouil to French diplomats in a hotel in Bosaso.

When released from captivity, Le Gouil was criticized by Puntland’s president for not informing the government of his plan to work in the area of Bosaso on a documentary film. During an interview two years after his kidnapping, Le Gouil stated how he thinks about the people he met in Somalia on regular basis, but he is unable to return into the country because, should something happen to him, he would lose all credibility. He hopes to one day revisit the country and do more journalistic work.

== Awards ==
In 2007, Le Gouil was awarded the Albert Londres Prize due to his documentary in Sri Lanka. In 2008, Le Gouil received the "Best Report Award" at a Festival in Italy for his documentary "Somalia: leave or die." Le Gouil was also awarded the "Best Investigation" award for his broadcast on Arte for "Poor Whites" at the Scoop Festival in Angers, France. Also at this event, he received the "Young Reporter Award".
