= Émile Condroyer =

French journalist and writer

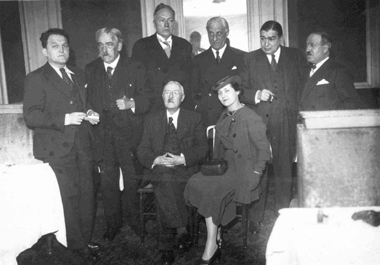
The first jury of the Albert Londres Prize: Émile Condroyer, Charles Pettit, Ludovic Naudeau, Jacques de Marsillac, Louis Ronfaud, Maral Bureau, Pierre Mille, Florise Londres.

Émile Condroyer (b. 1897, d. 1950 in Villejuif) was a French journalist and writer. He authored numerous works focusing on the sea and the lives of fishermen. In 1933, he was awarded the Albert Londres Prize for the “ensemble de ses reportages”, specifically for La Maison du grand silence. He also served as a founding member and treasurer for the prize's initial jury. As a journalist, he wrote notably for Le Petit Parisien.

== Works (in selection) ==
- La maison du grand silence. Nouvelle Revue Critique, coll. La vie d'aujourd'hui, Paris 1928
- Les hommes dans la tempête. Éditions de la Nouvelle Revue Critique. Paris 1930 (in partial view, éditions L'Ancre de Marine 1993)
- Dans les houles d'Islande. Collection La vie d'aujourd'hui, La Nouvelle Revue Critique, Paris 1929
- Des fjords aux tulipes. Collection Toute la terre. Éditions Baudinière, Paris 1929. (digitized copy)
- L'ermite de l'Atlantique. Collection La vie d'aujourd'hui - La Nouvelle Revue Critique, Paris 1931
- (with Jean Prévost) La France travaille - Mariniers et bateliers - Gens de mer. Jean Prévost and Emile Condroyer (texts), François Kollar (photographs). Éditions des Horizons de France. Paris 1932
- Malgorn le baleinier. Les Éditions de la Nouvelle France, Paris 1946
- Une campagne de pêche au large de l'Islande. Edité par La Découvrance. La Rochelle 2007

== See also ==
- Jean Mabire
