= Jean-Gérard Fleury =

- Born: 24 November 1905; Inchy
- Died: 2 June 2002 (aged 96); Rio de Janeiro
- Occupations: Journalist; Writer; Poet

Jean-Gérard Fleury (24 November 1905 – 2 June 2002) was a French businessman, aviator, journalist and writer.

== Biography ==
Coming from a northern farming family from France, Fleury graduated from the Institut d’Études Politiques and became a lawyer and journalist in Paris. In 1931, he made a report on the airline Toulouse-Santiago du Chili. Passionate about aviation and the Compagnie générale aéropostale, he met pilots like Antoine de Saint-Exupéry, Marcel Reine, Henri Guillaumet and Jean Mermoz. The latter will help him pass his pilot's license. He entered as head of the aeronautics section at Paris-Soir of which he will be a permanent correspondent in Brazil. Fleury began a career as a company director and worked, between 1945 and 1978, for various companies, Société Louis Bréguet and Sud-Aviation as correspondent for the daily France-Soir. He died 2 June 2002 in Rio de Janeiro. In 1938 he was awarded the Albert Londres Prize

== Works ==
- 1933: Chemins du Ciel, preface by Joseph Kessel, Lettre de Jean Mermoz, Sorlot éditeur
- 1938: Un Homme Libre chez les Soviets, Les Éditions de France
- 1939; La Ligne (de Mermoz, Guillaumet, Saint-Exupéry et de leurs compagnons), Gallimard
- 1940: Getulio Vargas, président des États-Unis du Brésil, Plon, Paris
- 1943: Sud Amérique, Éditions de la Maison Française, New York
