= Victor Franco =

French journalist (1930–2018)

Victor Franco (1930 in Baghdad – 18 February 2018) was a French journalist who was awarded the 1963 Albert Londres Prize for La Révolution sensuelle. He died in Montélimar on 18 February 2018 at the age of 87.
