= Alexandre Dereims =

- Awards: Albert Londres Prize

Alexandre Dereims is a French journalist and documentary films maker. His documentaries have been broadcast by Arte, France Télévisions, Canal+, Planète+, and international broadcasters including SVT, TSR, TVE, YLE, RTV, ABC, KBS, and RTF.

== Career ==
In 2007, Dereims received the International Red Cross Prize at the Monte-Carlo Television Festival for Un génocide à huis clos, a documentary about the persecution and plight of the Karen people in Burma (now Myanmar).

In 2009, he won the Albert Londres Prize, one of France's major journalism awards, for his documentary Han, le prix de la liberté. The same year, he was awarded the Golden Nymph for Best Documentary at the Monte-Carlo Television Festival for La Corée du Nord: la liberté ou la mort. Both documentaries were filmed secretly and followed North Korean defectors as they attempted to reach South Korea through China and Southeast Asia.

In 2010 and 2011, Dereims documented the journeys of African migrants attempting to reach Europe. He filmed their passage through the Ténéré Desert and later followed migrants during the political upheavals of the Arab Spring in Egypt and Libya. His documentary Le Piège was selected for the Al Jazeera Documentary Film Festival and the International Documentary Film Festival Amsterdam (IDFA).

From 2012, Dereims worked with producer and press photographer Claire Beilvert on a feature-length documentary about the Jarawa people of the Andaman Islands in India. The project sought to document the community's way of life and, in particular, to allow members of the Jarawa to speak for themselves. Dereims and Beilvert were among the first journalists to interview members of the community. The resulting film, Nous sommes l'humanité, premiered at the Musée Guimet in Paris on 12 April 2018.

== Documentaries ==
=== Han, le prix de la liberté ===
Han, le prix de la liberté (Han, the Price of Freedom) follows North Korean defectors attempting to escape one of the world's most isolated and repressive states and reach South Korea.

Directly crossing the border between North and South Korea is virtually impossible because of the heavily fortified Korean Demilitarized Zone (DMZ), which extends for approximately 248 kilometres and is about four kilometres wide. As a result, many escapees attempt to travel through northern China and Southeast Asia before reaching South Korea.

The journey may span thousands of kilometres and expose those attempting to leave North Korea to arrest, detention, and forced repatriation. Upon repatriation, North Korean defectors may face severe punishment. The documentary was filmed over the course of one year in South Korea, China, and Thailand, and follows the experiences of North Korean refugees during and after their escape.

The film also examines the challenges faced by North Korean defectors after their arrival in South Korea. Despite having left North Korea, some experience difficulties adjusting to South Korean society, including social isolation and a sense of displacement. The film also addresses the psychological and emotional impact of separation from family members and the lives they left behind.

=== Le Piège ===
Le Piège (Another Life) examines African migration toward Europe and the policies developed by European countries to restrict irregular migration.

The documentary was filmed over two years in Niger, Libya, Tunisia, Egypt, Greece, Italy, and France. It follows African migrants as they cross the Sahara, particularly the Ténéré Desert, in the hope of reaching Libya and eventually Europe. The film portrays migrants fleeing poverty, armed conflict, and political repression, and documents the dangers encountered along the route.

=== Nous sommes l'humanité ===
Nous sommes l'humanité (We Are Humanity) is a feature-length documentary about the Jarawa, an Indigenous people living in the Andaman Islands of India. Dereims and Claire Beilvert began working on the project in 2012. The filmmakers sought to give members of the Jarawa an opportunity to describe their own lives, culture, and relationship with their environment.

The film premiered at the Musée Guimet in Paris on 12 April 2018.
