= Taha Siddiqui =

Pakistani journalist based in Paris

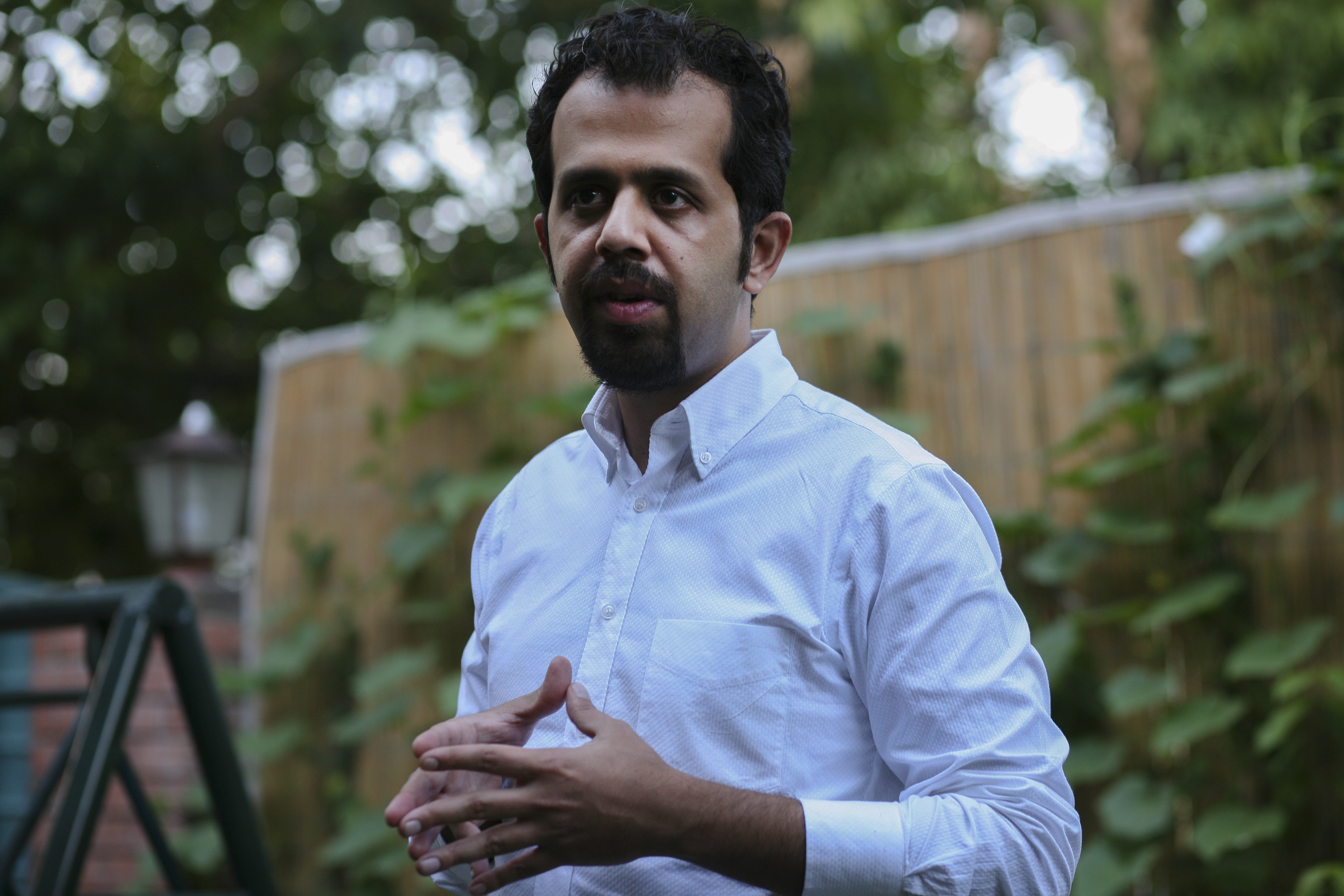
- Education: Institute of Business Administration, Karachi
- Occupation: Journalist
- Awards: Albert Londres Prize (2014)

Taha Siddiqui is a Pakistani-born journalist based in Paris. He is an active critic of the military of Pakistan.

== Early life and career ==
He is a graduate of Institute of Business Administration, Karachi. Calling himself an "accidental journalist", he entered the news industry as a financial analyst for CNBC. After joining Geo TV as a business reporter, he took on more mainstream assignments, becoming a reporter at Express TV and a producer for Dunya TV before joining France 24 in 2012. Two years later, he won the Albert Londres Prize, alongside Julien Fouchet and Sylvain Lepetit, for The Polio War, a documentary on the challenges facing polio eradication efforts in Pakistan.

He is also founder of the SAFE Newsrooms.

In January 2018, in Islamabad, gunmen tried to abduct Siddiqui, but he managed to escape.

Afterwards, he and his family moved to Paris, where they live in exile. In a Washington Post opinion article, Siddiqui stated that a US intelligence agency informed him of plans by the Pakistani military to assassinate him if he ever returned. In 2020, he opened "The Dissident Club", a bar for exiles and dissidents serving as a refuge and a discussion space. He co-authored an autobiographic bande dessinée graphic novel of the same name that was released in 2023.

== Awards ==
- Albert Londres Prize (2014)
