= Luc Mathieu =

French journalist

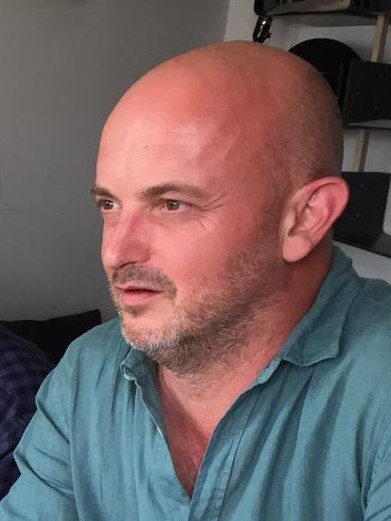
Portrait de Luc Mathieu

Luc Mathieu (born 1974) is a French journalist. He has been working as a reporter for Libération since 2011.

In 2015, Matthieu was awarded the Albert Londres Prize for his series of articles on the jihad he made in Syria, Kurdistan and Iraq.
