= Pierre Voisin =

French journalist (1910–1987)

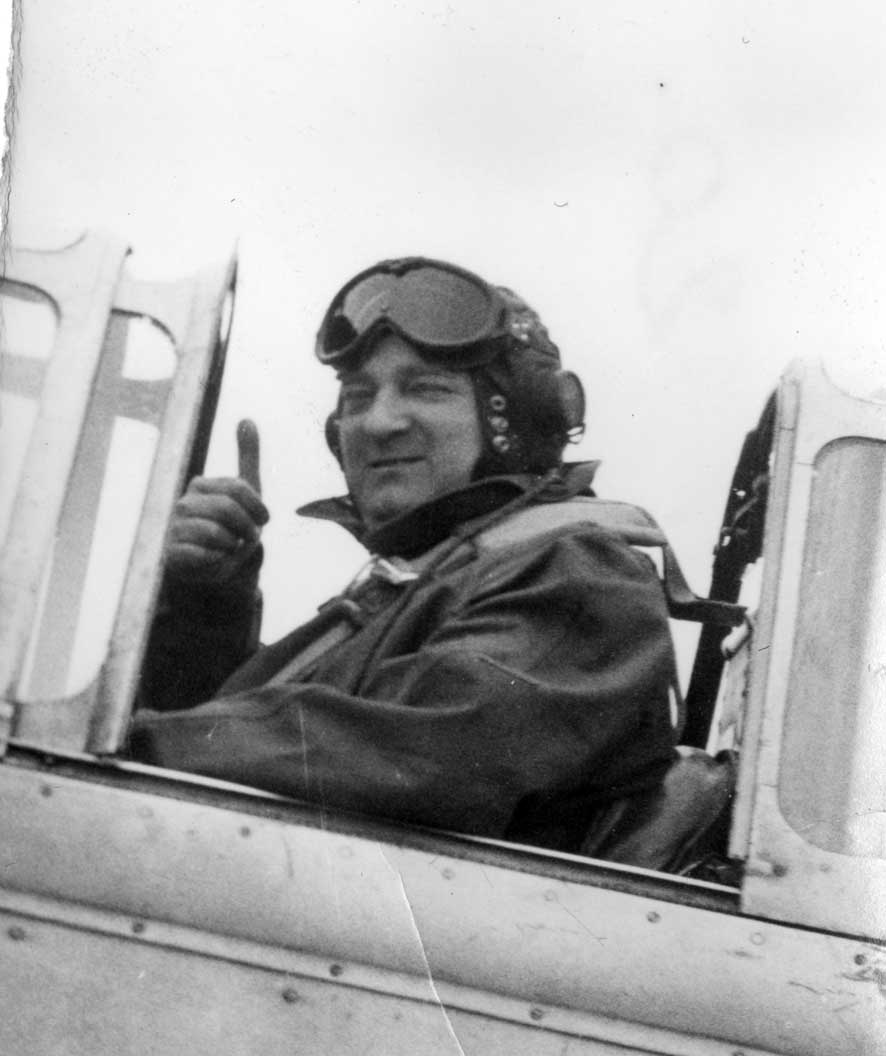
Pierre Voisin

Pierre Voisin (1910–1987) was a senior French reporter.

As a reporter for Paris-Midi from 1933, he took part to the Second World War, first in the 2nd Armored Division, then in Senegal, Morocco and Corsica. He participated to Operation Dragoon in August 1944, then left as a volunteer in French Indochina in October 1945.

In 1947 he returned to civilian life and made reports for Le Monde and Le Figaro (Madagascar, French West Africa).

In 1951, he specialized in aviation (private plane pilot and helicopter) until his retirement in 1973.

His reports have taken him throughout the world: Israel, Algeria, the United States, Argentina, Malaysia, Venezuela, Caribbeans, etc.

In 1941, he published Ceux des chars and in 1948 was awarded the Albert Londres Prize for a series of articles on Haute-Volta.
