= Bernard Molitor =

Bernard Molitor (22 October 1755 – 17 November 1833) was a Luxembourgish cabinet-maker.

Molitor grew up in Betzdorf, Luxembourg as the son of a miller and went to Paris in 1777, where one of his cousins already worked as a cabinet-maker. During his first years in Paris, he made a living as a merchant: in 1778, he advertised insecticides, and six years later he sold handwarmers shaped like books.

After marrying the daughter of a charpentier du roi (carpenter of the king) in 1787, he became maître ébéniste (master cabinet-maker) and member of the guild of cabinet-makers. He opened a workshop in the Rue de Bourbon (today Rue de Lille). One of his first orders came from Marie Antoinette, who ordered the floor paneling from mahogany wood for her boudoir in the Palace of Fontainebleau from him. Just as Molitor had begun making a name for himself among the French nobility, the French Revolution broke out, and Molitor had to close his business as most of his clients had to flee or were killed. Later, Molitor was able to reopen his business and employ several artisans who helped him create a variety of furniture, including dressers, tables, desks and cupboards. Molitor's furniture was often veneered with precious woods and decorated with applications of gilded bronze. Napoleon Bonaparte ordered several pieces of furniture for his Château de Saint-Cloud residence from him. In 1811, Molitor became fournisseur de la Cour impériale (purveyor to the imperial court).

In 1800, Bernard Molitor bought a house on the elegant Rue du Faubourg Saint-Honoré. In 1815, he married a second time, and in 1820 he moved to Fontainebleau where he died in 1833 at the age of 78 years. He is buried in the Fontainebleau cemetery.

In 1995, while Luxembourg was the European Capital of Culture, a retrospective brought broad public attention to Molitor's work for the first time. Today, collectors pay large sums for original Molitor furniture. Three pieces by Molitor are in the Royal Collection of the British royal family.

== Sources ==
- Leben, Ulrich (1989). Bernard Molitor (1755-1833): Leben und Werk eines Pariser Kunsttischlers. Rheinische Friedrich Wilhelm Universität Bonn.
- Leben, Ulrich (1992). Molitor, ébéniste de Louis XVI à Louis XVIII. St.-Rémy-l'Eau.
- Gordon Campbell, ed. (2006). "Molitor, Bernard". The Grove Encyclopedia of Decorative Arts. Vol. 2. Oxford University Press. p. 118. ISBN 9780195189483.
