= Luc Le Vaillant =

French journalist

Luc Le Vaillant (born 1958, Landivisiau) is a French journalist. Since 2000, he runs the "Portrait" section of the daily Libération.

== Biography ==
The son of a general practitioner and a mother professor of Italian and French, he is the eldest of a family of six children. He spent his childhood at Plougasnou where he became passionate about sailing, leading him to frequent the French Olympic team.

After studying philosophy at Brest and the Sorbonne, he graduated from the Centre de formation des journalistes of Paris in 1984, and began his career in sailing magazines. He was director of the French Committee for the America's Cup presided by Jean Glavany and then joined the cabinet of Louis Le Pensec, Minister of the DOM-TOM, to write his speeches.

In 1990, Luc Le Vaillant joined the sports department of Libération and in 1995 the "Portrait" section of which he became responsible five years later. Since January 2013, he has been holding a column entitled "Ré / jouissances" every Tuesday.

In 1998, he received the Albert Londres Prize in the press category.

== Prizes and awards ==
- 1997: Prix Mumm
- 1998: Prix Albert-Londres

== Bibliography ==
- 2014: Luc Le Vaillant. La vie rêvée des filles. Fayard. p. 368. ISBN 2213680914.
