= Thierry Desjardins =

French reporter and pamphleteer

Thierry Desjardins (born 1 October 1941) is a French reporter and pamphleteer, who works as a journalist for Le Figaro.

== Career ==
Thierry Desjardins was born 1 October 1941 in the 8th arrondissement of Paris.

Desjardin entered the political service of Le Figaro in 1963, moved to the foreign service in 1966 and became a senior reporter from 1973 to 1981. After a short passage as editor of France-Soir from 1981 to 1983, he returned to Le Figaro as a senior reporter and became deputy editor from 1990 to 1993, and then general deputy director from 1993 to 2000.

== Distinctions ==
- 1975: Albert Londres Prize
- 2000: Prix Louis-Pauwels
- Officier de la Légion d’Honneur
- Officier de l’Ordre national du Mérite.

== Bibliography ==
- 1974: Cent millions d’Arabes, Elsevier
- 1976: Le Martyre du Liban, Plon
- 1977: La Corse à la dérive, Plon
- 1981: Sadate, pharaon d'Égypte, Éditions Marcel Valtat, ISBN 2-86315-015-4
- 1983: Un inconnu nommé Chirac, La Table ronde
- 1986: Les chiraquiens, La Table ronde
- 1994: Pasqua, Édition n° 1
- 1996: Lettre au Président à propos de l'immigration, et de quelques autres sujets tabous qu'il faudra bien finir par aborder, Fixot
- 1998: Lettre au président sur les malheurs de la France, Robert Laffont
- 1998: Le Cancre, Robert Laffont, Prix Louis Barthou of the Académie française
- 1999 Le scandale de l'éducation nationale, Robert Laffont, ISBN 2-221-09059-4
- 2000: Arrêtez d'emmerder les Français, Plon, ISBN 225919026X
- 2001: Chirac, réveille-toi, Robert Laffont
- 2004: Monsieur le président, c'est une révolution qu'il faut faire !, Albin Michel
- 2006: Nicolas, Laurent, Ségolène, Dominique… Assez ! de mensonges, d'hypocrisie, de promesses, de parlotes, de trahisons, de lâcheté…, JC Lattès, ISBN 2709627957
- 2008: Galipettes et cabrioles à l'Élysée, Fayard, ISBN 978-2-213-63737-2
- 2009: Sarkozy, ses balivernes et ses fanfaronnades, Fayard
