= René Puissesseau =

French journalist (1919–1970)

René Puissesseau (25 September 1919 – 7 July 1970, Siem Reap) was a French journalist and chief reporter working for the ORTF.

For a long time he headed the political service of France-Soir

In 1957, he received the Albert Londres Prize for his reportages compiled under the title Quelqu'un mourra ce soir aux Caraïbes, Éditions Gallimard.

He later participated in the famous television magazine Cinq colonnes à la une.

He died age 50 in Cambodia in the exercise of his duties, as did Raymond Meyer (26 years), cameraman. Alain Clément, the soundman, was the only member of the trio not to be victim of the bullets fired at their exit of the Angkor Vat temple.
