= Olingen =

Town in Luxembourg

Coordinates: 49°41′N 6°19′E

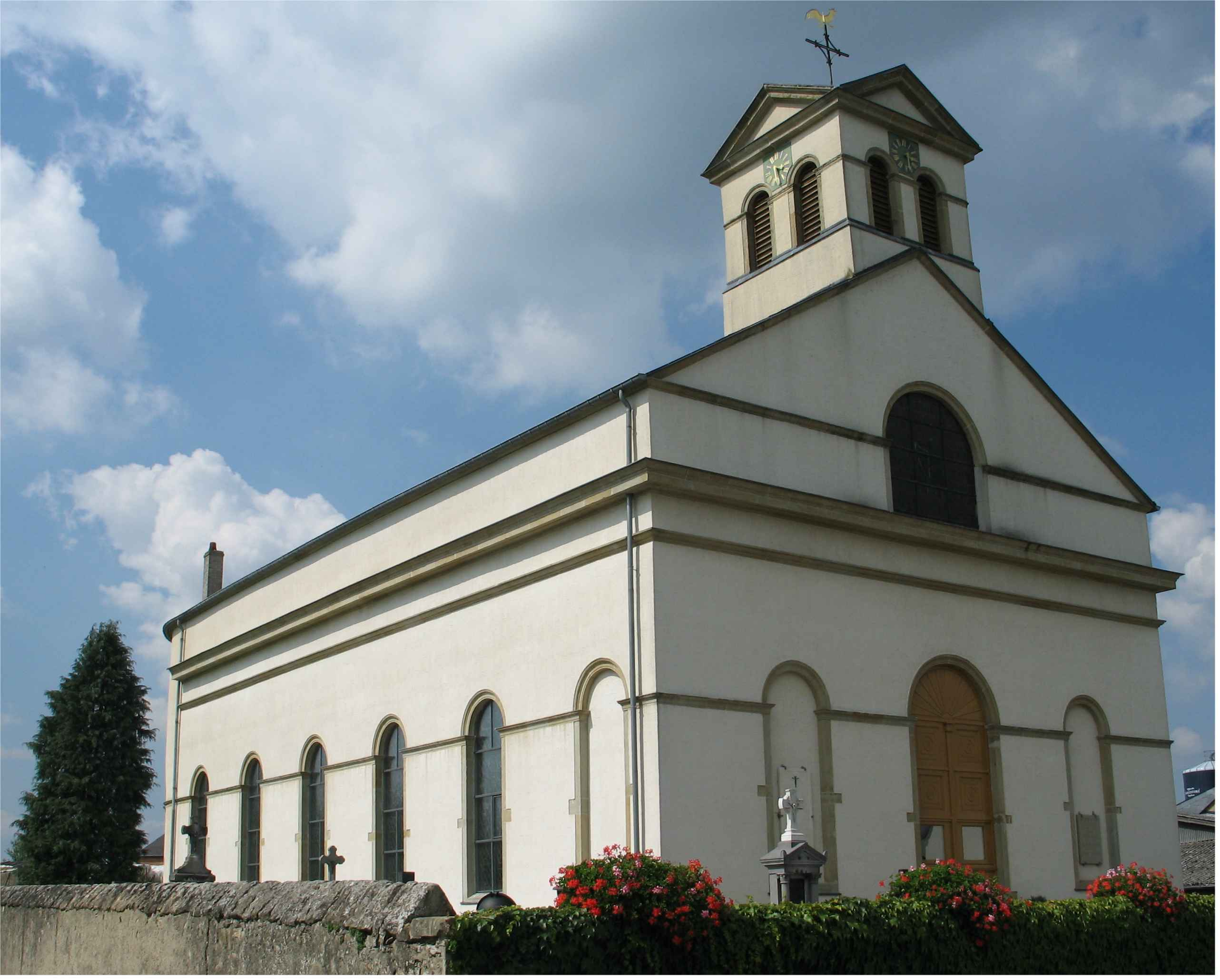
Catholic Church of Olingen, of the Parish of Musel and Syr Saint-Jacques

Olingen (German pronunciation: [ˈoːlɪŋən]; Luxembourgish: Ouljen) is a small town in the commune of Betzdorf, in eastern Luxembourg. As of September 2026, the town has a population of 482.
