= Max Clos =

French journalist

- Born: 6 January 1924; Ludwigshafen, France
- Died: 9 March 2002 (aged 78); Paris, France
- Education: Lycée Chaptal; Faculty of Law of Paris; Sciences Po
- Occupation: Journalist
- Employer: Le Figaro

Max Clos (6 January 1924, Ludwigshafen – 9 March 2002) was a 20th-century French journalist and the former editor-in-chief of Le Figaro from 1975 to 1988.

== Prizes ==
- 1962: Prix Albert-Londres

== Bibliography ==
- 1969: L'Année du singe
- 1970: La Revanche des deux vaincus : Allemagne-Japon (with Yves Cuau)

== Honors and awards ==
- Knight of the Ordre National du Mérite
- Knight of the Order of Legion of Honour
