= Patrick de Saint-Exupéry =

French journalist

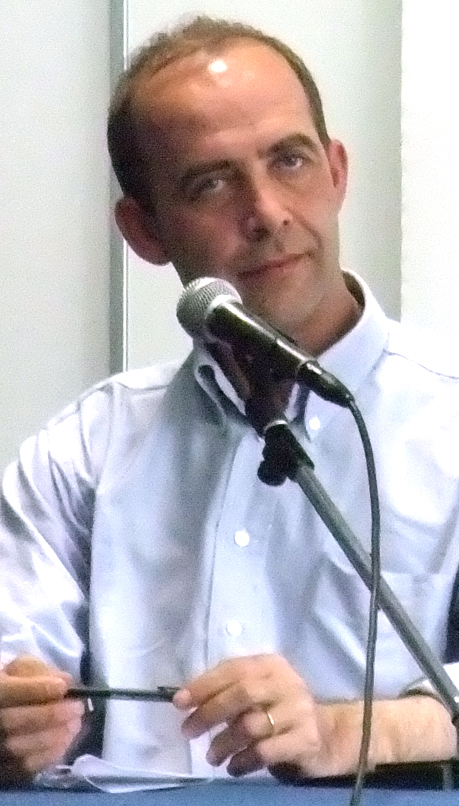
Patrick de Saint-Exupéry in May 2008

Patrick de Saint-Exupéry (born 16 September 1962) is the son of Count Jacques de Saint-Exupéry and the Countess de Saint-Exupéry, born as Martine d'Anglejan. Antoine de Saint-Exupéry, the aviator and writer, was the cousin of his grandfather. Patrick started his career in journalism at age 19 after winning a young reporters award.

He has worked for several newspapers :

- France Soir Magazine starting in 1983;
- France Soir at the foreign service in 1987;
- Freelancer for L'Express and Grands Reportages in 1988;
- Le Figaro, foreign service desk, starting in 1989.

During the course of his career he has covered events in Africa, Cambodia, Canada, Liberia, South Africa, the Gulf War, Iran, Libya, Saudi Arabia and Rwanda, and finally Moscow, where he was a permanent correspondent from 2000 to 2004. In 2005 he resumed working in Africa again as a journalist for Le Figaro.

He won the Albert Londres Award in 1991 for his series of reports on the Liberian civil war and on the end of apartheid. Patrick de Saint-Exupéry is also a member of the Albert Londres Award's jury.

In 2004 Saint-Exupéry wrote a book entirely devoted to the role of France in Rwanda, entitled L'Inavouable (Unspeakable), in which he led Dominique de Villepin to the scene of his reports during Operation Turquoise. Two days after the publication of his book, he spoke at a conference at the French National Assembly on the French involvement in Rwanda. This book was revised in a new edition in April 2009 on the occasion of the fifteenth anniversary of the beginning of the Rwandan genocide. Titled Complices de l'inavouable: la France au Rwanda (Accomplices of the unspeakable: France in Rwanda), it is published by Les arènes.

In January 2008, Saint-Exupéry took a leave from Figaro to launch, with Laurent Beccaria, the newsmagazine XXI where he is editor-in-chief.

In 2014, at the same editions, Patrick de Saint-Exupéry published the album BD The fantasy of the gods, with Hippolyte, evoking the drama of Rwanda in 1994. For the magazine Télérama, in May 2014: "The authors relate finely and modestly 'Horror, giving it all the more force». At the end of December 2014, for the same Télérama magazine, the album is one of the "10 best comics of the year 2014". In March 2021, Patrick de Saint-Exupéry published a new book called the crossing, in which he broke the breach Theory of a "second genocide" after that of the Tutsi in Rwanda.
