= Julie Brafman =

French journalist

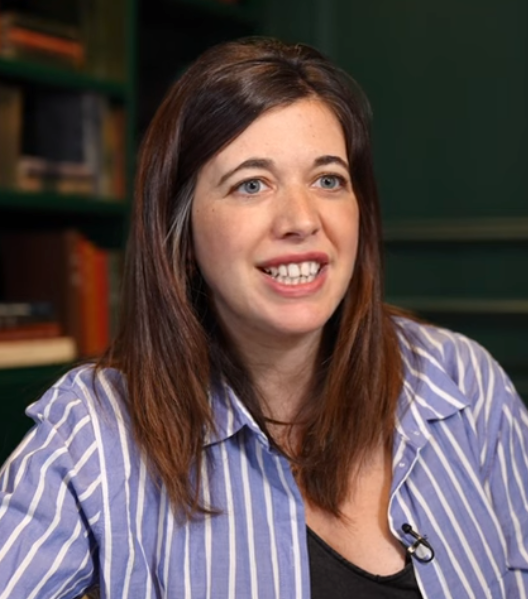
- In a 2025 interview
- Born: 1986 (age 39–40)
- Education: Sciences Po; Paris-Panthéon-Assas University (IFP)
- Occupations: Journalist; Author
- Employer: Libération
- Known for: Judicial column and coverage of high-profile trials
- Awards: Albert Londres Prize (2025)

Julie Brafman (born 1986) is a French journalist and author known for her work as a senior judicial columnist for the daily newspaper Libération. In 2025, she achieved significant professional recognition as the recipient of the Albert Londres Prize, the highest honor in French-language journalism.

Brafman is a graduate of the Sciences Po and the French Press Institute (IFP) at the Paris-Panthéon-Assas University.

== Career ==
In 2016, she joined the staff of Libération as a judicial reporter.

=== Albert Londres Prize ===
In October 2025, during a ceremony held in Beirut, Brafman was awarded the 87th Albert Londres Prize for the written press. The jury highlighted her "intelligent empathy" in her coverage of several prominent legal cases, including the Kim Kardashian robbery in Paris and the trial of the surgeon Joël Le Scouarnec.

== Bibliography ==
- Vertiges de l'aveu (2016), an essay on the role of confessions in the judicial system.ISBN 9782234079427, 978-2234079427
- Yann dans la nuit (2025), a biographical novel on Yann Andréa.ISBN 208049029X, 978-2080490292
