= Inchy =

- Commune
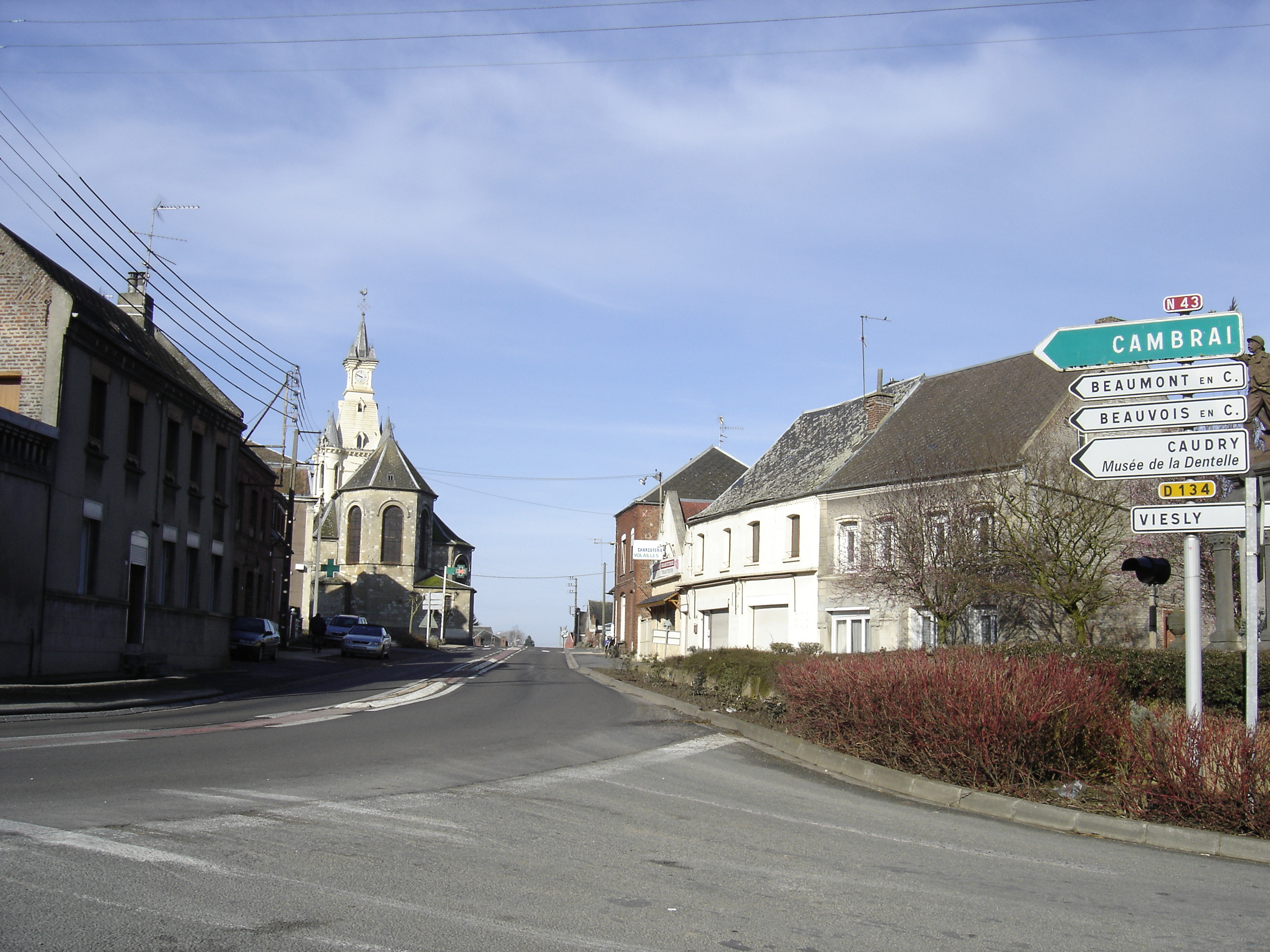
- A view within Inchy

- Coat of arms
- Location of Inchy
- Location within France Location within Hauts-de-France
- Coordinates: 50°07′25″N 3°27′49″E
- Country: France
- Region: Hauts-de-France
- Department: Nord
- Arrondissement: Cambrai
- Canton: Le Cateau-Cambrésis
- Intercommunality: CA Caudrésis–Catésis

Government
  - Mayor (2020–2026): Étienne Basquin
- Area^{1}: 3.90 km^{2} (1.51 sq mi)
- Highest elevation: 139 m (456 ft)
- Lowest elevation: 104 m (341 ft)
- Population (2023): 619
  - Density: 159/km^{2} (411/sq mi)
- Time zone: UTC+01:00 (CET)
  - Summer (DST): UTC+02:00 (CEST)
- INSEE/Postal code: 59321 /59540
- ^{1} French Land Register data, which excludes lakes, ponds, glaciers > 1 km^{2} (0.386 sq mi or 247 acres) and river estuaries.

Inchy (French pronunciation: [ɛ̃ʃi]) is a commune in the Nord department in northern France. Jean-Gérard Fleury (1905–2002), French businessman, aviator, journalist and writer, was born in Inchy.

== Heraldry ==
Arms of Inchy	The arms of Inchy are blazoned : Gules, 3 lions argent crowned Or. (Avesnes-les-Aubert, Éclaibes and Inchy use the same arms.)

== See also ==
- Communes of the Nord department
