= Hélène Lam Trong =

French movie director and screenwriter

- Hélène Lam Trong in 2025
- Born: 1982 (age 43–44)
- Education: Institute of Political Studies, Toulouse; CELSA Paris
- Occupation: Documentary filmmaker
- Years active: 2014–present
- Notable work: Daech, les enfants fantômes
- Children: 2
- Awards: Albert Londres Prize of audiovisual 2023

Hélène Lam Trong (born 1982) is a French documentary filmmaker. Her 2023 documentary Daech, les enfants fantômes (ISIS, the Ghost Children) earned her the Albert Londres Prize for an audio-visual work.

== Life and career ==
Lam Trong was born in 1982 to a French mother and a Vietnamese father. She has two children.

She earned her degree from the Institute of Political Studies in Toulouse in 2004 and later graduated from the School of Advanced Studies in Information and Communication Sciences at the CELSA Paris in 2006. In 2014, she helmed the documentary L’absente, maman est en prison (The Absent One, Mom is in Prison). In 2017, she took a stand against anti-Asian racism by creating the "Asiatique de France" music video alongside Frédéric Chau, Anggun, and other prominent French Asian personalities, generating considerable media attention.

Between 2018 and 2020, Lam Trong directed four documentaries aired on France 2: Josephine H., Lilian Dubus et L'Enfant roux (The Red-Haired Child), and Daech: les enfants du soupçons (ISIS: Children of Suspicion). In the documentary Réseaux de la colère (Networks of Anger), she provided a voice for Thaïs d'Escufon and Joachim Son-Forget. In 2023, she directed the documentary Daech, les enfants fantômes (ISIS, the Ghost Children), produced by Fabienne Servan-Schreiber, earning a special mention from the Jury at the Justice Documentary Festival Paris and the Albert Londres Prize for an audio-visual work. In 2024, she directed Raqqa, l'ombre de Daech (Raqqa, Shadow of ISIS).

Her 2025 documentary, Inside Gaza, won Best Global Issues Pitch at the 2024 Sunny Side of the Doc event. It follows a group of AFP journalists based in Gaza during the Gaza war in 2023 and 2024.

== Filmography ==
=== Director ===
- 2025: Inside Gaza (Between the Lines)
- 2024: Raqqa, l'ombre de Daech (Raqqa, Shadow of ISIS)
- 2023: Daech, les enfants fantômes (ISIS, Ghost Children)
- 2020: Daech, les enfants du soupçon (ISIS, Children of Suspicion)
- 2020: L’enfant roux (The Red-Haired Child)
- 2020: Lilian Dubus
- 2018: Josephine H.
- 2014: L’Absente, Maman est en prison (The Absent, Mom is in prison)

== Distinctions ==
=== Awards ===
- 2023: Special Mention of Jury at Justice Documentary Festival Paris
- 2023: Albert Londres Prize of audiovisual
- 2006: Rotary Prize for young reporters for the document Bui Doi, Dust of Life, about African American soldiers and Vietnamese women during the Vietnam war
