= François Missen =

French journalist (born 1933)

François Missen (born 1933 in Oran) is a French journalist, winner of the 1974 Albert Londres Prize.

== Bibliography ==
- 1983: La Nuit afghane, Éditions Le Pré aux clercs, ISBN 978-2714415813
- 1999: Cuba, Nathan Nature, ISBN 978-2092609392
- 2002: Martinique, Nathan Nature, ISBN 978-2092610367
- 2004: Le Réseau Carlyle : Banquier des guerres américaines, Flammarion, ISBN 978-2080686657
- 2004: Potomac, cowritten with Jean-Pierre Bastid, JC Lattès, ISBN 978-2709624541
