= Avesnes-les-Aubert =

- Commune
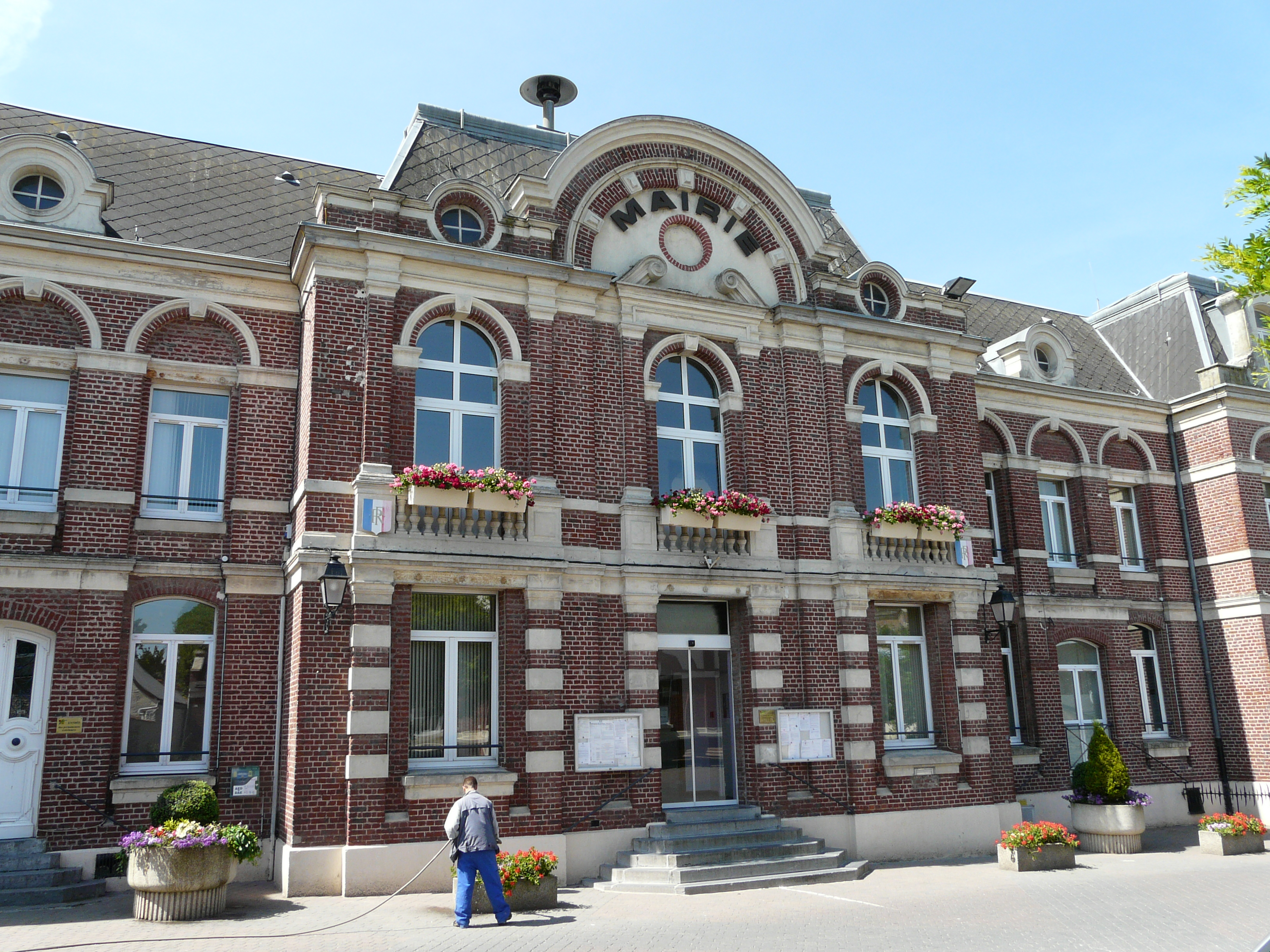
- Town hall

- Coat of arms
- Location of Avesnes-les-Aubert
- Location within France Location within Hauts-de-France
- Coordinates: 50°11′52″N 3°22′51″E
- Country: France
- Region: Hauts-de-France
- Department: Nord
- Arrondissement: Cambrai
- Canton: Caudry
- Intercommunality: CA Caudrésis–Catésis

Government
  - Mayor (2025–2026): Laurent Maillard
- Area^{1}: 9.01 km^{2} (3.48 sq mi)
- Elevation: 41 m (135 ft)
- Highest elevation: 96 m (315 ft)
- Lowest elevation: 53 m (174 ft)
- Population (2023): 3,562
  - Density: 395/km^{2} (1,020/sq mi)
- Time zone: UTC+01:00 (CET)
  - Summer (DST): UTC+02:00 (CEST)
- INSEE/Postal code: 59037 /59129
- ^{1} French Land Register data, which excludes lakes, ponds, glaciers > 1 km^{2} (0.386 sq mi or 247 acres) and river estuaries.

Avesnes-les-Aubert (French pronunciation: [avɛn le.z‿obɛʁ]) is a commune in the Nord department in northern France.

== Population ==
Historical population

Year	Pop.	±% p.a.
1793	2,047	—
1821	2,444	+0.64%
1846	2,893	+0.68%
1872	3,682	+0.93%
1901	4,905	+0.99%
1926	4,631	−0.23%
1946	4,165	−0.53%
1962	4,426	+0.38%
1968	4,355	−0.27%

Year	Pop.	±% p.a.
1975	4,256	−0.33%
1982	4,031	−0.77%
1990	3,848	−0.58%
1999	3,592	−0.76%
2007	3,720	+0.44%
2012	3,598	−0.66%
2017	3,640	+0.23%
2023	3,562	−0.36%

Source: EHESS and INSEE (1968-2023)

== Heraldry ==
Arms of Avesnes-les-Aubert	The arms of Avesnes-les-Aubert are blazoned : Gules, 3 lions argent crowned Or. (Avesnes-les-Aubert, Éclaibes and Inchy use the same arms.)

== See also ==
- Communes of the Nord department
