= Berg, Luxembourg =

Coordinates: 49.814°N 6.089°E

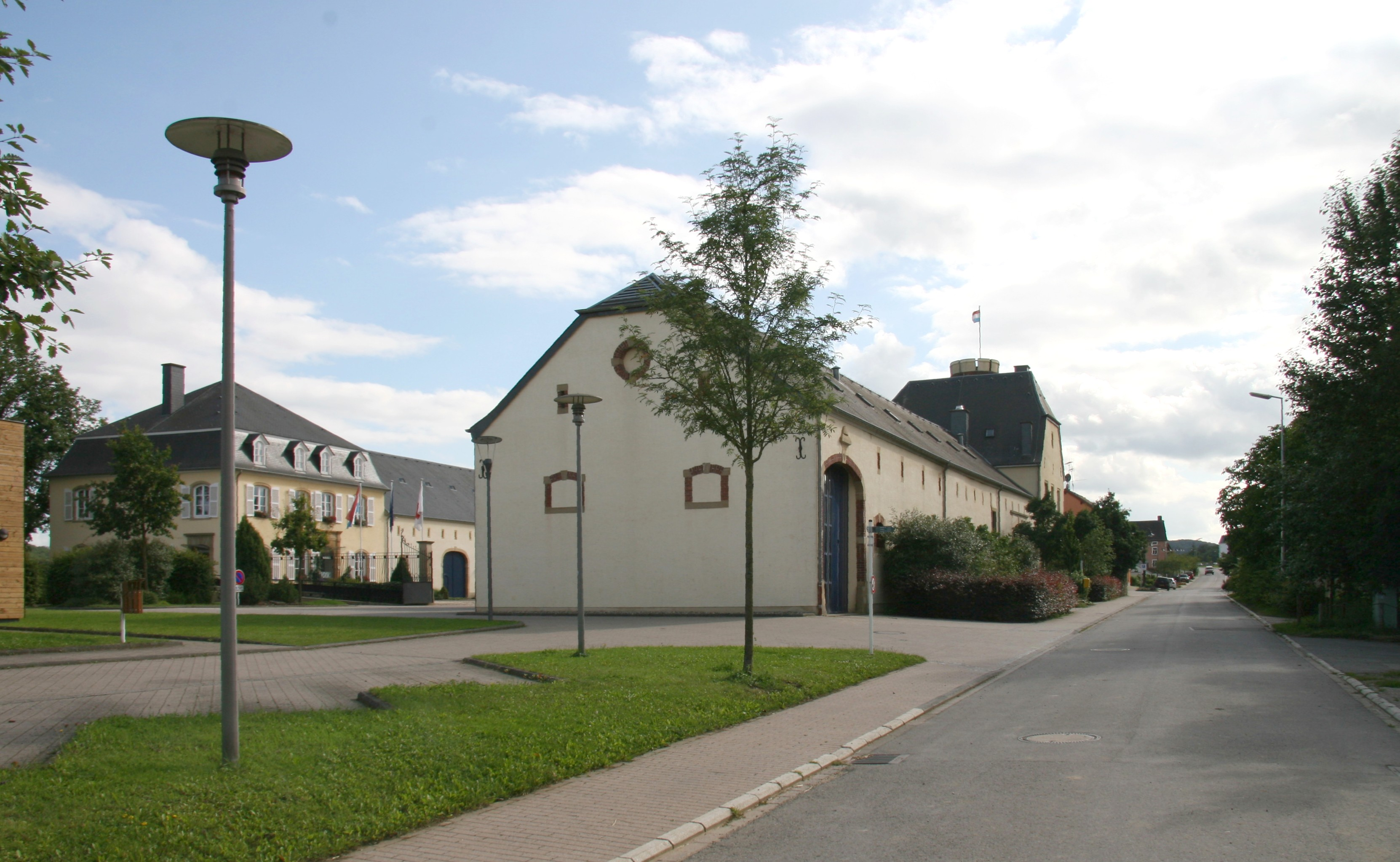
Town hall of the municipality of Betzdorf in Berg, Luxembourg

Berg (German pronunciation: [bɛʁk]; Luxembourgish: Bierg) is a village in the commune of Betzdorf, in eastern Luxembourg. As of September 2026, the village had a population of 415. It is the administrative centre of the commune.
