= Jean-Claude Pomonti =

French journalist

Jean-Claude Pomonti (born 27 April 1940) is a French journalist specializing in Southeast Asia.

== Biography ==
Jean-Claude Pomonti discovered Southeast Asia, which became his main field of interest, during a trip in 1965. He returned to the newspaper Le Monde in 1974 as correspondent in Bangkok, from where he covered the Vietnam War.

His criticisms of the Phnom Penh and Saigon regimes led to him being repeatedly banned from the Khmer Republic and the Republic of Vietnam.

In 1973, he won the Albert Londres Prize for his work. The following year, he was transferred to Nairobi, where he covered East Africa for the same daily until 1979, when he joined the Africa department at the newspaper's headquarters in Paris. In 1985, he became deputy head of the foreign service in charge of Asia, before returning to Bangkok in 1991, again as correspondent.

== Bibliography ==
- with Serge Thion (1971). Des courtisans aux partisans; essai sur la crise cambodgienne. Idées actuelles (in French). Vol. 230. Gallimard. p. 374.
- La Rage d'être vietnamien. Hist.Immed (in French). Éditions du Seuil. 1974. p. 249. ISBN 9782020023238.
- L'Afrique trahie (in French). Hachette. 1979. pp. 205. ISBN 9782010048234.
- Poussières de vie; Les petits chiffonniers de Phnom Penh. Les enfants du fleuve (in French). Vol. 1. Librairie Arthème Fayard. 1993. p. 211. ISBN 9782213031712.
- with Hugues Tertrais (1994). Viêtnam,, communistes et dragons (in French). Le Monde. p. 210. ISBN 978-2878990829.
- Poussières de vie; les enfants de la guerre. Les enfants du fleuve (in French). Vol. 2. Librairie Arthème Fayard. 1994. p. 231. ISBN 978-2213593371.
- Viêtnam, quand l'aube se lève. Reportages (in French). Philippe Picquier Publishing. 1998. ISBN 978-2877303323.
- Aceh L'histoire inachevée; La fière histoire d'une terre dévastée par les tsunamis. Documents (in French). Aux Lieux d'être. 2005. p. 99. ISBN 9782916063010.
- Un Vietnamien bien tranquille; L'extraordinaire histoire de l'espion qui défia l'Amérique. Document (in French). Éditions des Équateurs. 2006. p. 187. ISBN 9782849900345.
- Hanoï; regards (in French). Les Editions de La Frémillerie. 2010. p. 160. ISBN 9782359070163.
- Vietnam; L'éphémère et l'insubmersible. L'âme des peuples (in French). Nevicata. 2015. p. 90. ISBN 9782875230706.
- with Frédéric Amat (2011). La drôle de vie des expatriés au Cambodge (in French). Tuk Tuk éditions. p. 178. ISBN 9782350610207.
