= Philippe Grumbach =

French magazine editor and Soviet spy

- Born: 25 June 1925; Paris, France
- Died: 13 October 2003 (aged 78); Paris, France
- Occupations: Journalist editor-in-chief media owner communications consultant political advisor
- Spouse: Nicole Wisniak
- Children: Judith, Laurent, Maria, Thomas
- Parent(s): Henri Grumbach; Jacqueline Dalsheimer
- Espionage activity
- Allegiance: Soviet Union
- Agency: KGB
- Codename: Brok

Philippe Grumbach (1924–2003) was a French journalist and writer, who also engaged in film production. He worked at L'Express magazine for twenty-four years, becoming in the 1970s its editor-in-chief. In 2024, many years after his death, it was revealed that he had been a Soviet spy throughout his career.

== Early life and education ==
Philippe Grumbach was born on 25 June 1924 to a Jewish family in the 16th, the westernmost arrondissement of Paris. His father was Henri Grumbach, stockmarket specialist in arbitrage and his mother Jacqueline Dalsheimer. He completed his formative education at the capital's Lycée Janson-de-Sailly and then at the Lycée Périer in Marseille. He fled from France to the United States along with his mother and siblings in 1940 to escape the Nazis' and the regime's persecution of Jews in their home country.

== Journalist ==
Grumbach, in 1943, started working at the Voice of America New York radio station as a speaker and an assistant to the editor. The same year, he joined the US Army and fought along the French Resistance in Algeria. After France's liberation, he worked at the Ministry of Information, joining, in 1946, the AFP news agency and, in 1948, the Libération newspaper.

He joined the periodical L'Express, founded by journalist and "maverick" politician Jean-Jacques Servan-Schreiber, in 1954, becoming chief editor after two years. He left L'Express in 1963, and worked in various publications, such as the satirical Le Crapouillot, while he also founded the Pariscope cultural guide of the city. In 1971, he returned to L'Express as political editor. His appointment came after a crisis in the magazine caused by a rift between its owner and the editorial team, the result of which was the resignation of a number of top staff, including that of political editor Claude Imbert, who went on to assume the position of Paris-Match editor-in-chief.

After his public service years, Grumbach returned to journalism, working from 1984 onward at the conservative Le Figaro newspaper, where he was appointed deputy editorial director and, in 1986, introduced its Media page. In 1989, he became communications director for the advertising space purchasing group Carat-Espace and also worked as a consultant to press and multimedia communication corporations.

== Public service ==
In 1975, when Valéry Giscard d'Estaing was president, Grumbach, by appointment of the Jacques Chirac government, joined the state commission entrusted with "ensuring the quality of radio and television programs," where he served until 1981. During the period between 1977 and 1981, he was a member of High Council for the Audiovisual Industry and the Commission that oversaw the application of the "right to respond". He also served for many years, starting in 1978, as an administrator at the research center Institut français de l'éducation, engaged in the dissemination of French language and culture.

== Film producer ==
In 1981, Grumbach founded the Horizons company and, as its CEO, began producing films, among the most notable of which was Claude Chabrol's Les Fantômes du chapelier, titled The Hatter's Ghost in English.

== Political advisor ==
Grumbach was a close confidant of socialist politicians Pierre Mendès France and François Mitterrand, who became president. At the same time, he was close for several years to conservative president Valéry Giscard d'Estaing, as well as to prime minister Edgar Faure. In 1977, the satirical magazine Le Canard Enchainé described Grumbach as "one of the most listened-to advisors" of the French political elite.

== Personal life and death ==
Grumbach, in 1980, married Nicole Wisniak, director of Égoïste magazine, who was subsequently made a member of the Ordre des Arts et des Lettres, and they had one daughter, Judith. Grumbach had three children from two previous marriages: Laurent, Maria, and Thomas.

He died in 2003, aged 78, in Paris. Upon his passing, Minister of Culture Jean-Jacques Aillagon described Grumbach as "one of the most striking and respected figures of the French press," saluting "his extensive experience in the media" and "his deep knowledge of the world of communication."

== Spy ==
A little more than twenty years after Grumbach's death, on 13 February 2024, L'Express published the exclusive revelation that its former editor-in-chief had been a spy for the Soviet Union.

Grumbach was recruited by the KGB when he was 22 years old, in 1946, at the beginning of the Cold War. He was the person behind the code name Brok given without any further information in the reports handed over to western intelligence agencies by former KGB agent and defector Vasili Mitrokhin in the 1990s. According to the Mitrokhin Archive, KGB's instructions to Brok were not to penetrate French media in order to affect its content or that of l'Express but, instead, to relay information from the high echelons of French political life and power. In one exception to these guidelines, Yuri Andropov, the head of KGB himself, was involved in an operation of disinformation assigned to Brok, concerning the 1974 French presidential election. Grumbach, arguably KGB's longest-serving journalist recruit, was considered by the Soviet agency in the 1970s one of its most highly regarded agents in France. However, in 1981, the Soviets terminated their collaboration with Brok, who by then was paid a yearly sum of 100 thousand francs, assessing his reports as no longer reliable.

Journalist Thierry Wolton started searching in the early 2000s into Grumbach's past and was preparing an article about him possibly being a spy, to which Grumbach responded by threatening a lawsuit for defamation and Wolton dropped the search.

In 2023, Etienne Girard, the social affairs editor of L'Express, who had worked in the past under Grumbach, was approached by a friend who informed him that a student, in 2018, while searching the Mitrokhin Archive at the Churchill College, Cambridge, for his PhD, found a reference to the magazine, along with mentions of an agent Brok, whose biographical details matched those of Grumbach. Girard examined the Archive material and, after locating Grumbach's name itself written in Russian, alerted the French counter-espionage service. The subsequent clandestine investigation confirmed Grumbach's espionage activities and Girard started on the article that would expose his former editor-in-chief as a Soviet spy. Nicole Wisniak stated, after the article appeared, that her husband, soon after shaking off Wolton's approaches, had revealed to her that he had been indeed a long-term spy for the Soviet Union.

== See also ==
- Martel affair
- Vladimir Vetrov
- Soviet espionage in the United States
