= Thaïs d'Escufon =

French far-right activist

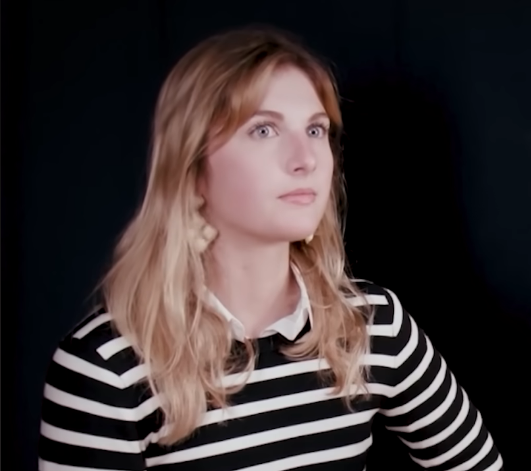
- Thaïs d'Escufon in 2023
- Born: Anne-Thaïs du Tertre; August 28, 1999 (age 27); Toulouse
- Known for: Activism
- Movement: identitarian, tradwife

Thaïs d'Escufon (born August 28, 1999 in Toulouse) is a French antifeminist and a far right conservative activist. She was spokesperson of Génération identitaire from 2018 to its dissolution by the French government in 2021.

== Biography ==
=== Family and studies ===
Thaïs d'Escufon is the pseudonym of Anne-Thaïs du Tertre d'Escoeuffant, born August 28, 1999 (age 27) in Toulouse in a large Catholic family. (Note: The du Tertre family is a noble family originating from the Boulonnais region whose lineage goes back to 1468.) She was raised in Haute-Garonne in Drémil-Lafage, ten kilometers from Toulouse.

=== Activities and affiliations ===
D'Escufon began her activism as a member of Action française, then she joined Génération identitaire. In October 2018, she participated in an action against the premises of the ONG SOS Méditerranée. She came to national attention in June 2020, during a counter-protest against the Truth and Justice for Adama Committee. With this publicity, she became de facto and later officially spokesperson of Génération identitaire. She often intervened in medias as spokesperson of the organisation.

From September 2020 to January 2021, D'Escufon was community manager for the executive officer of the National Rally, Sébastien Chenu.

In April 2021, after the dissolution of Génération identitaire, with ex-members of the organisation, D'Escufon created the ASLA, an association presenting itself as a whistleblowers protection association.

During the 2022 French presidential election, D'Escufon supported the candidate Éric Zemmour.

=== Radio ===
In August 2024, D'Escufon was recruited on Europe 1 as columnist for Cyril Hanouna's show On marche sur la tête.

=== Court cases ===
D'Escufon's political actions and statements involved her in multiple court cases.

In December 2021 she filed a complaint for sexual assault and kidnapping. A man allegedly entered her home when she was returning from a sports session. She also stated that the man presented himself as a Tunisian immigrant.

== Political positioning ==
D'Escufon is part of the Identitarian movement. She relays on Twitter the theory of Great Replacement and affirms that she defends the "white race".

A traditionalist conservative and antifeminist, she belongs to the tradwife movement.

== Notes and references ==
=== Notes ===
1. The du Tertre family is a noble family originating from the Boulonnais region whose lineage goes back to 1468.

== See also ==
- History of far-right movements in France
