= Kevin Grumbach =

American physician

- Education: UCSF School of Medicine
- Occupations: Physician, academic and advocate for single-payer health insurance

Kevin Grumbach is an American physician, academic and advocate for single-payer health insurance. He is the Chair of the Department of Family and Community Medicine at the University of California, San Francisco.

Grumbach is an outspoken supporter of universal health care, specifically in the framework of a single-payer, Medicare-for-all system. He advocates increased focus and funding for primary care and preventative medicine, especially in underrepresented inner-city and rural areas. Grumbach was involved in creating some of the primary care provisions in the Patient Protection and Affordable Care Act of 2010.

== Publications ==
- Bodenheimer T, Grumbach K. Understanding health policy: A clinical approach. McGraw Hill-Lange, 4th edition, 2004. ISBN 978-1260454260
- K. Grumbach. Fighting hand to hand over physician workforce policy. Health Affairs. Issue: 5. 21: 13–27, 2002.
- Grumbach, T. Bodenheimer. A primary care home for Americans: Putting the house in order. Journal of the American Medical Association. Issue: 7. 288: 889–893, 2002.
- Saba GW, Wong ST, Schillinger D, Fernandez A, Somkin CP, Wilson CC, Grumbach K. Shared decision making and the experience of partnership in primary care. Annals of Family Medicine. 4: 54–62, 2006.
- Grumbach K, Chen E. Effectiveness of University of California postbaccalaureate premedical programs in increasing medical school matriculation for minority and disadvantaged students. Journal of the American Medical Association. 296: 1079–85, 2006.
- Grumbach K, Mold JW. A health care cooperative extension service: transforming primary care and community health. Journal of the American Medical Association. 24: 2589–91, 2009.
- Bodenheimer T, Grumbach K, Berenson RA. A lifeline for primary care. New England Journal of Medicine. 360: 2693–6, 2009.
