= Grumbach, Bad Langensalza =

Grumbach
- Ortsteil of Bad Langensalza
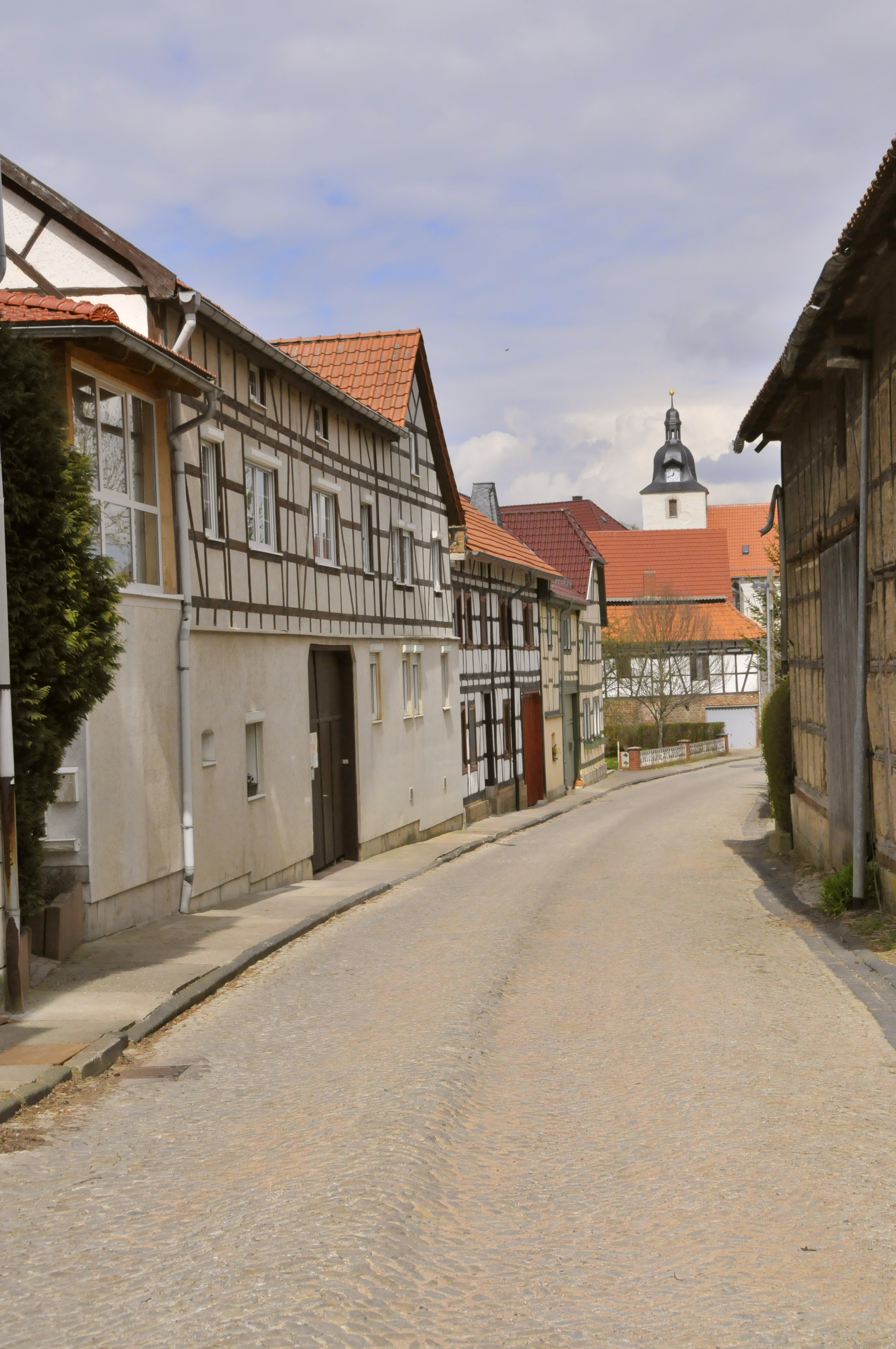
- In the Hintergasse

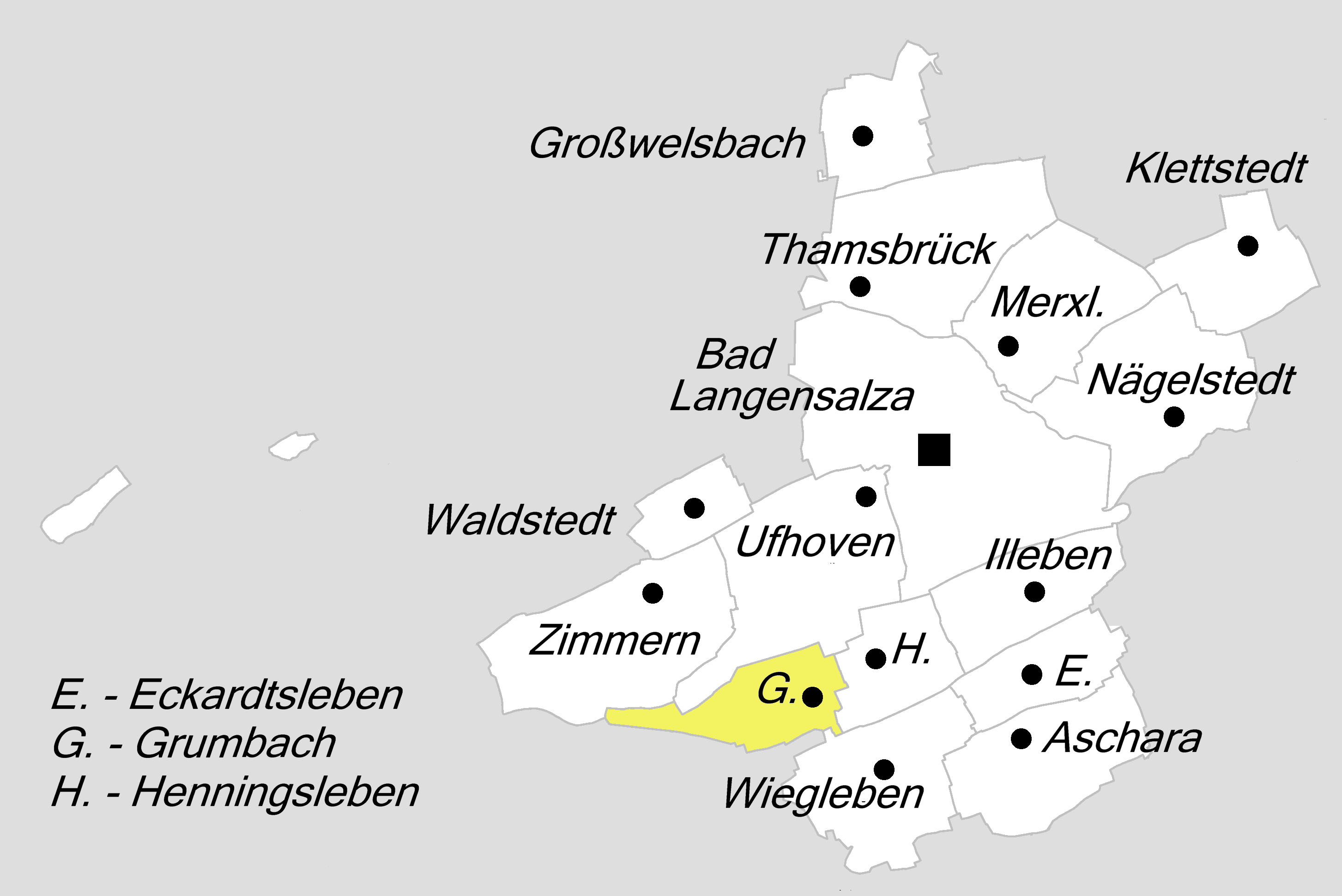
- Location of Grumbach within Bad Langensalza
- Interactive map of Grumbach
- Location within Germany Location within Thuringia
- Coordinates: 51°03′56″N 10°36′52″E
- Country: Germany
- State: Thuringia
- District: Unstrut-Hainich-Kreis
- Town: Bad Langensalza
- First mentioned: 1206

Government
  - Mayor: Sebastian Schmidt

Area
  - Total: 5.21 km^{2} (2.01 sq mi)
- Elevation: 294 m (965 ft)

Population (2020-12-31)
  - Total: 221
  - Density: 42.4/km^{2} (110/sq mi)
- Time zone: UTC+01:00 (CET)
  - Summer (DST): UTC+02:00 (CEST)
- Postal codes: 99947
- Dialling codes: 03603
- Website: badlangensalza.de

Grumbach (pronounced [ˈɡʁʊmbax]) is a village and a quarter of the town of Bad Langensalza in Thuringia, central Germany.

== Location ==
Grumbach lies 5.23 kilometres (3.25 mi) south-southwest of the spa town of Bad Langensalza (measured from Marktkirche, "market church"). The village's territory, which lies north of the Steinberg (362.1 metres (1,188 ft) above sea level (NN)), forms the connection between the Hainich National Park and the Fahner Höhe together with the Große Harth (367.3 metres (1,205 ft) above sea level (NN)), the Wieglebener Höhe (Teufelsberg at 358 metres (1,175 ft) above sea level (NN)) and the Ascharaer Höhe (312 metres (1,024 ft) above sea level (NN)). Grumbach is a dead-end village: the only road out of Grumbach leads to the neighbouring village of Henningsleben. A well-maintained agricultural road (Schwichingsweg) leads to the Harthhaus on the Bundesstraße 84, 2.43 kilometres (1.51 mi) to the west, a former customs house on the border of the districts of Gotha and Unstrut-Hainich and now an excursion destination. Another agricultural road connects the village with Wiegleben, 1.89 kilometres (1.17 mi) to the south.

== History ==
Grumbach was first mentioned in a document in 1206.

The village was incorporated into Bad Langensalza on 1 April 1993.

== Sights ==
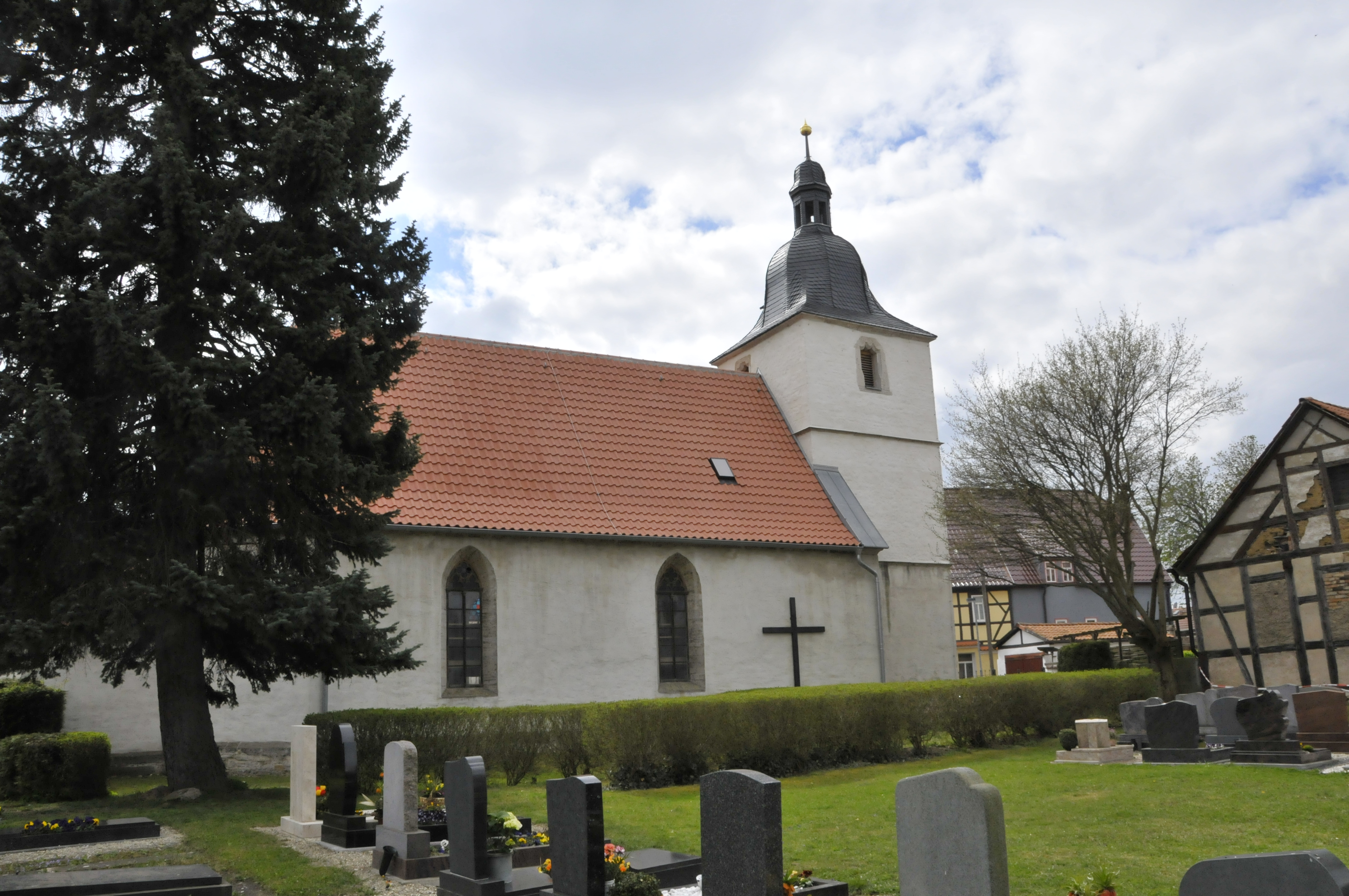
St Vincentius's Church

- The church of St Vincentius dates from 1607. The previous building, which was on the same site, was destroyed by lightning.
