= Yves Cuau =

French journalist and writer (1934–2025)

- Born: 10 September 1934; Boulogne-Billancourt, France
- Died: 25 August 2025 (aged 90); Paris, France
- Education: University of Paris; Sciences Po
- Occupations: Journalist, writer
- Employer: Le Figaro

Yves Cuau (10 September 1934 – 25 August 2025) was a French journalist and writer.

== Life and career ==
Cuau graduated in law and was a student at the Institut d'études politiques de Paris. He made his debut in 1960 at the foreign service of Le Figaro. He died in Paris on 25 August 2025, at the age of 90.

== Works ==
- 1968: Israël attaque;5 June 1967. Ce jour-là. Paris: Robert Laffont. pp. 342 + 15. ;
- 1971: with Max Clos. La Revanche des deux vaincus. Paris: Éditions et publications premières. p. 244..

== Prizes and distinctions ==
1968: Albert Londres Prize for Israël attaque.
