= Anne Poiret =

French journalist and documentary filmmaker

Anne Poiret (born December 6, 1976) is a French journalist and documentary filmmaker. She has won numerous prizes and awards, including the 2007 Albert Londres Prize, the 2022 International Emmy Awards for best documentary, and the 2024 Emmy Award for Outstanding Investigative Documentary. She focuses on underreported conflicts, investigating a range of topics related to war and post-war situations.

== Education ==
Poiret completed a B.A. in history from the University of Paris X Nanterre, and then studied at the Paris Institute of Political Studies. She graduated in 1999 and the following year completed coursework toward a master's degree in journalism at New York University.

== Career ==
Poiret has worked for various editorial offices and news magazines, including C dans l’air on France 5, "Envoyé Spécial" on France 2, as well as "Arte reportage" on Arte. She writes and directs documentaries about topics such as: aftermath of armed conflicts, human and political consequences of wars, and actions of the United Nations and other international non-governmental organizations.

Her first film, Muttur: Crime against Humanitarians, investigates the unsolved murder of 17 humanitarian workers in Sri Lanka. It earned the prestigious Albert Londres Prize.

Many of her subsequent films focus on countries going through postwar reconstruction, such as Iraq and the Republic of South Sudan. She has also investigated the genocide of the Herero and Namas in Namibia, as well as the situation in the regions of Donbass, Kashmir, and Syria

Much of Poiret's work questions the actions of public authorities and international companies (e.g. Epidemics: the invisible threat, Welcome to Refugeestan or My country makes weapons).

Her documentaries are usually released first on French public television network; many are subsequently broadcast on European, Canadian, Australian, Japanese and the Middle Eastern TV channels.

One of her most recent documentaries, Iraq’s Lost Generation, won the 2022 International Emmy Awards for best documentary. Another one, Global Spyware Scandal: Exposing Pegasus, won the 2024 Emmy Award for Outstanding Investigative Documentary.

== Documentaries ==
- 2007: Muttur: a Crime Against Humanitarians
- 2012: Namibia, the Genocide of the Second Reich
- 2013: State Builders
- 2014: Epidemics, the Invisible Threat
- 2015: Libya: the Impossible Nation State
- 2016: Cachemire, au cœur d'une poudrière
- 2016: Welcome to Refugeestan
- 2017: The Envoy, Inside Syria peace negotiations
- 2018: My Country Makes Weapons
- 2019: Mosul After the War
- 2021: Iraq's Lost Generation
- 2022: Ukraine, the Road to War
- 2023: Global Spyware Scandal: Exposing Pegasus

=== Iraq's lost generation ===
Her first Emmy-award winning documentary, Iraq's Lost Generation, focuses on the “Cubs of the Caliphate” a generation of young and forgotten victims of the war against the Islamic State. These are the children of families who had pledged allegiance to the caliphate and are now denied any legal existence.

The film was sold on 20 networks including Al Jazeera English, BBC Arabic and NHK. It has already received multiple awards, including the 2022 International Emmy Awards for best documentary.

=== Global Spyware Scandal: Exposing Pegasus ===
Her first Emmy-award winning film, Global Spyware Scandal: Exposing Pegasus, is a two-part documentary produced by PBS Frontline and Forbidden Films (a branch of Forbidden Stories). This series delves into the Pegasus spyware developed by the Israeli NSO Group, which has been sold to multiple governments worldwide. The investigation, part of the broader Pegasus Project, reveals the use of the spyware against journalists, human rights activists, and individuals close to Jamal Khashoggi. The series premiered in early 2023, and it won the 2024 Emmy Award for Outstanding Investigative Documentary.

== Books ==
- L'ultime tabou: Femmes pédophiles, Femmes incestueuses, Éditions Patrick Robin, 2006, 189 pages (ISBN 2-35228-000-1)
- Mon pays vend des armes, Éditions Les Arènes, 2019, 297 pages (ISBN 2-7112-0106-6)
- Mahar, le lionceau, ou l'enfance perdue des jeunes soldats de Daech, with Lars Horneman, Éditions Delcourt, 2024, 144 pages (ISBN 978-2413044109)

== Awards ==
- 2007: Albert-Londres award for Muttur: A crime against Humanitarian
- 2013: Special Jury Award at Watch Doc human rights in film Warsaw for State Builders
- 2013: Etoile de la scam for Namibia, the genocide of the second Reich
- 2021: Special mention at MoveIT Festival Dresden
- 2017: Étoile de la Scam Prize 2017 for Welcome to Refugeestan
- 2020: Special Jury award FIGRA for Mosul after the war
- 2021: Special merit award UNICEF Innocenti Film Festival (UIFF) for Iraq's lost generation
- 2022: Best documentary shot abroad Enfance Majuscule award
- 2022: Audience Award at Figra
- 2022: International Emmy awards for Iraq's lost generation
- 2024: Emmy Award for Outstanding Investigative Documentary.
