= François Hauter =

François Hauter (born 1951) is a French senior reporter, a former chief editor for Le Figaro and correspondent in Africa, China and the United-States. He won the Albert Londres Prize in 1986 and the Louis Hachette prize in 2008.

He was born in France, in Alsace where he spent his childhood. Very early, he went to America. He was a war reporter in Lebanon, Chad, Cambodia and Afghanistan. He has been a member of the Albert London Prize jury since 1988 and is now a writer.

== Works ==
- 2002: François Hauter (2001). Rouge glacé. Littérature française (in French). Stock. p. 162. ISBN 978-2234054455.
- 2008: François Hauter (2008). Planète chinoise. Documents (in French). Planète chinoise. p. 275. ISBN 978-2355360077.
- 2010: François Hauter (2010). Chroniques d'Amérique. Carnet de route (in French). Carnets Nord. p. 233. ISBN 978-2355360428.
- 2012: François Hauter (2012). Le bonheur d'être français. Documents (in French). Fayard. p. 256. ISBN 978-2213669083.
