= Christophe Weber =

Christophe Weber is a French pharmaceutical executive who served as president and chief executive officer of Takeda Pharmaceutical Company from April 2015 to June 2026. He was the first foreign chief executive in the Japanese company's history. During his tenure, he led Takeda's US$62 billion acquisition of Shire plc, which was completed in January 2019.

== Career ==
Before joining Takeda, Weber spent about two decades at GlaxoSmithKline, holding senior positions in Europe, Asia and the United States. He joined Takeda as chief operating officer in April 2014 and became chief executive on April 1, 2015.

In 2016, Takeda reorganized its research and development operations under Weber, concentrating research on three therapeutic areas and centralizing activities in San Diego, Boston and Shonan, Japan.

== Acquisition of Shire ==
Takeda agreed to buy Shire in May 2018 and completed the acquisition on January 8, 2019. The transaction expanded Takeda's rare-disease business and its presence in the United States. Weber argued that the purchase was necessary to make Takeda a global pharmaceutical company.

The proposal drew investor criticism over its price and financing. During the takeover process, Takeda's share price fell by nearly 20 percent, and the company borrowed about US$30 billion to finance the purchase, after which credit-rating agencies downgraded its debt. A 2023 retrospective by Reuters Breakingviews credited Takeda with reducing acquisition-related debt, increasing cost savings, improving operating margins and diversifying revenue. It nonetheless concluded that the acquisition had delivered no shareholder value during its first five years, citing Takeda's roughly negative 2 percent total shareholder return from the emergence of the takeover plan through the time of the review.

== Succession ==
In January 2025, Takeda announced that Julie Kim would succeed Weber after an 18-month transition. Kim became president and chief executive on June 24, 2026, when Weber retired from the company and its board.
