= L'Express =

French weekly news magazine

- L'Express magazine cover, 8–15 January 2020
- Editor-in-Chief: Arnaud Bouillin
- Categories: News magazine
- Frequency: Weekly
- Circulation: 215,093 (total, 2022)
- Founder: Jean-Jacques Servan-Schreiber and Françoise Giroud
- Founded: 1953; 73 years ago
- Company: Groupe L'Express (Alain Weill)
- Country: France
- Based in: Paris
- Language: French
- Website: lexpress.fr
- ISSN: 0014-5270 (print); 2491-4282 (web)

L'Express (French pronunciation: [lɛkspʁɛs], stylized in all caps) is a French weekly news magazine headquartered in Paris. The weekly stands at the political centre-right in the French media landscape, and has a lifestyle supplement, L'Express Styles, and a job supplement, Réussir. Founded in 1953 by Jean-Jacques Servan-Schreiber and Françoise Giroud, L'Express would be considered France's first American-style news weekly. L'Express is one of the three major French news weeklies alongside Le Nouvel Obs and Le Point.

== History and profile ==
L'Express was co-founded in 1953 by Jean-Jacques Servan-Schreiber, future president of the Radical Party, and Françoise Giroud, who had earlier edited Elle and went on to become France's first minister of women's affairs in 1974 and minister of culture in 1976. L'Express' first issue was released on Saturday 16 May 1953, at the corner of the end of the Indochina War and the Algerian War which was about to break out. It was founded as a weekly supplement to the newspaper Les Échos.

The magazine was supportive of the policies of Pierre Mendès-France in Indochina and, in general, had a left-of-centre orientation. The magazine opposed the Algerian War, and especially the use of torture. In March 1958, as a result of an article of Jean-Paul Sartre reviewing the book La Question by Henri Alleg, the magazine was prevented from being published by the French Government. In order to resume publication, L'Express had to print a new issue without the incriminated article. François Mauriac was a regular contributor with his Bloc-Notes column but left L'Express when Charles de Gaulle returned to power.

In 1964, L'Express was modelled on the US magazine Time and the German magazine Der Spiegel. That same year, a number of journalists, including Jean Daniel and André Gorz, quit L'Express to found Le Nouvel Observateur. Servan-Schreiber turned L'Express into a less politically engaged publication, and the circulation rose from 150,000 to 500,000 copies in three years. The magazine's sales surged in 1965 with its investigation into the Ben Barka case, which had shaken the Gaullist government.

In 1971, as a result of Servan-Schreiber's political activities as a deputy of the Radical Party, nine journalists of L'Express, including Claude Imbert, left the magazine and created Le Point to counter what they perceived as the "current breed of French intellectuals in the press and elsewhere, with their leftist dogmas and complacent nihilism". Journalist Philippe Grumbach, who, after joining the magazine in 1954, had left in 1963 to pursue independent work, was appointed political editor. He left in 1978. Earlier in 1977, Servan-Schreiber sold his magazine to Jimmy Goldsmith.

Jean-François Revel became director in October 1978. He was replaced by Yves Cuau in May 1981. The same year the magazine had a circulation of 507,000 copies. In 1986, L'Express started a news exchange cooperation with the Belgium-based French language news magazine Le Vif/L’Express. In 1987, L'Express had a circulation of 555,000 copies and 554,000 copies in 1988. The same year the magazine was sold to C. G. E. Yann de l'Ecotais became the new director and served in the post until 1994, when he was replaced by Christine Ockrent. In 1995, L'Express was sold to CEP communications, a filial of Havas, and Denis Jeambar became the new director. On 22 April 1996, Christophe Barbier began working for the magazine as editor-in-chief of the political department.

In 1998, after Vivendi took control of Havas, the magazine returned under its control. After the collapse of Vivendi, L'Express was sold in 2002 to Socpresse (80% owned by Dassault Group). From 2001 to 2002, L'Express had a circulation of 424,000 copies. It was 548,195 copies between 2003 and 2004. L'Express was acquired by Roularta Media Group in 2006. The same year the circulation of the magazine was 547,000 copies. Barbier was the editorial director from 2006 to 2016.

In 2014, Roularta sold L'Express to Franco-Israeli billionaire and media entrepreneur Patrick Drahi, founder and owner of Altice. The magazine had lost several million euros due to the COVID-19 pandemic crisis. After buying 51% of the capital (the rest remaining in the hands of Altice), Alain Weill revitalized L'Express in 2020 by emulating the approach of The Economist. Weill refocused the magazine on four themes: international, economics, politics, and ideas. New columnists were hired, such as Marion Van Renterghem (renowned reporter and specialized in the European field), Jean-Laurent Cassely (writer and journalist discussing sociological and urban issues), Jean-Marc Jancovici (engineer, pro-nuclear, and "pioneer of the climate cause"), Robin Rivaton (liberal essayist, close to Bruno Le Maire and Valérie Pécresse), and Emmanuelle Mignon (ex-director of Nicolas Sarkozy's cabinet at the Élysée Palace). Slowly relaunching the magazine, Weill decided to drop the entertainment news section and focus on an audience of lawyers, business executives, physicians, pharmacists, teachers, and students.

In 2021, between 65 and 67 journalists worked for L'Express out of a total of 120 employees. L'Express is published weekly.

== Notable staff ==
=== Journalists ===
- Raymond Aron
- Christophe Barbier
- Albert Camus
- Madeleine Chapsal
- Michèle Cotta
- Franz-Olivier Giesbert
- André Gorz
- Philippe Grumbach
- Danièle Heymann
- Jean-François Kahn
- Christian Makarian
- François Mauriac
- Catherine Nay
- Jean-François Revel

=== Collaborators ===
- André Malraux
- Jean-Paul Sartre
