= Aschara =

- Ortsteil of Bad Langensalza
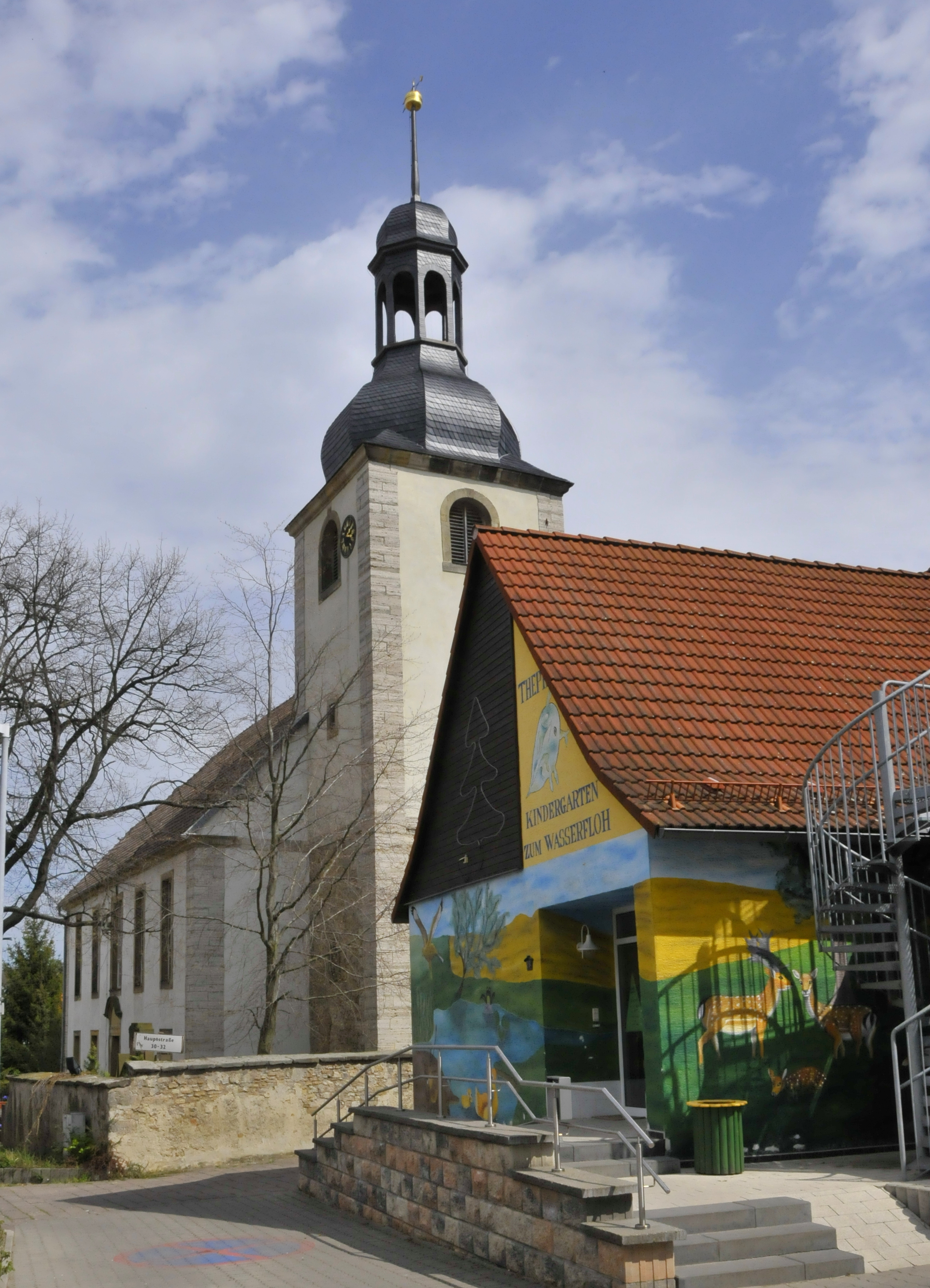
- Kindergarten and church

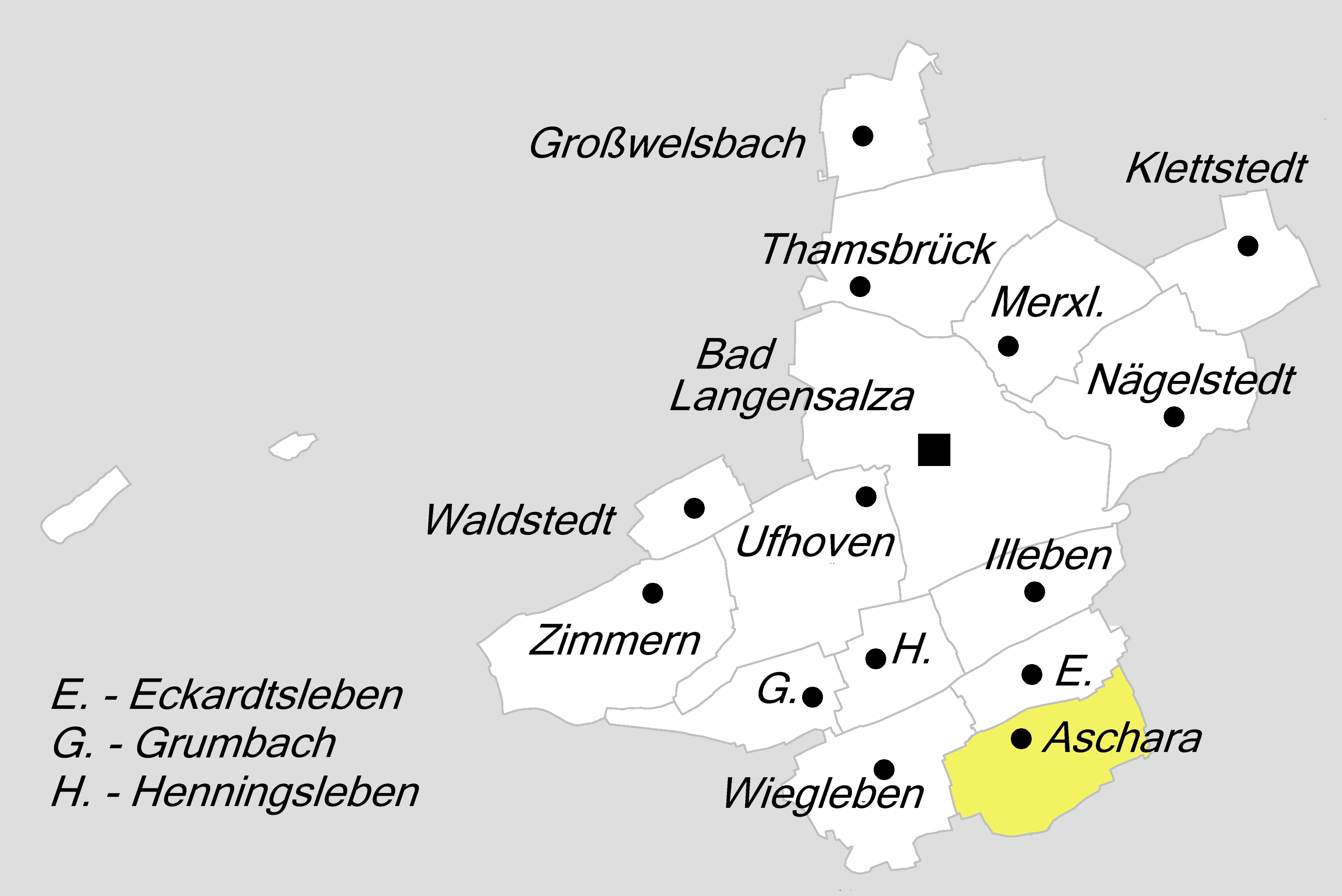
- Location of Aschara within Bad Langensalza
- Interactive map of Aschara
- Location within Germany Location within Thuringia
- Coordinates: 51°03′20″N 10°40′49″E
- Country: Germany
- State: Thuringia
- District: Unstrut-Hainich-Kreis
- Town: Bad Langensalza
- First mentioned: 786

Government
  - Mayor: Dieter Kraußlach

Area
  - Total: 8.09 km^{2} (3.12 sq mi)
- Elevation: 243 m (797 ft)

Population (2020-12-31)
  - Total: 440
  - Density: 54/km^{2} (140/sq mi)
- Time zone: UTC+01:00 (CET)
  - Summer (DST): UTC+02:00 (CEST)
- Postal codes: 99947
- Dialling codes: 03603
- Website: badlangensalza.de

Aschara (pronounced [ˈaʃaːʁaː]) is a village and part of the town of Bad Langensalza in Thuringia, central Germany, with 440 inhabitants.

== Geography ==
The village lies about 6 kilometres (3.7 mi) south of the outskirts of Bad Langensalza on the south-eastern slope of the Ascherberg hill (310 metres (1,020 ft) above sea level (NN)), along the Weißer Bach stream. The nearest villages are Eckardtsleben to the north, Burgtonna to the east, Ballstädt to the southeast, Westhausen to the south, Wiegleben to the west and Henningsleben to the northwest. Transport links are via the Bundesstraße (federal highway) 247 between Gotha and Bad Langensalza, branching off at Aschara via the 2125 rural road, and from Burgtonna via the Ascharer Straße. The Fahner Höhe mountain range lies about 4 kilometres (2.5 mi) west of the village.

== History ==
In the list of goods of the Hersfeld Abbey, the village appears among Charlemagne's donations to the monastery, which had been made until the death of its founder Lullus in 786. Thus, Aschara celebrated its (at least) 1,225th anniversary in 2011. In 932, Henry the Fowler exchanged the village for other possessions to the Abbot of Hersfeld Abbey. The Lords of Aschare gave the village to the Lords of Salza (Bad Langensalza) and these (probably around 1410) to the Lords of Gleichen. In 1634, as a result of a succession contract, the village and the lordship of Tonna passed to the baron of Tautenburg and Frauenprießnitz, and after his death in 1640 to the count of Waldeck. By deed of sale in 1677, Aschara fell to Frederick I, Duke of Saxe-Gotha-Altenburg.

To the north of the village rises a hill, on the southern side of which vines were grown in the Middle Ages, albeit with poor yields. Today, the hill is bisected by the railway line to Bad Langensalza; the western part is the Weinberg ("vineyard"), 268 metres (879 ft) high, on which stands a Dutch windmill dating from 1848, and the eastern part is called Wartberg.

On 1 January 1994, Aschara was incorporated into Bad Langensalza.

== Sights ==
- Church: According to Beck, there was a small chapel above the village, presumably on the vineyard, of which remains were still visible in the 18th century. A lime tree was planted in the place. The church, which was built before the Reformation (i. e. before 1517), had to be demolished in 1748 because it was dilapidated. The foundation stone for the construction of St Peter's Church was laid on 28 May 1749. Inside the church, there is an organ built in 1751–52 by organ builder Johann Valentin Nößler.
- Altes Backhaus ("Old Bakehouse"): Restored half-timbered house in the centre of the village
- Stone cross (51°3′43.5″N 10°40′54.3″E): About 600 metres (2,000 ft) north of the village, there is an old stone cross under a tree on the western side of the road in the direction of Eckardtsleben. Here, on the boundary to Eckardtsleben, a dirt road branches off to the west. The stone cross also has other names in the vernacular: Schwedenkreuz, Taternkreuz. Field names also refer to the cross: Beim Kreuzchen, Totenrain. The cross has slightly widened arms towards the outside with rounded outline edges and a small cup on the top of the head. The background of the erection is unknown.
- Former windmill (51°3′38.2″N 10°41′1.6″E): The remains of a former windmill stand on the Weinberg ("vineyard"), 268 metres (879 ft) above sea level (NN).
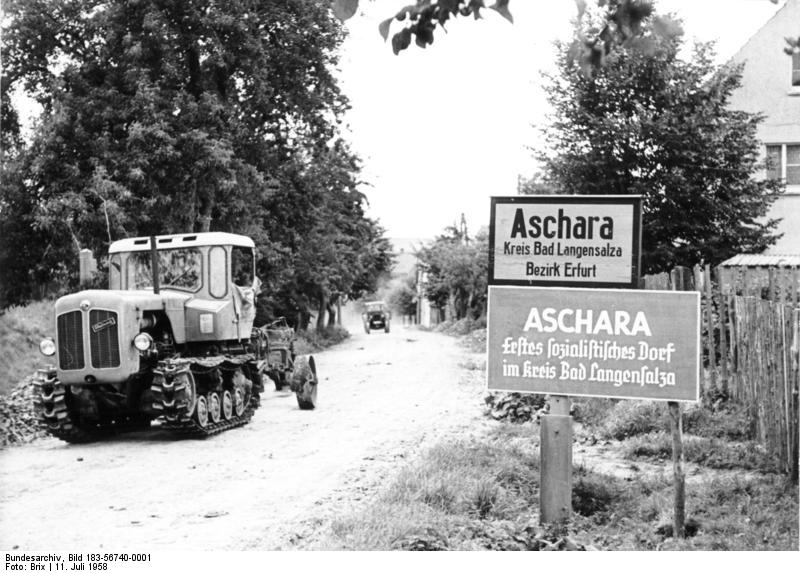
Entrance to Aschara on 11 July 1958: "First socialist village in the district of Bad Langensalza"

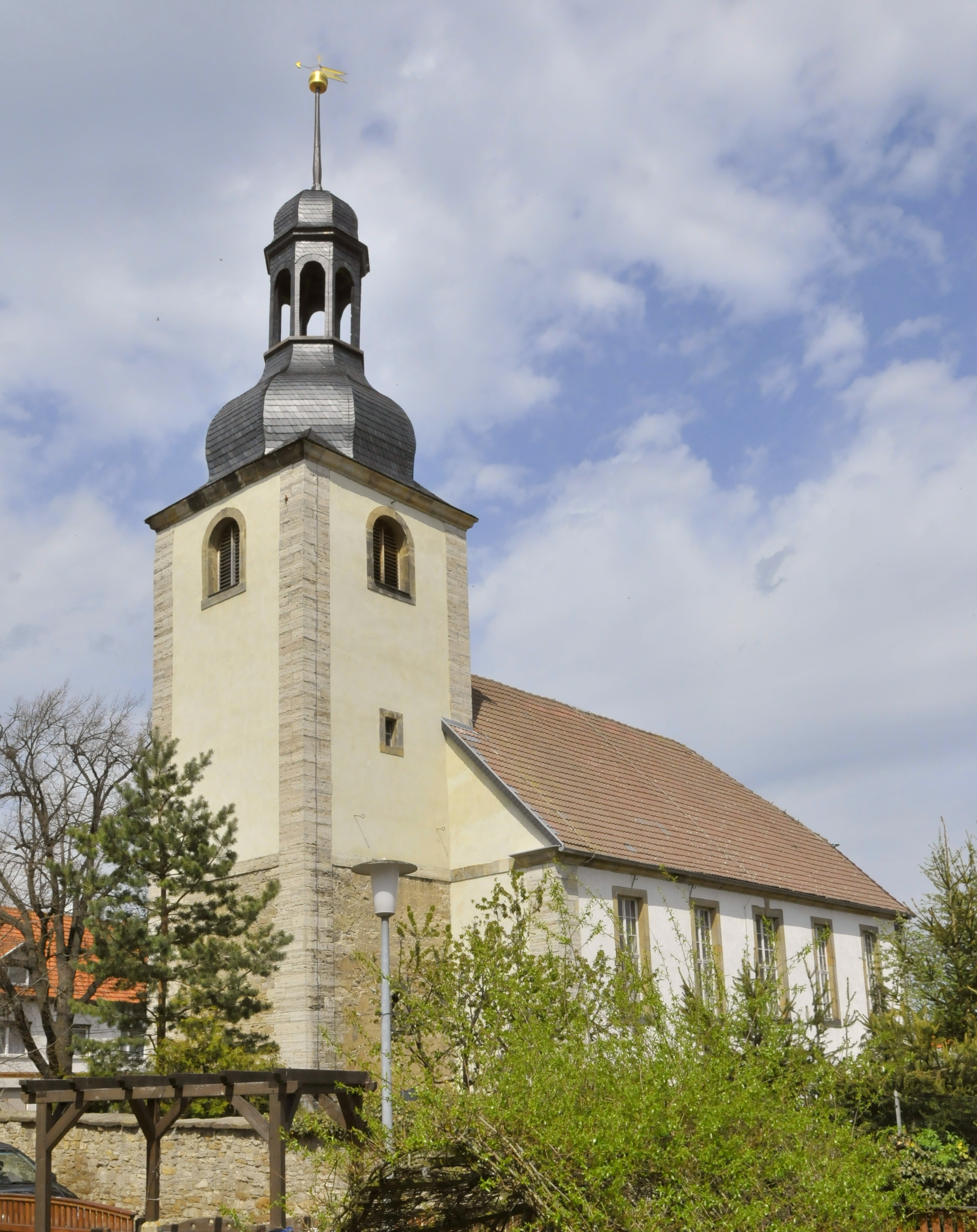
St Peter's Church

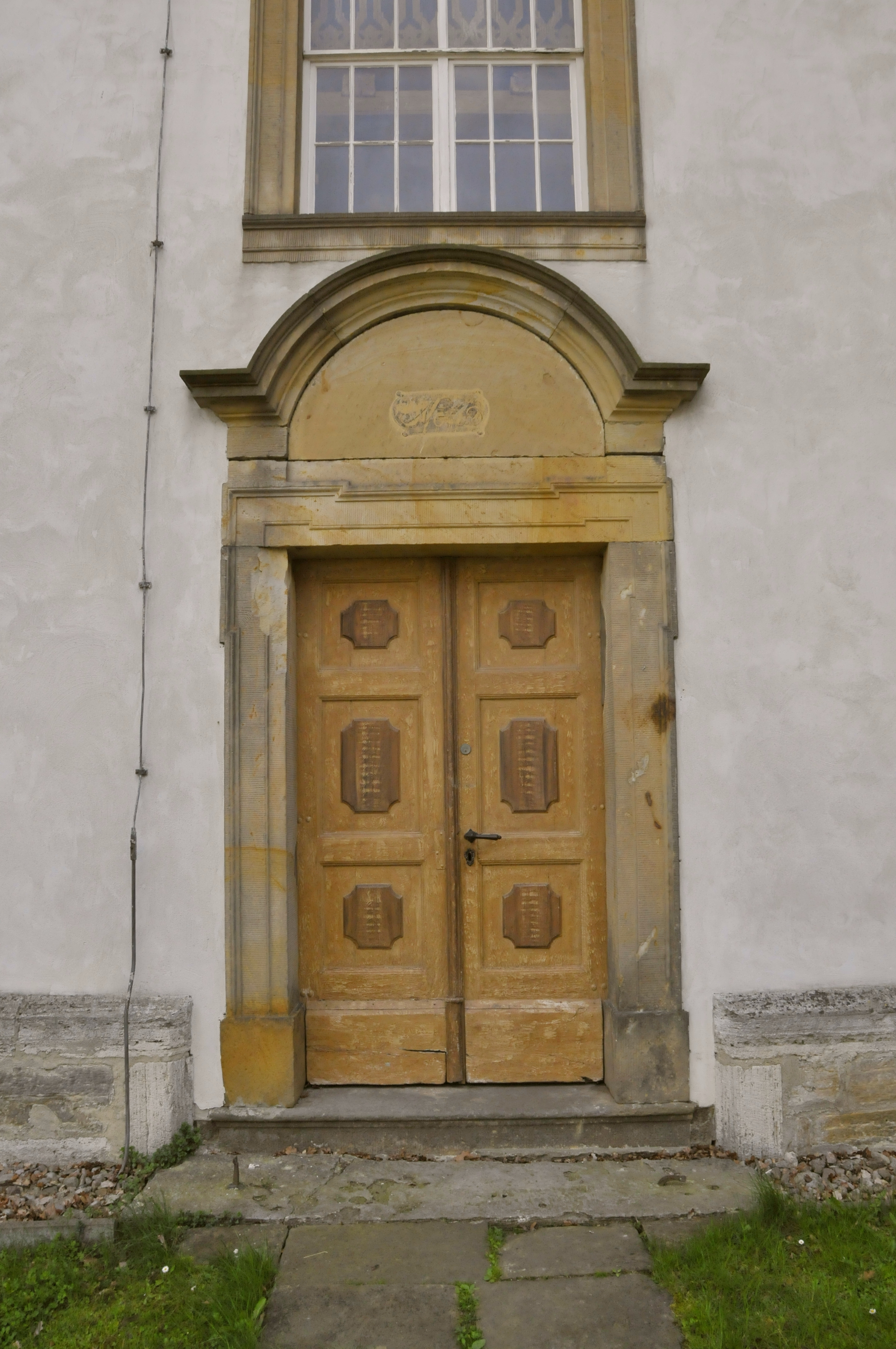
The church's portal

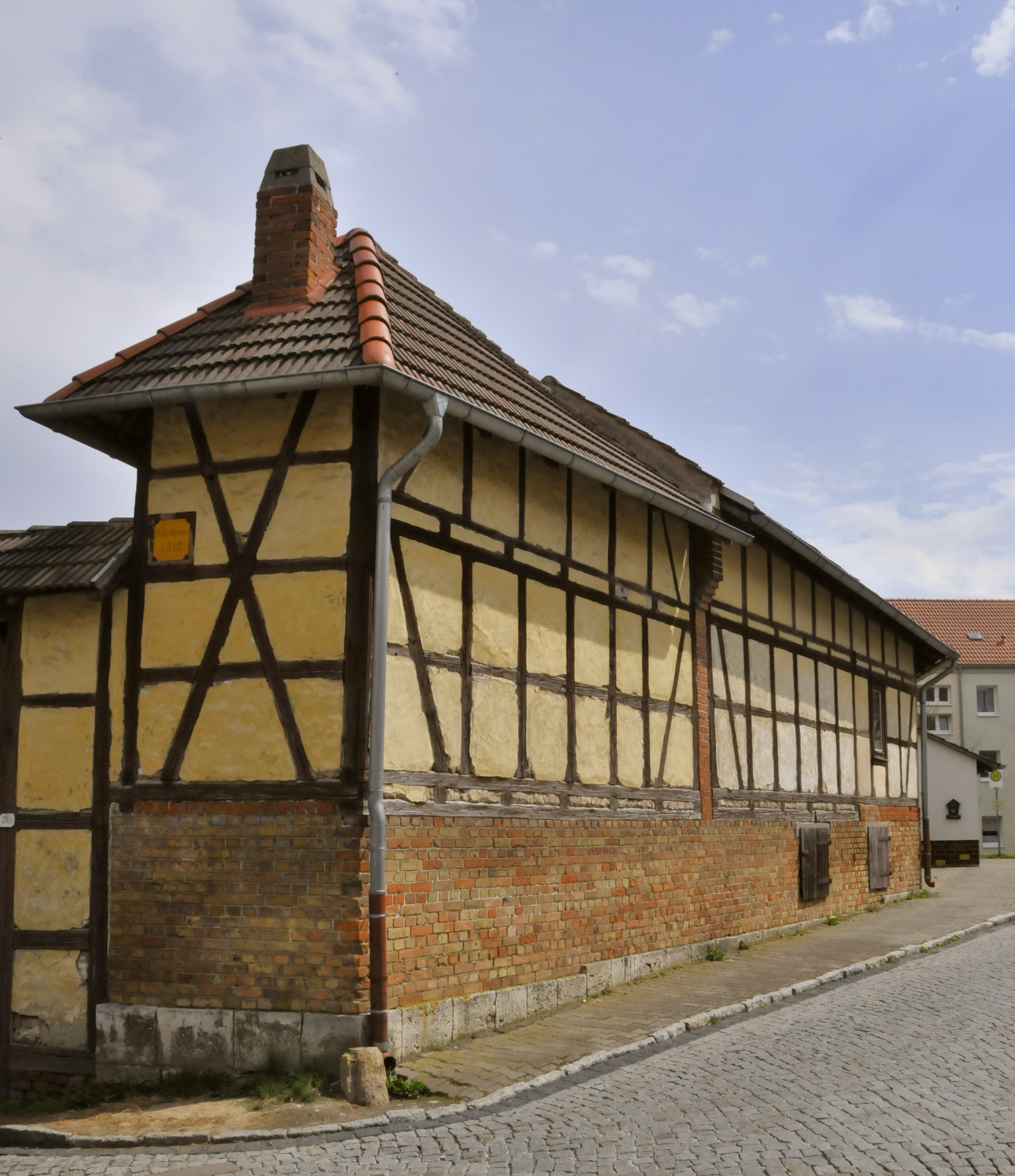
Altes Backhaus

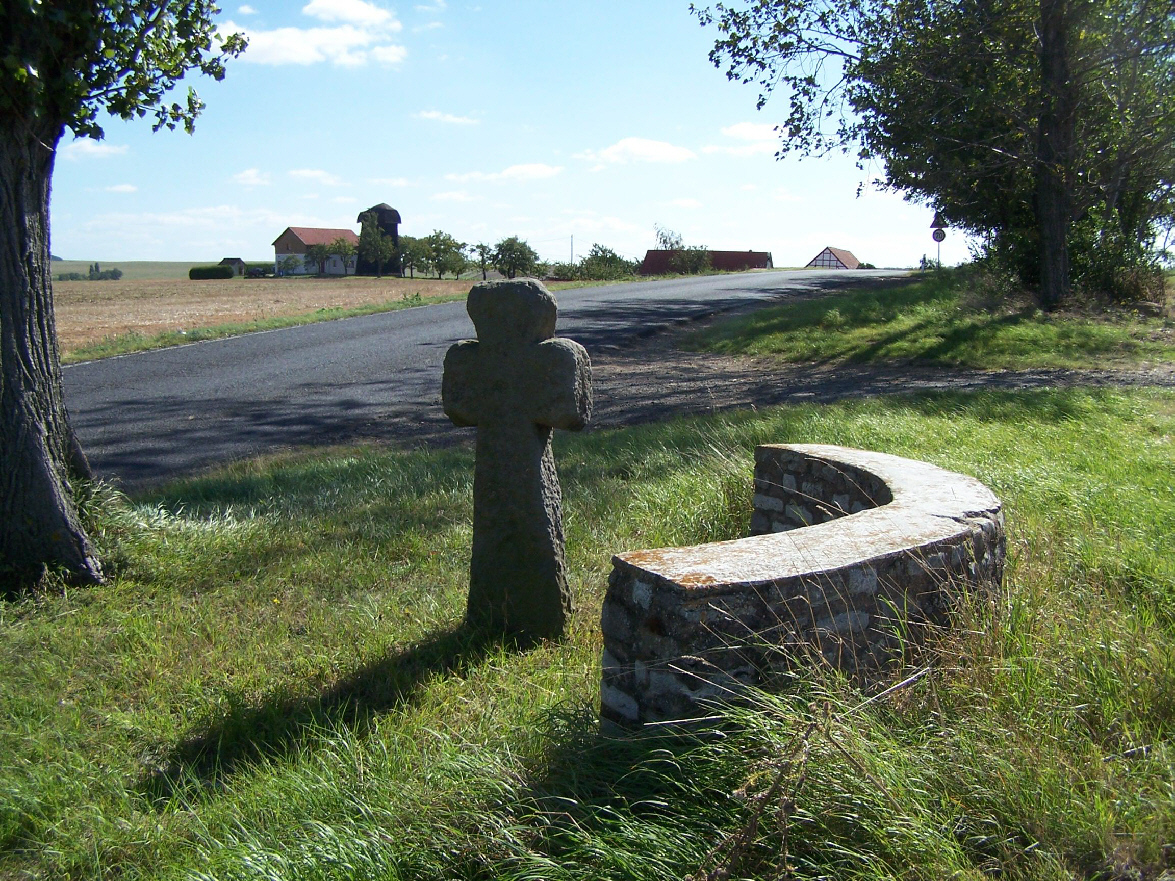
Stone cross and windmill near Aschara

== Economy ==
The economy of the village is agricultural. A few handicraft businesses are also located here. The largest firms are an agricultural machinery company and a vehicle and mechanical engineering company. Aschara is also known for a meat products factory of the same name, which moved to a new industrial park at the outskirts of Bad Langensalza in c. 1985.
