= Battle of Langensalza =

Battle of Langensalza can refer to

- Battle of Langensalza (1075), victory of Henry IV over Saxon nobles
- Battle of Langensalza (1761), an engagement between French forces and allied Prussian and Hanoverian forces during the Seven Years' War
- Battle of Langensalza (1866), overall Prussian victory over the Hanoverian Army.
