= Henningsleben =

- Ortsteil of Bad Langensalza
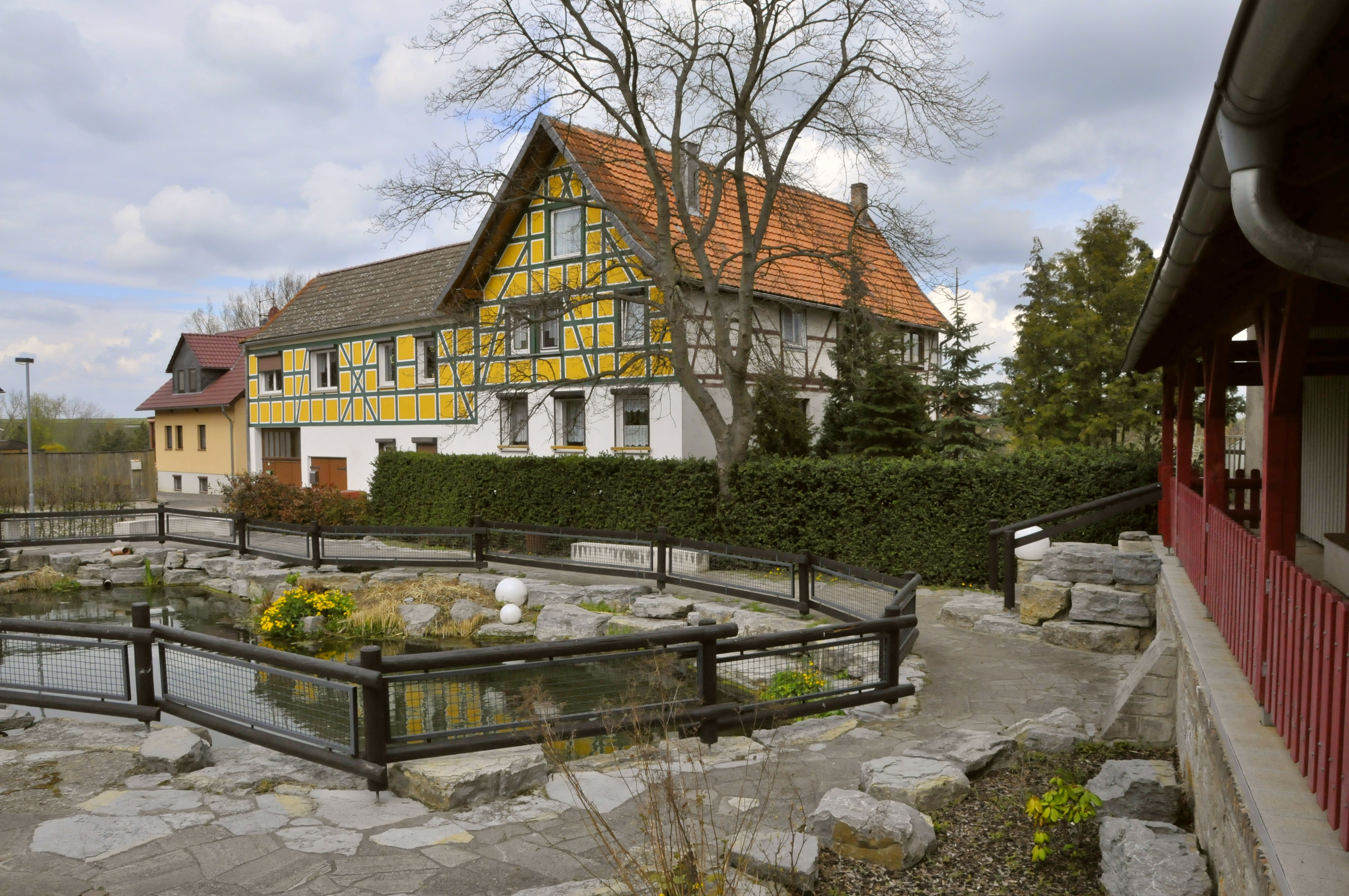
- The village green

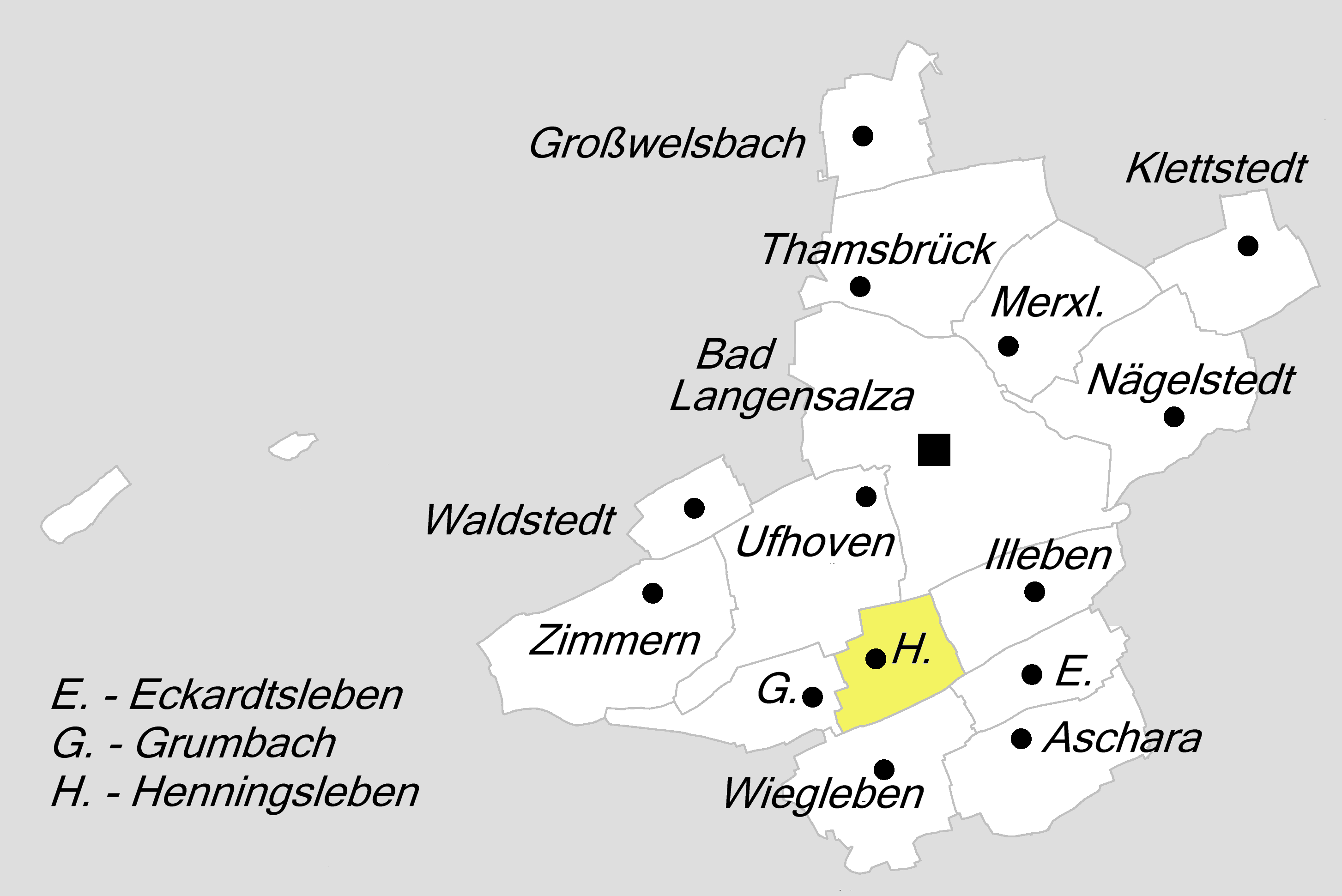
- Location of Henningsleben within Bad Langensalza
- Interactive map of Henningsleben
- Location within Germany Location within Thuringia
- Coordinates: 51°04′10″N 10°38′9″E
- Country: Germany
- State: Thuringia
- District: Unstrut-Hainich-Kreis
- Town: Bad Langensalza
- First mentioned: 1186

Government
  - Mayor: Torsten Schmied

Area
  - Total: 4.69 km^{2} (1.81 sq mi)
- Elevation: 262 m (860 ft)

Population (2020-12-31)
  - Total: 228
  - Density: 48.6/km^{2} (126/sq mi)
- Time zone: UTC+01:00 (CET)
  - Summer (DST): UTC+02:00 (CEST)
- Postal codes: 99947
- Dialling codes: 03603
- Website: badlangensalza.de

Henningsleben (pronounced [ˈhɛnɪŋgsˌleːbn̩]) is a village and an Ortsteil (part) of the town of Bad Langensalza in Thuringia, central Germany, with about 230 inhabitants.

== Geography ==
Henningsleben is situated c. 4.5 kilometres (2.8 mi) south of Bad Langensalza, 15 kilometres (9.3 mi) north of the old part of Gotha and about 29 kilometres (18 mi) (beeline) northwest of Erfurt. Together with the neighbouring Grumbach, the village is situated on the eastern slope of the Große Harth on a deeply cut stream, which is fed by two springs in the Grumbach area and is reinforced east of Henningsleben by the outflow of the Katzenborn. The stream, now called Herzbach, flows eastwards in the valley to Illeben. South of Nägelstedt, the stream flows into the Tonna, 550 metres (1,800 ft) before its confluence with the Unstrut. The highest elevation near the village is the Roter Berg to the north.

The Bundesstraße (federal highway) B 247 between Gotha and Bad Langensalza runs along the eastern edge of the village. The paved field path Illeber Weg leads from the B 247 straight northeast to Illeben, about 3 kilometres (1.9 mi) away. From the same point, the Landesstraße (state road) L 2125 (formerly Kreisstraße 103) runs through the village as the main village road; on the one hand, to leave it to the south in the direction of Wiegleben, and on the other hand, now again as K 103 and as a dead-end road, to lead to Grumbach.

== History ==
The village was first mentioned in a document in 1186.

Until 1815, Henningsleben belonged to the Amt (district of) Langensalza in the Electorate of Saxony and, after its cession to Prussia, to the Landkreis (district of) Langensalza in the Province of Saxony from 1816 to 1944. Henningsleben played an important role in the Battle of Langensalza against the Prussians in 1866. Until 1945, the Richter family of landowners lived in Henningsleben. Their manor house was demolished in 1947 and the material obtained was used to build settlement houses for the German Expellees. In 1952, the second Landwirtschaftliche Produktionsgenossenschaft ("Agricultural Production Cooperative") in the then GDR (after the one in Merxleben) was founded in Henningsleben.

Henningsleben was incorporated into Bad Langensalza on 1 April 1993.

== Culture and sights ==
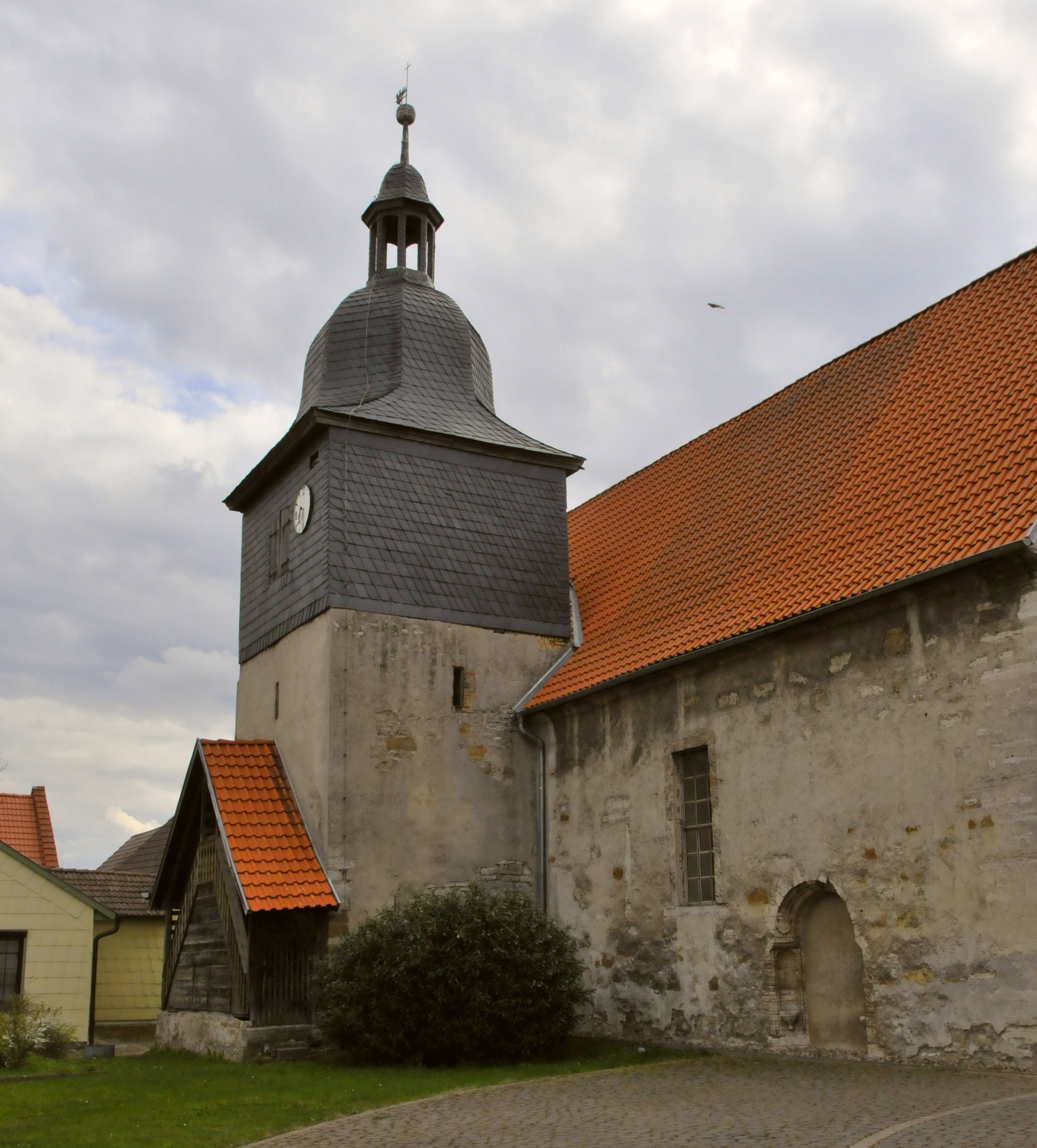
St Mary's Church

St Mary's Church (German: St. Mariä) in Henningsleben was built in 1730. 22 pictures in need of restoration adorn the parapet of the three-sided gallery. A flat coffered ceiling spans the nave.
