= Zimmern, Bad Langensalza =

Zimmern
- Ortsteil of Bad Langensalza
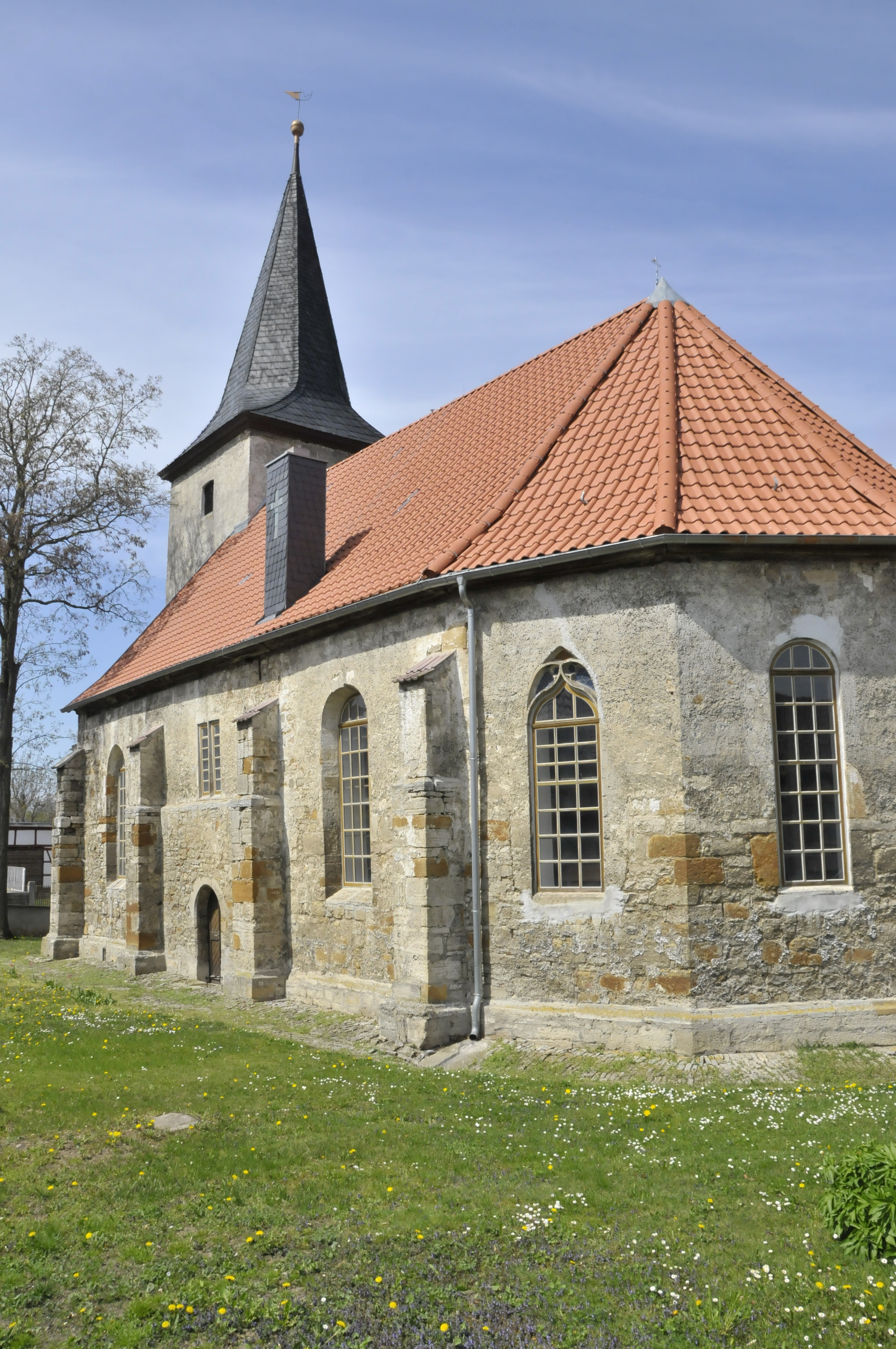
- St Martin's Church

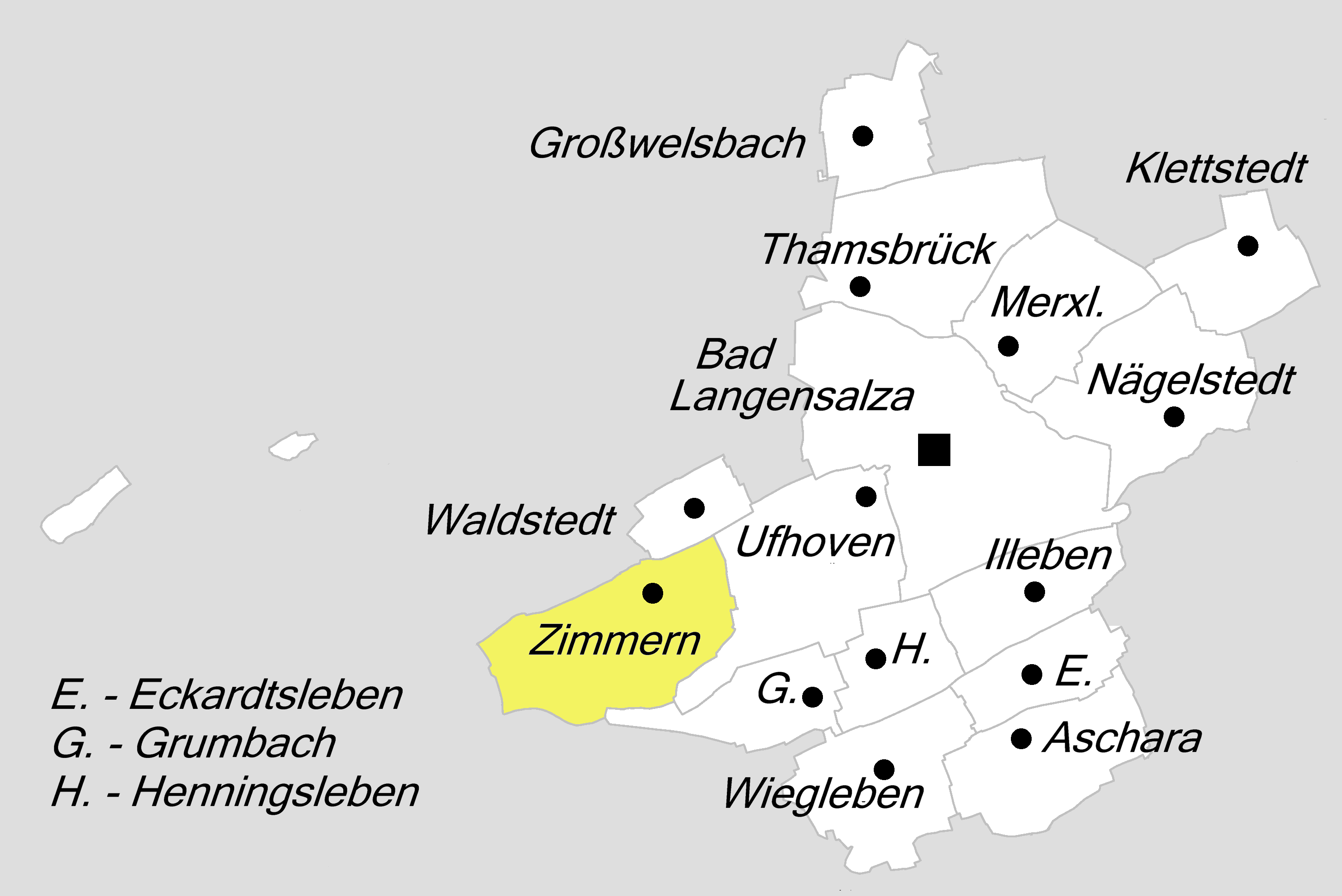
- Location of Zimmern within Bad Langensalza
- Interactive map of Zimmern
- Location within Germany Location within Thuringia
- Coordinates: 51°05′11.4″N 10°34′30.72″E
- Country: Germany
- State: Thuringia
- District: Unstrut-Hainich-Kreis
- Town: Bad Langensalza
- First mentioned: 775

Government
  - Mayor: Marlene Ruft

Area
  - Total: 11.77 km^{2} (4.54 sq mi)
- Elevation: 226 m (741 ft)

Population (2020-12-31)
  - Total: 308
  - Density: 26.2/km^{2} (67.8/sq mi)
- Time zone: UTC+01:00 (CET)
  - Summer (DST): UTC+02:00 (CEST)
- Postal codes: 99947
- Dialling codes: 03603
- Website: badlangensalza.de

Zimmern (German pronunciation: [ˈtsɪmɐn]) is a village and a quarter of the town of Bad Langensalza in Thuringia, central Germany.

== Geography ==
Zimmern is located southwest of Bad Langensalza on the Landesstraße (state's road) L 1042, which connects the village with Alterstedt in the northwest and Ufhoven in the northeast. The village is located 1.66 kilometres (1.03 mi) northeast of the Hainich National Park, which occupies 450 hectares (1.7 mi^{2}) of the village's territory. The rest of the quarter belongs to the arable farming area near Bad Langensalza with its location on the edge of the Thuringian Basin. The village has several streams that flow into the Salza through vegetated erosion channels: The Zimmertalsgraben rises on the edge of the Hainich and joins the Orbach in the centre of the village. From here on it is called Zimmerbach. Further south, but also on the edge of the National Park, the Hellerbach rises with several of its headwaters. About 800 metres (2,600 ft) before the bridge of the Bad Langensalza bypass (Bundesstraße 247), the Zimmerbach and the Hellerbach join and a few metres further, they join the source stream of the Salza.

The neighbouring villages are: Waldstedt to the north (1.38 km (0.86 mi)), Ufhoven to the north-east (4.00 km (2.49 mi)), Grumbach to the south-east (3.51 km (2.18 mi)), Craula to the south-west (6.34 km (3.94 mi)) and Alterstedt to the north-west (1.99 km (1.24 mi)).

== History ==
Zimmern was first mentioned in a document in 775 AD.

St Martin's Church was consecrated in 1700. Until 1815, the village belonged to the Electorate of Saxony's district of Langensalza and after its cession to Prussia, from 1816 to 1944, it was part of the district of Langensalza in the province of Saxony.

After the founding of the German Democratic Republic, agriculture in the village was forcibly collectivised. Today there is an equestrian farm in the village.

Zimmern was incorporated into Bad Langensalza on 1 January 1994. At the end of 2015, 330 inhabitants were registered in the village.

== Notable people ==
- Jeremias Spiegel (1589–1637), Lutheran theologian and rhetorician
- Hans Rumpf (1888–1965), fire engineer and fire inspector as well as SS brigade leader and police major general
