= Zimmern =

Zimmern may refer to:

== Places in Germany ==
- Zimmern, Bad Langensalza, in the Unstrut-Hainich district, Thuringia
- Zimmern, Saale-Holzland-Kreis, in the Saale-Holzland district, Thuringia
- Zimmern ob Rottweil, in Baden-Württemberg
- Zimmern unter der Burg, in Baden-Württemberg
- Groß-Zimmern, in Hesse

== People with the surname ==
- Von Zimmern, Swabian family of barons/counts
- Alice Zimmern (1855–1939), English writer, translator and suffragist
- Alfred Eckhard Zimmern (1879–1957), British classical scholar and historian
- Andrew Zimmern (born 1961), American food writer, dining critic, radio talk show host, TV personality and chef
- George Samuel Zimmern (1904–1979), Hong Kong social activist and educator
- Heinrich Zimmern (1862–1931), German Assyriologist
- Helen Zimmern (1846–1934), German-British writer and translator
- Katharina von Zimmern (1478-1547), last abbess of Fraumünster Abbey

== Fictional ==
- Luke Zimmern was a fictional German economist and social scientist whose name appears in The Shape of Things to Come by H. G. Wells
