= Klettstedt =

- Ortsteil of Bad Langensalza
- Interactive map of Klettstedt
- Location within Germany Location within Thuringia
- Coordinates: 51°8′N 10°45′E
- Country: Germany
- State: Thuringia
- District: Unstrut-Hainich-Kreis
- Town: Bad Langensalza

Area
  - Total: 5.7 km^{2} (2.2 sq mi)
- Elevation: 220 m (720 ft)

Population (2017-12-31)
  - Total: 218
  - Density: 38/km^{2} (99/sq mi)
- Time zone: UTC+01:00 (CET)
  - Summer (DST): UTC+02:00 (CEST)
- Postal codes: 99955
- Dialling codes: 036041

Klettstedt (German pronunciation: [ˈklɛtˌʃtɛt]) is a village and a former municipality in the Unstrut-Hainich-Kreis district of Thuringia, Germany. Since 1 January 2019, it is part of the town Bad Langensalza.
