= Tonna (Unstrut) =

Stream in Thuringia, Germany

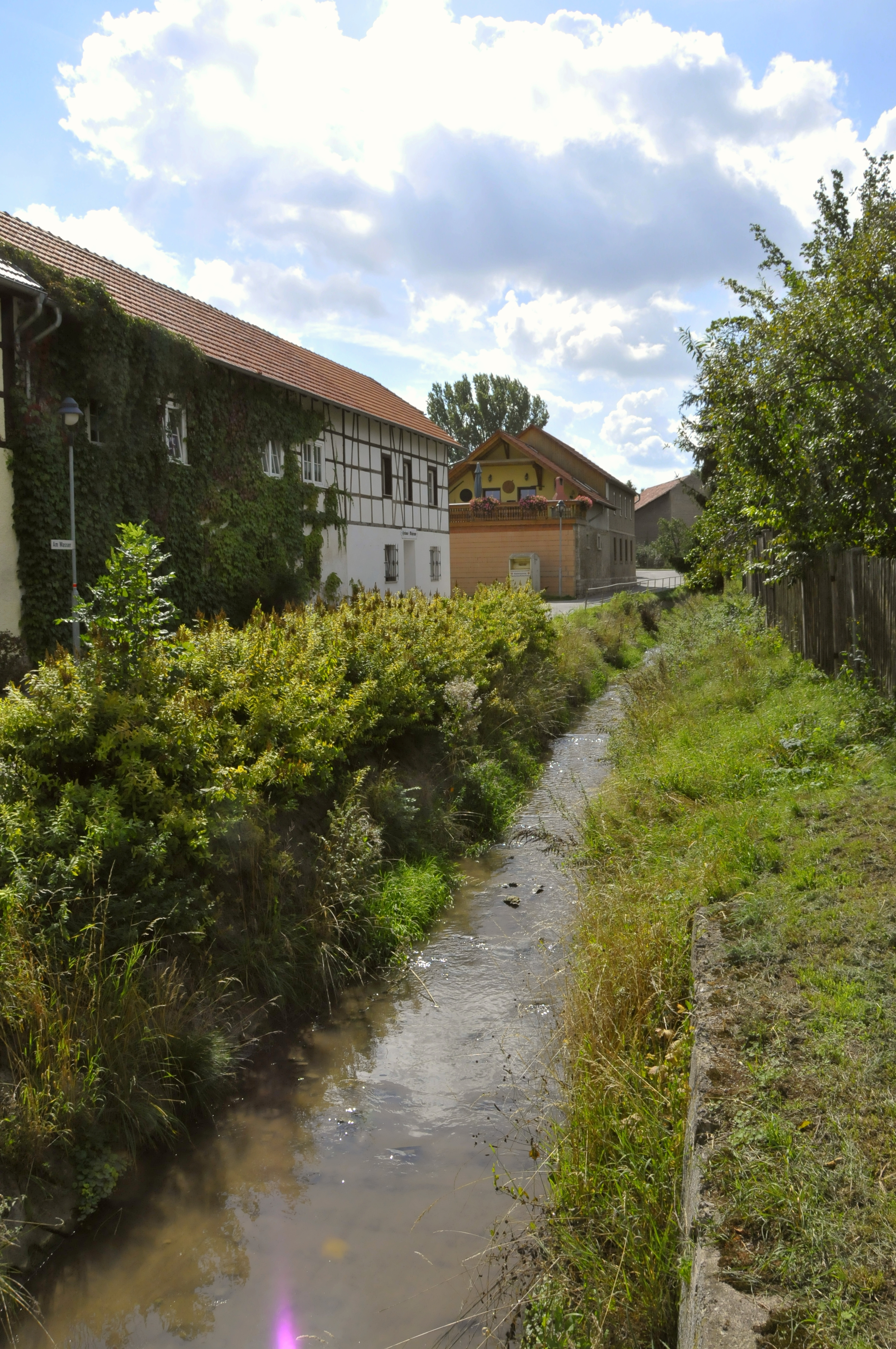
- Tonna in Burgtonna

Location
- Country: Germany
- State: Thuringia

Physical characteristics
- Source: near Ballstädt
  - elevation: 337 m (1,106 ft)
- Mouth: Unstrut
  - coordinates: 51.1069°N 10.7172°E
  - elevation: 161.1 m (529 ft)
- Length: 10 km (6.2 mi)

Basin features
- Progression: Unstrut→ Saale→ Elbe→ North Sea
- River system: Elbe

The Tonna is a stream in the Thuringian Basin, Germany.

The Tonna rises on the southern outskirts of Ballstädt in the district of Gotha and flows on the western edge of the Fahner Höhe in a northern direction through the municipality of Tonna for around 10 kilometres (6 mi), after which it flows into the Unstrut river near the Bad Langensalza quarter of Nägelstedt.

== See also ==
- List of rivers of Thuringia
