= Battle of Langensalza (1761) =

1761 battle

Coordinates: 51.1080°N 10.6468°E

- Part of the Seven Years' War
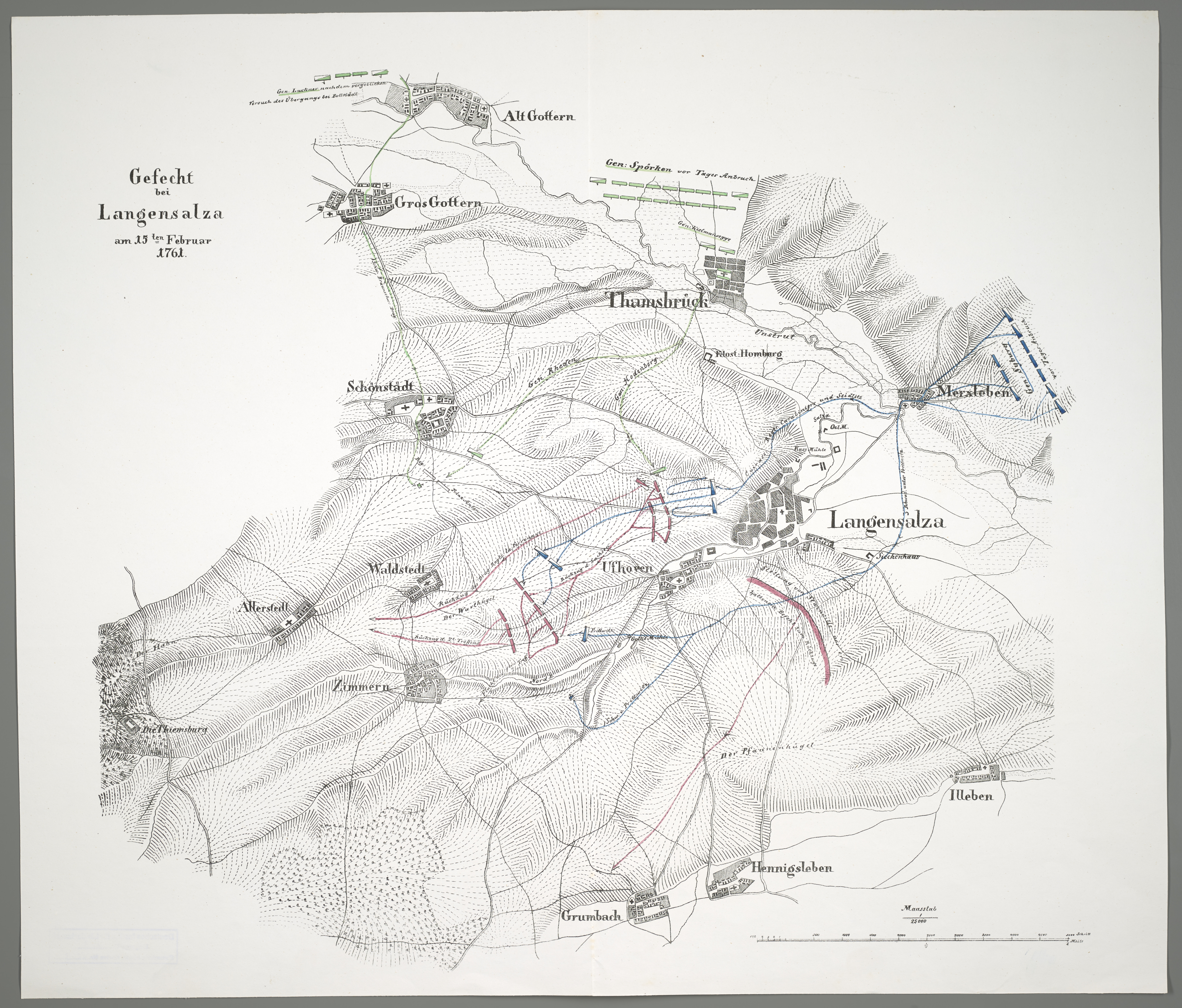
- German map of the battle (19th century)
Date	15 February 1761
Location	Langensalza, Germany
Result	Prussian–Hanoverian victory

Belligerents
Prussia; Hanover	France; Saxony

Commanders and leaders
(Kingdom of Prussia) Friedrich Wilhelm von Syburg (Province of Hanover) Friedrich von Spörcken	(Kingdom of France) Jacques Philippe de Choiseul-Stainville (Electorate of Saxony) Friedrich Christoph zu Solms-Wildenfels

The Battle of Langensalza (10 February 1761) was an engagement between French forces and allied Prussian and Hanoverian forces during the Seven Years' War. It was fought near Langensalza in what is now eastern Germany.

== Prelude ==
After the difficult campaign of 1760, the Austrians and Russians had to interrupt their operations against the Prussians with the onset of winter. Frederick II then asked his Anglo-Hanoverian allies, commanded by Ferdinand of Brunswick-Lüneburg, to resume the offensive against the French and Saxons in Hesse in the middle of winter, and sent a corps of 7,000 Prussian soldiers to support them.

== The Battle ==
The Hanoverians under Von Spörcken approached the enemy from Duderstadt via Worbis and Dingelstädt, preventing the French Lieutenant-General Saint-Pern at Eschwege, from joining forces with the troops on the Unstrut River.
At the same time, a Prussian corps under Major General Syburg marched from Weißenfels toward Langensalza.
Von Spörcken doubled back to the left bank of the Unstrut above Mühlhausen, which was occupied by 5,000 French troops, and also marched toward Langensalza. In the early morning of 15 February, the combined allies were north of Langensalza, Von Spörcken near Thamsbrück and Sydow near Merxleben. However, due to the onset of a thaw, crossing the Unstrut proved difficult.

The French and Saxons, who were on the heights southeast of Langensalza, were also separated by the flooded Salza River. Perhaps decisive in the battle was that the French under command of Choiseul-Stainville received orders from their commander-in-chief, Marshal Broglie, to retreat to the Werra River, barely after the engagement had begun. Saint-Pern had already obeyed the same order. Unfortunately, the 3,000 Saxons only received Broglie's order when they were already in the middle of the fight and had to bear its burden alone.

When they attempted to retreat, the Saxon infantry were attacked in the flanks by the enemy cavalry and partially overrun. By 10 a.m. the battle was decided: five Saxon regiments or battalions with about 2,000 men were taken prisoner. The Saxons also lost 13 cannons and 7 flags and standards to the enemy.

== Aftermath ==
The Prussians occupied Langensalza, while the Hanoverians resumed their original position on the left bank of the Unstrut. The remaining Saxons withdrew to Eisenach and joined the main French contingent there. Over the next few weeks, the French and Saxons abandoned large parts of Hesse and retreated as far as Hanau. Prince Ferdinand, however, renounced further pursuit, giving the French the opportunity to regroup.

The defeat caused additional controversy in France because the French commander on the ground, Lieutenant-General Jacques Philippe de Choiseul-Stainville, was the brother of War Minister Étienne de Choiseul-Stainville. He was blamed for his premature withdrawal from the battlefield, even though he had been ordered to do so.
