= Ufhoven =

- Ortsteil of Bad Langensalza
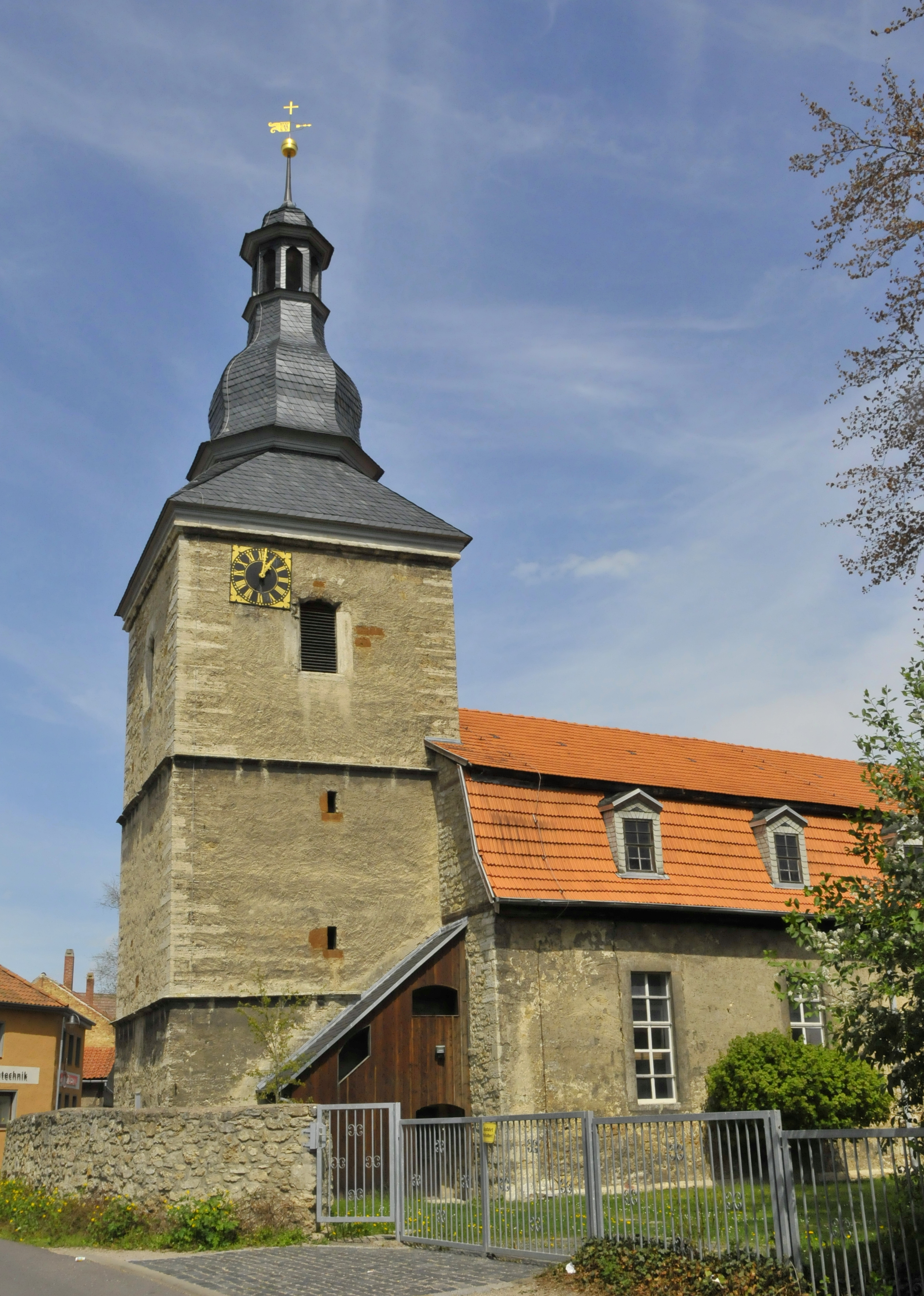
- Saint Wipert's Church

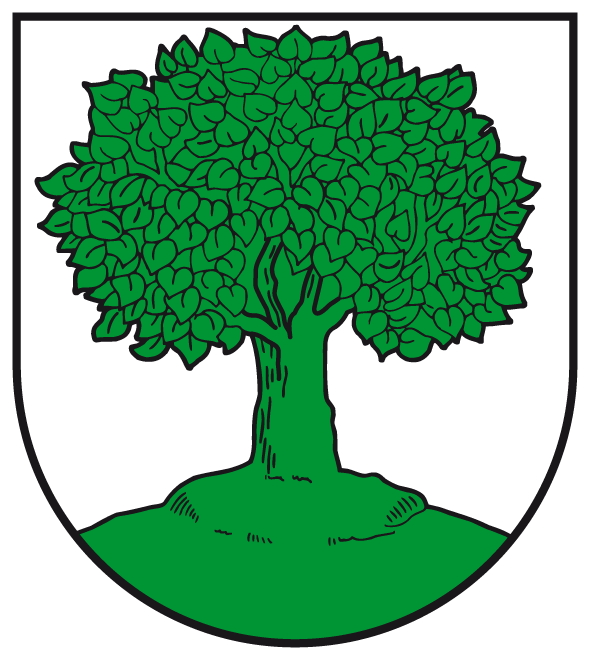
- Coat of arms

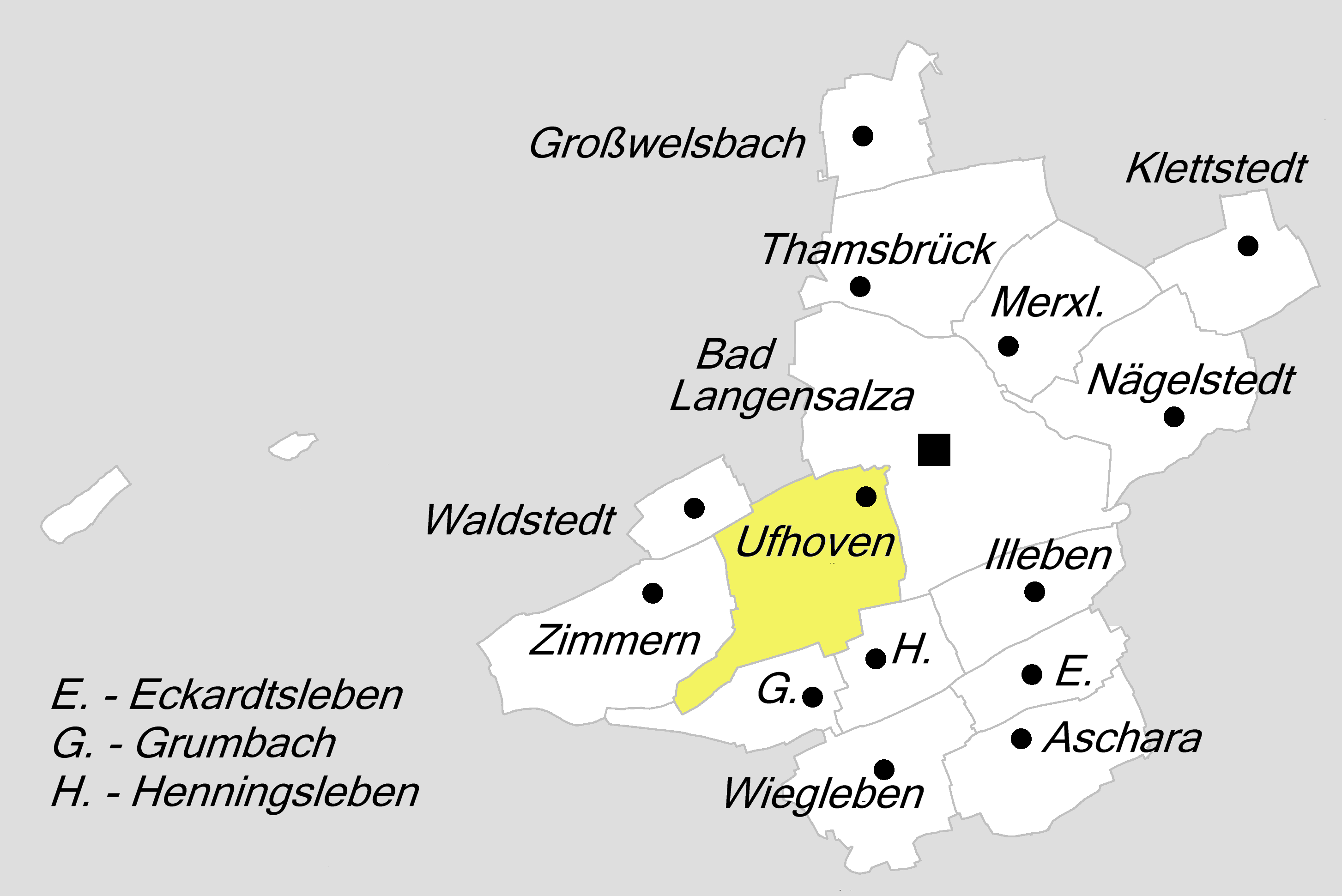
- Location of Ufhoven within Bad Langensalza
- Interactive map of Ufhoven
- Location within Germany Location within Thuringia
- Coordinates: 51°06′2.16″N 10°37′44.039″E
- Country: Germany
- State: Thuringia
- District: Unstrut-Hainich-Kreis
- Town: Bad Langensalza
- First mentioned: 1047–1050

Government
  - Mayor: Uwe Domni
- Elevation: 200 m (660 ft)

Population (2020-12-31)
  - Total: 1,545
- Time zone: UTC+01:00 (CET)
  - Summer (DST): UTC+02:00 (CEST)
- Postal codes: 99947
- Dialling codes: 03603
- Website: badlangensalza.de

Ufhoven (pronounced [ˈuːfhoːfn̩]) is a quarter of the town of Bad Langensalza in Thuringia, central Germany.

== Location ==
Ufhoven is located directly southwest of the core town of Bad Langensalza and is tangent to the Bundesstraßen (federal highways) B 84 and B 247. Two branches of the Salza, a tributary of the Unstrut, flow through the village.

== History ==
According to the document book of the town and the former district of Langensalza, the first mention of the village of Ufhoven dates from around 1047–1050.

Ufhoven Castle, of which only a few wall remains can be seen today, was located in the village itself and was the third of the fortifications of the town of Langensalza of Dryburg, which consisted of three castles. The Lords of Salza had built Dribogk Castle as their seat and bought the "Ufhoufe" (according to the Düringische Chronik). In 1212, Emperor Otto IV laid siege to the Dryburg of the Lords of Salza in a dispute with the Thuringian Landgrave Hermann I. The Lords of Salza surrendered and Gunther of Salza was allowed to keep Ufhoven Castle. He also received the villages of Döllstädt and Ufhoven. Until 1815, the village belonged to the Electorate of Langensalza, and after it was ceded to Prussia, from 1816 to 1944 it belonged to the district of Langensalza in the province of Saxony.

The merging of the municipality of Ufhoven with the town of Langensalza was decided by the Ufhoven municipal council on 16 May 1950. 10 of the 14 valid votes were "yes" from the SED and the CDU, 4 votes were "no" from the LDP. The incorporation took place on 1 July 1950.

== Politics ==
=== Village council and mayor ===
The Bad Langensalza town council decided in February 2019 that Ufhoven should officially become a quarter of Bad Langensalza and have its own village council and mayor. Uwe Domni was elected mayor.

=== Coat of arms ===
The municipal coat of arms was designed by the Magdeburg state archivist Otto Korn. It was awarded by the Chief President of the Province of Saxony on 22 October 1937. The coat of arms depicts the 400-year-old lime tree on the Sülzenberg hill, which is under nature protection. It has been the landmark of the village since time immemorial and was also used as a seal image in the seal of the village.

== Culture and sights ==
- The protected lime tree on the Sülzenberg hill is about 400 years old. It has been the landmark of the village since time immemorial. It was also in the previous coat of arms and seal.
- In the years around 1935 to 1945, the community was officially referred to as a "rose village". After the incorporation, Langensalza took over this tradition from Ufhoven. The rose garden is not in Ufhoven, but in the spa gardens of the town of Bad Langensalza, Vor dem Klagetor. There you can visit the rose garden and rose museum integrated into the spa gardens.
- Ufhoven itself is home to a rose farm that cultivates several rose fields on the slopes north of the village and supplies Bad Langensalza with plants. Thus Ufhoven can (unofficially) continue to call itself a "rose village". For this reason, and also as a reminder of its official status, there have been decorated wooden signs with the word Rosendorf ("Rose Village") at the entrances to the village since 2007.
- In the south-west of the village is the Golke karst spring, which is under nature protection and forms the source of the Salza stream.

== Notable people ==
- Melchior Christian Käpler (1712–1793), forester and poet
- Theodor Ludwig Karl Krieghoff (1879–1946), musician and composer
- Hans Bauer (born 1941), author and former public prosecutor and deputy prosecutor general in the GDR
