= Eckardtsleben =

- Ortsteil of Bad Langensalza
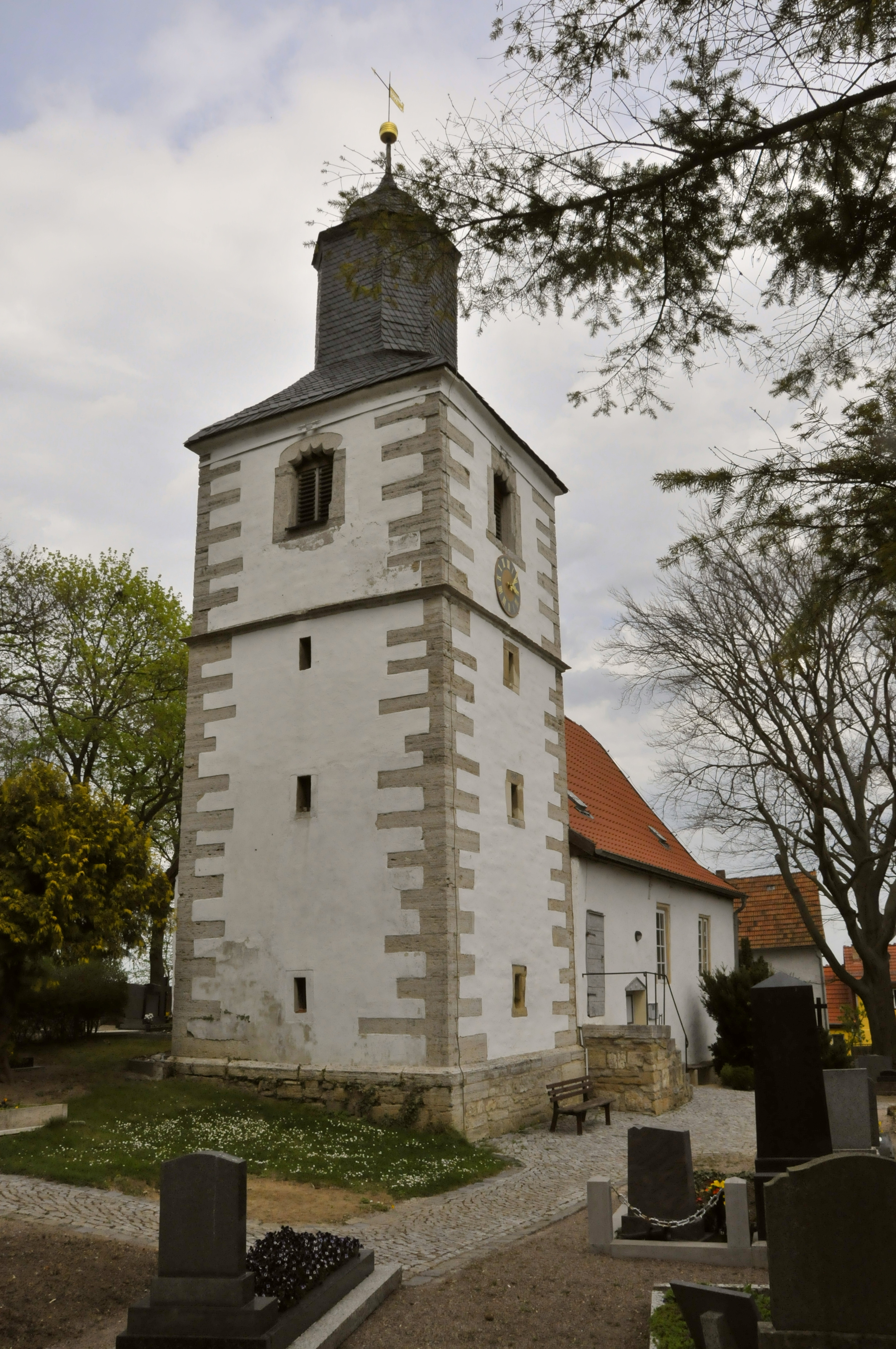
- St Vitus' Church

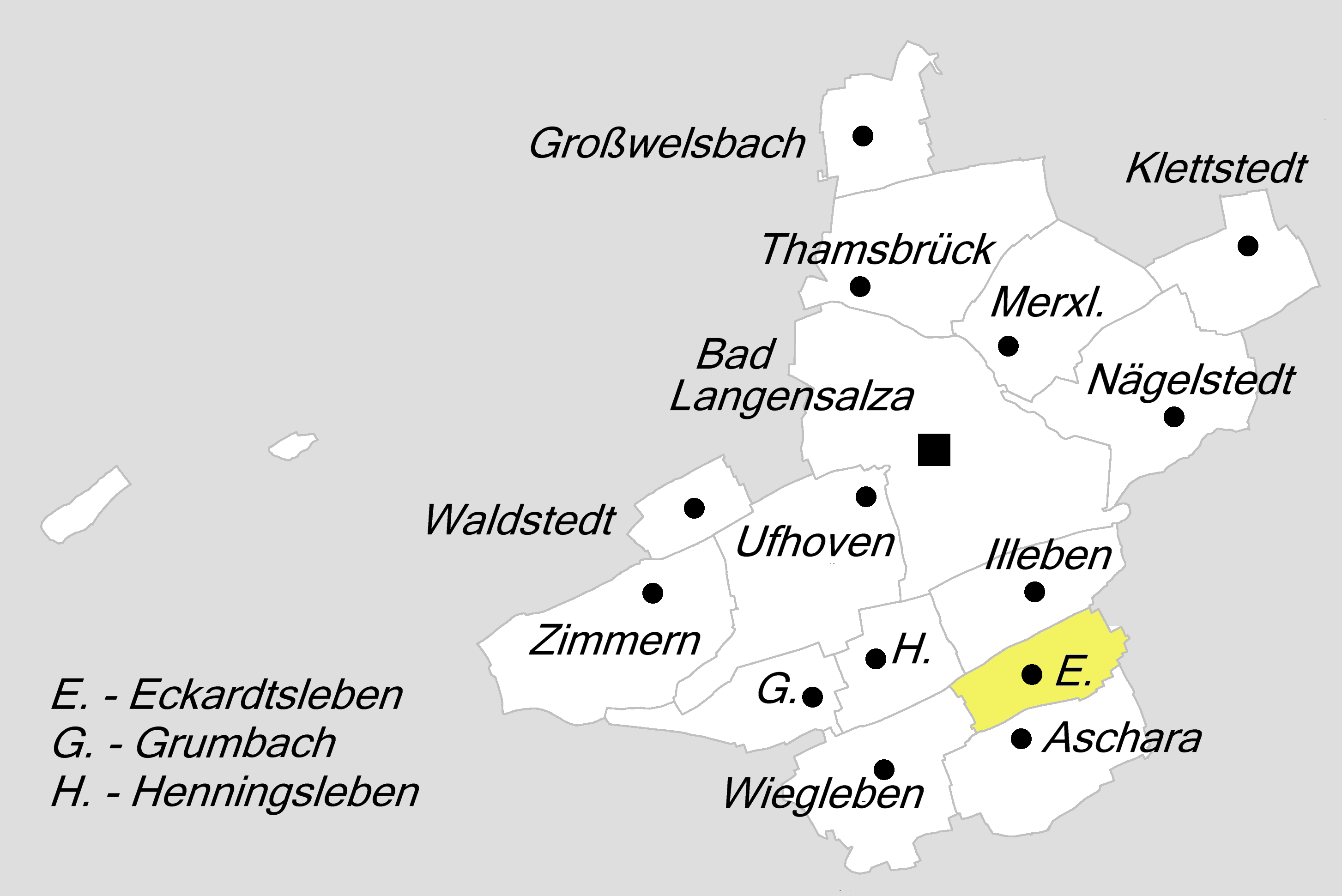
- Location of Eckardtsleben within Bad Langensalza
- Interactive map of Eckardtsleben
- Location within Germany Location within Thuringia
- Coordinates: 51°4′13″N 10°40′51″E
- Country: Germany
- State: Thuringia
- District: Unstrut-Hainich-Kreis
- Town: Bad Langensalza
- First mentioned: 932

Government
  - Mayor: Dirk Schmidt

Area
  - Total: 4.66 km^{2} (1.80 sq mi)
- Elevation: 243 m (797 ft)

Population (2020-12-31)
  - Total: 195
  - Density: 41.8/km^{2} (108/sq mi)
- Time zone: UTC+01:00 (CET)
  - Summer (DST): UTC+02:00 (CEST)
- Postal codes: 99947
- Dialling codes: 03603
- Website: badlangensalza.de

Eckardtsleben (pronounced [ˈɛkaʁtsleːbn̩]) is a village and part of the town of Bad Langensalza in Thuringia, central Germany, with about 200 inhabitants.

== Geography ==
Eckardtsleben is located 4.85 kilometres (3.01 mi) (linear distance) south of Bad Langensalza (Market Church) and on the Landesstraße (state road) 2125 (Bad Langensalza–Aschara). The village lies on both sides of a stream valley sloping down to the north-east. The Schwarzer Bach ("Black Brook"), which rises near Wiegleben, flows through the village from west to east and leaves the village as the Reifenheimer Graben ("Reifenheim Ditch") to flow into the Tonna a little below the Gräfentonna village mill. Since its source, the stream has travelled 8.86 kilometres (5.51 mi) and lost 140 metres (460 ft) in height. The intensively used flat-wavy terrain belongs to the arable farming area of the Thuringian Basin. The soils are fertile and mostly influenced by groundwater. Small erosion gullies, mostly vegetated, break up the landscape.

The Eckardtsleben stop on the Gotha–Leinefelde railway line is located to the south of the village.

== History ==
Eckardtsleben was first mentioned in a document on 1 June 932. The village belonged to the sub-county of the Tonna dominion, which from 1677 belonged to the Duchy of Saxon-Gotha-Altenburg as the "Amt Tonna".

The village has a rural character without multi-storey high-rise and new buildings and is characterised by agriculture.

== Sights ==
St Vitus' Church was built in 1404. Today, it is a Lutheran daughter church. The organ with one manual, one pedal and 8 stops was built by Gustav Koch.
