= Bad Langensalza =

- Town
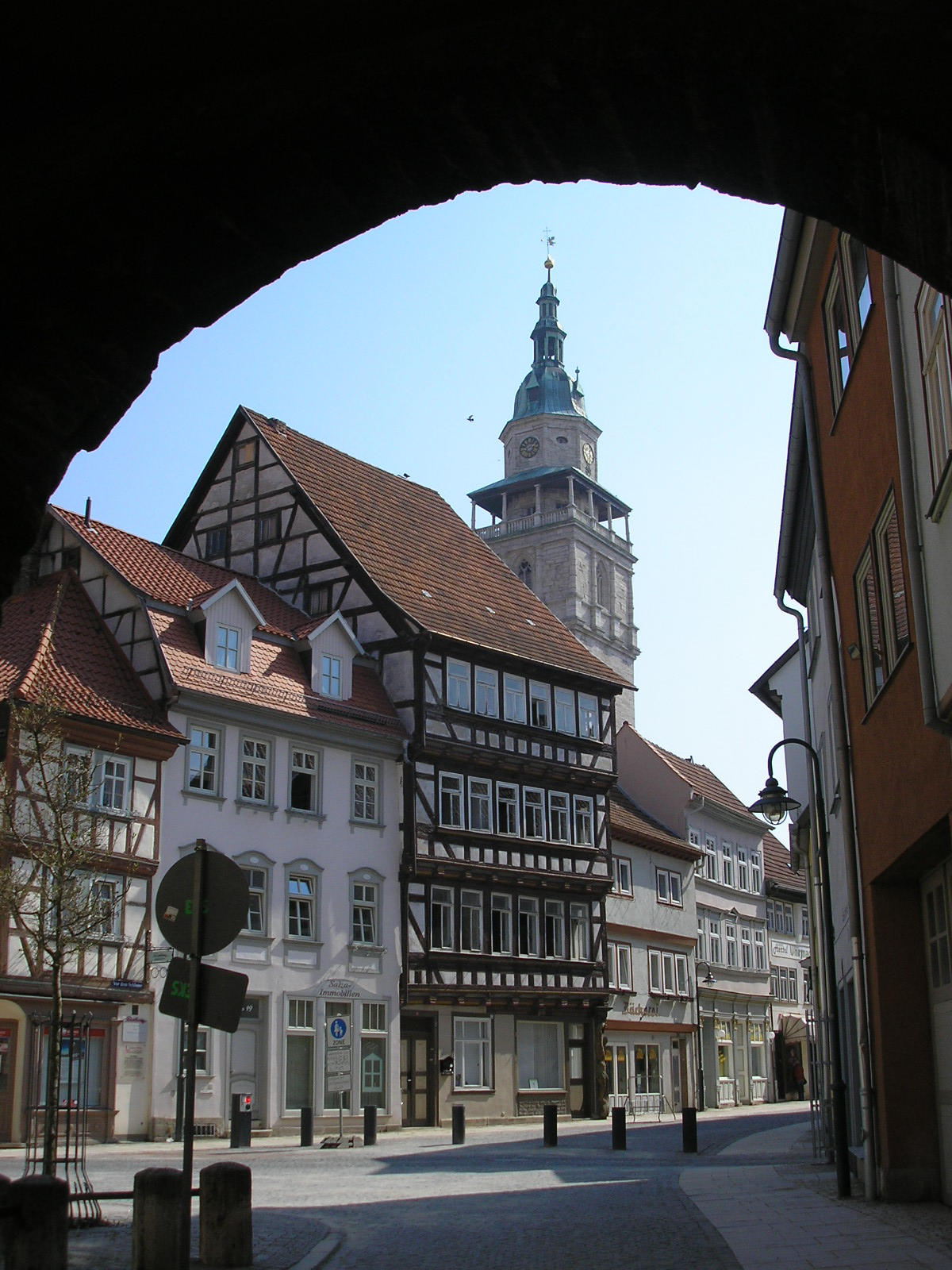
- The historical centre of Bad Langensalza

- Coat of arms

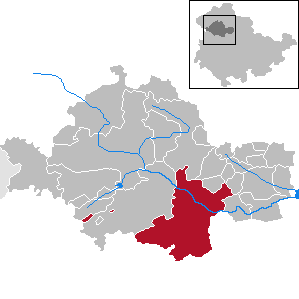
- Location of Bad Langensalza within Unstrut-Hainich-Kreis district
- Interactive map of Bad Langensalza
- Location within Germany Location within Thuringia
- Coordinates: 51°6′29″N 10°38′48″E
- Country: Germany
- State: Thuringia
- District: Unstrut-Hainich-Kreis

Government
  - Mayor (2024–30): Matthias Reinz (Ind.)

Area
  - Total: 129.37 km^{2} (49.95 sq mi)
- Elevation: 202 m (663 ft)

Population (2025-12-31)
  - Total: 16,717
  - Density: 129.22/km^{2} (334.67/sq mi)
- Time zone: UTC+01:00 (CET)
  - Summer (DST): UTC+02:00 (CEST)
- Postal codes: 99941–99947
- Dialling codes: 03603
- Vehicle registration: UH, LSZ, MHL
- Website: badlangensalza.de

Bad Langensalza (German pronunciation: [baːt laŋənˈzaltsa]; until 1956: Langensalza) is a spa town of 17,500 inhabitants in the Unstrut-Hainich district, Thuringia, central Germany.

== Geography ==
=== Location ===
Bad Langensalza is located in the Thuringian Basin, the fertile lowlands along the Unstrut river. The river Salza flows through the town and joins the Unstrut about 2 kilometres (1.2 mi) east of the town. Bad Langensalza lies in an unwooded, intensively farmed and largely flat landscape that rises to the west to the Hainich, to the north to the Heilinger Höhen (Heilinger Heights) and to the southeast to the Fahner Höhen (Fahner Heights). Due to this location, the climate in Bad Langensalza is relatively mild and, with annual precipitation of about 500 millimetres (20 in), very dry.

The town itself is divided into the relatively large old town centre, which is bounded by the historical town wall, and several areas of urban expansion dating from 1850 onwards. Initially, the town expanded southwards and south-eastwards towards the railway station. This is also where the first industrial areas were built. This was followed by expansion to the southwest, where the village of Ufhoven is located, which has since been incorporated into the core town. Since 1950, Bad Langensalza has expanded mainly to the north, where several residential and commercial areas have been built. Municipal reforms since the early 1990s have greatly enlarged the administrative urban area, which now stretches from the forests of the Hainich National Park to the eastern side of the Unstrut river.

=== Neighbouring towns ===
Neighbouring towns of Bad Langensalza are Mühlhausen, 20 kilometres (12 mi) northwest, Eisenach, 30 kilometres (19 mi) southwest, Gotha, 20 kilometres (12 mi) south, Erfurt, 30 kilometres (19 mi) southeast, Sömmerda, 35 kilometres (22 mi) east and Sondershausen, 35 kilometres (22 mi) northeast. Neighbouring municipalities are (clockwise, starting in the west): Schönstedt, Unstrut-Hainich, Nottertal-Heilinger Höhen, Kirchheilingen, Sundhausen, Tottleben, Urleben and Großvargula in the Unstrut-Hainich district, Tonna and Nessetal in the Gotha district and Hörselberg-Hainich in the Wartburg district.

=== Administrative division ===
Bad Langensalza is divided into a total of 15 quarters (including the core town):

Quarter	Population (31 Dec. 2020)	Date of incorporation
Core town	11532	
Aschara	440	1994-01-01
Eckardtsleben	195	1992-01-01
Großwelsbach	253	1994-01-01
Grumbach	221	1993-04-01
Henningsleben	228	1993-04-01
Illeben	148	1992-01-01
Klettstedt	206	2019-01-01
Merxleben	431	1994-01-01
Nägelstedt	704	1993-07-01
Thamsbrück	940	1994-01-01
Ufhoven	1545	1950-07-01
Waldstedt	98	1992-07-01
Wiegleben	342	1993-09-01
Zimmern	308	1994-01-01

== History ==
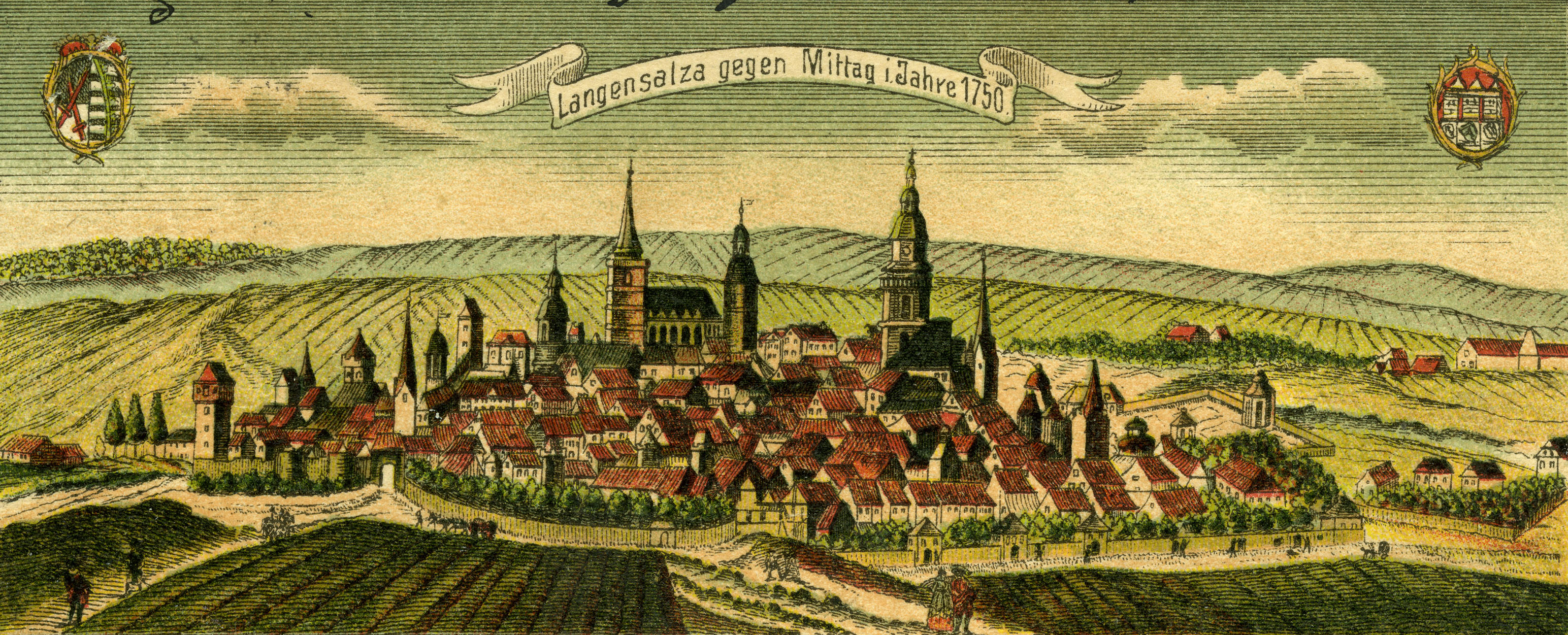
Langensalza in 1750

The town was first mentioned in historical records c. 932, as a village named "Salzaha". The town's name was changed to Langensalza c. 1578, and "Bad" ("Spa") added to the name in 1956.

In 1075, Langensalza was the site of a battle, in which Emperor Henry IV won over the rebelling Saxons and Thuringians.

The town was plundered and damaged by fires during the Thirty Years' War (c. 1632). Fires again destroyed large parts of the town in 1711, including complete destruction of the town hall, which was rebuilt between 1742 and 1752.

War again affected the town between 1756 and 1763, during the Seven Years' War; it was the scene of a battle in February 1761. In 1815 Langensalza became part of the Prussian Province of Saxony.

In 1866 it was again the site of a battle, this time between Prussia and Hanover during the Austro-Prussian War. This Battle of Langensalza is notable for being the last time intra-German forces have met in combat.

During World War I, a German prisoner-of-war camp for Allies, including Americans, was operated in the town.

On April 5, 1945, Langensalza was occupied by American troops and handed over to the Red Army in early July. It became part of the Soviet (Russian) occupation zone and, from 1949 to 1990, was part of the German Democratic Republic.

== Main sights ==
Langensalza is a popular tourist destination, with a well-preserved medieval old town, a number of themed public gardens and a thermal spa bath. In 2011 it won the title "Most blooming town in Europe" as part of the Europe-wide horticultural competition Entente Florale. In 2025 it was listed among "Germany's most beautiful small towns", along with Brüggen in Nordrhein-Westfalen and Rüdesheim in Hessen.

Sulphur springs were discovered in 1811 and opened to the public as a curative bath in 1812. A new version of the public sulphur bath was opened in 1928. Salt and mineral water springs were discovered in 1996, which prompted the opening of many new curative facilities. Today a modern thermal bath attracts many visitors.

Bad Langensalza contains a large Rose Garden, a Botanical Garden, a Magnolia Garden and an Arboretum. Its authentic Japanese Garden is a major tourist attraction. Bad Langensalza is also close to the Hainich National Park, Germany's oldest deciduous forest.

Every August, the town hosts a Middle Ages Festival (Mittelalterstadtfest) where townsfolk don traditional dress and visitors can experience medieval crafts, handwork, martial arts, food and music.

The town is on the German Timber-Frame Road (Fachwerkstraße) and is notable for the number of well-preserved medieval half-timbered (Fachwerk) houses.

Travertine stone has been mined in the town since medieval times, and is still carved there today. It forms the distinctive white stonework of the old town, particularly the Marktkirche, Bergkirche and Rathaus. Travertine from Langensalza was used in the building of Berlin's Brandenburg Gate and in one of the most famous works of modern architecture, the Barcelona Pavilion.

== Cultural ==
The then Augustinian friar Martin Luther visited Langensalza's (still preserved) Augustinian Cloister in 1516 in his role as District Vicar. As a result, the town is now on the Luther Trail. The poet Friedrich Gottlieb Klopstock lived in Langensalza between 1748 and 1750, where he composed some of his most famous works. His sumptuous house is still standing in the Salzstraße. The poet Novalis lived for a time in Langensalza in 1796 whilst studying chemistry under Johann Christian Wiegleb at his house in the Markstraße. Christoph Wilhelm Hufeland, the most eminent German physician of the 19th Century, was born in Langensalza. He is buried in the famous Dorotheenstadt Cemetery in Berlin.

== Twin towns – sister cities ==
Bad Langensalza is twinned with:

- Oostkamp, Belgium
- Bad Nauheim, Germany

== Notable people ==
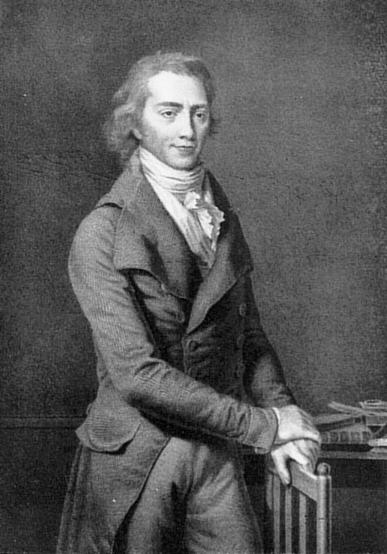
Christoph Wilhelm Hufeland

- Hermann von Salza (around 1170–1239), 4th Master of the Teutonic Order
- Georg Neumark (1621–1681), composer and poet
- Johann Christian Wiegleb (1732–1800), naturalist and pharmacist
- Christoph Wilhelm Hufeland (1762–1836), physician, founder of macrobiotics
- Hermann Bonitz (1814–1888), scholar and educator
- Ernst Keil (1816-1878), bookseller and journalist
- Ulrich Kleemann (1892–1963), general of tank troops in World War II
- Rudolf Batz (1903–1961), Sturmbannführer, leader of Einsatzkommando 2, responsible for the mass murder of Jews in the Baltics
- Dieter Fromm (born 1948), middle-distance runner
- Uwe Barth (born 1964), politician (FDP)
- Radost Bokel (born 1975), actress
- Claudia Schramm (born 1975), bobsledder
- Enrico Kühn (born 1977), bobsledder
- Marco Engelhardt (born 1980), footballer
- Silvio Heinevetter (born 1984), handball player
- Matthias Rahn (born 1990), footballer

== Gallery ==
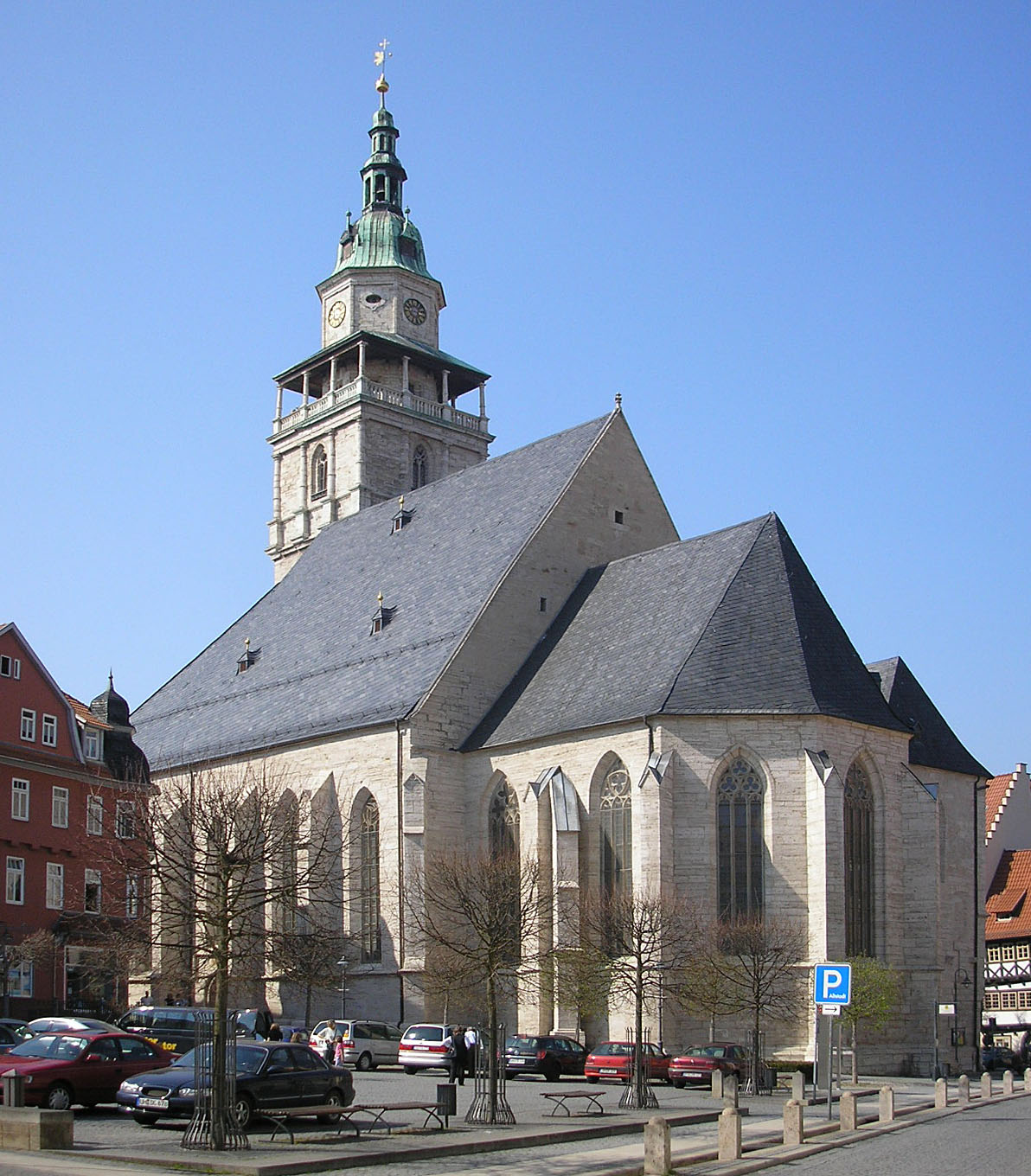
Market Church

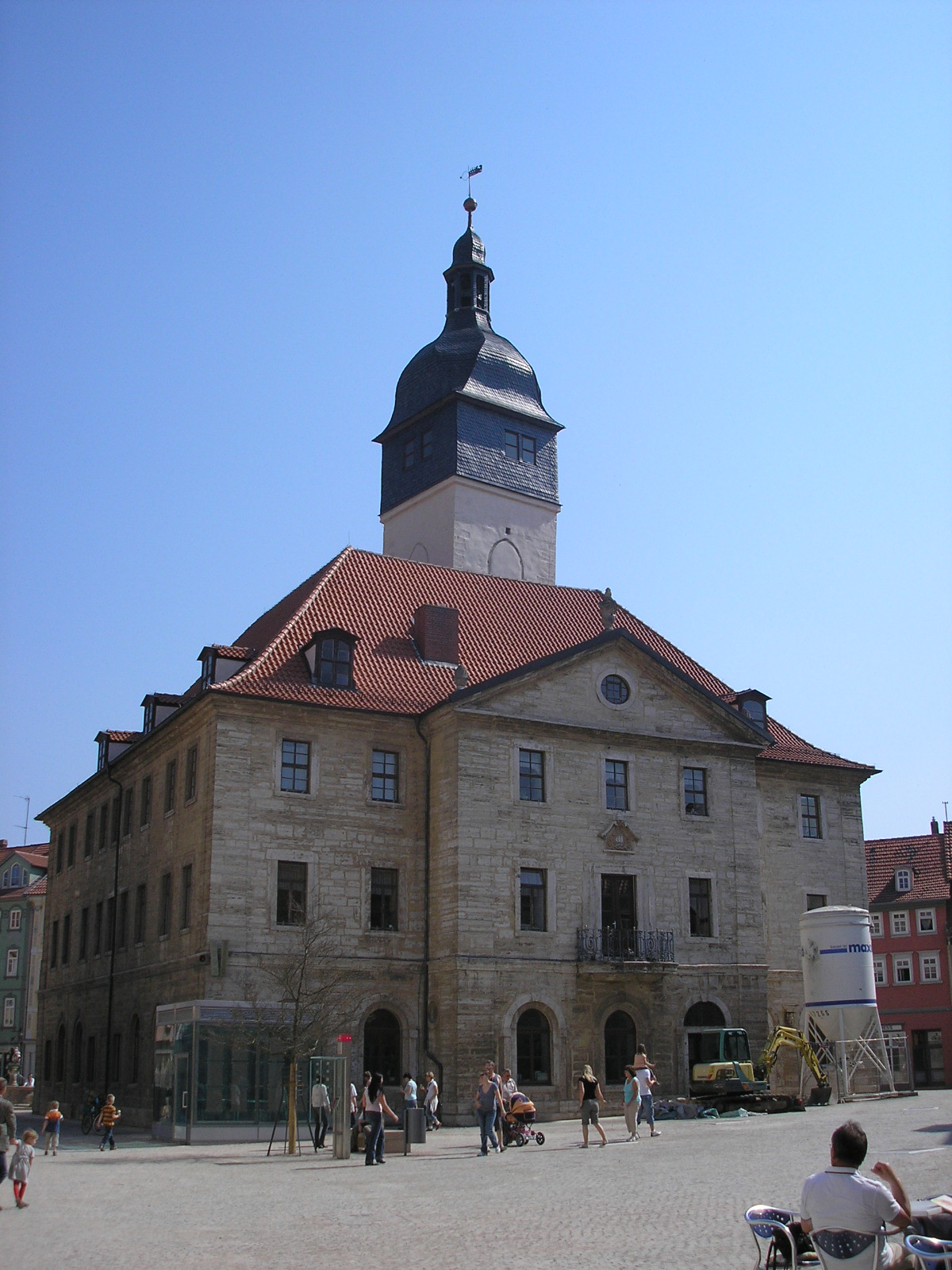
Town Hall

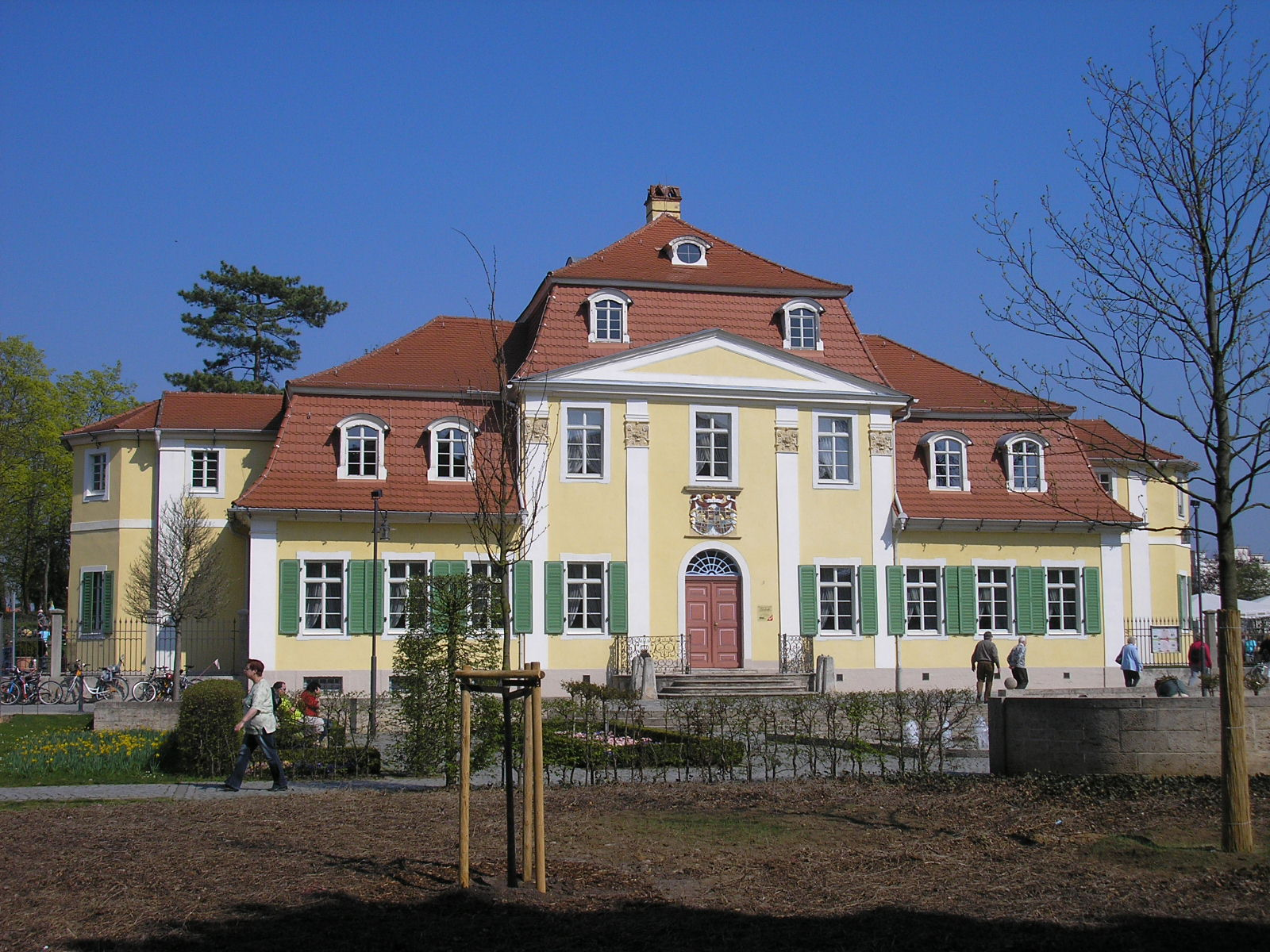
Friederikenschlösschen

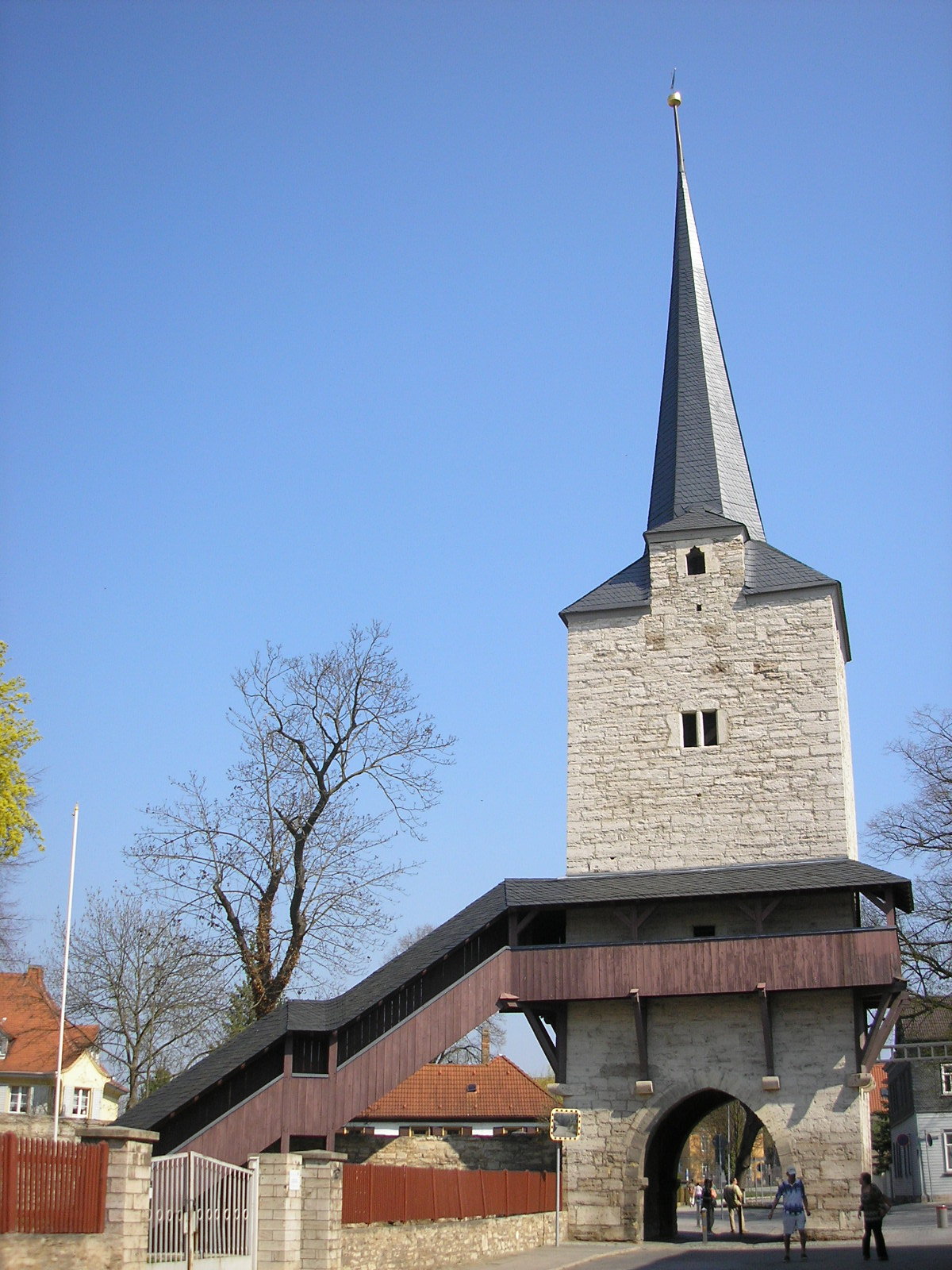
Klagentor (one of the medieval town gates)

One of the 30 medieval town wall towers

Friederikenschlösschen with Market Church in background

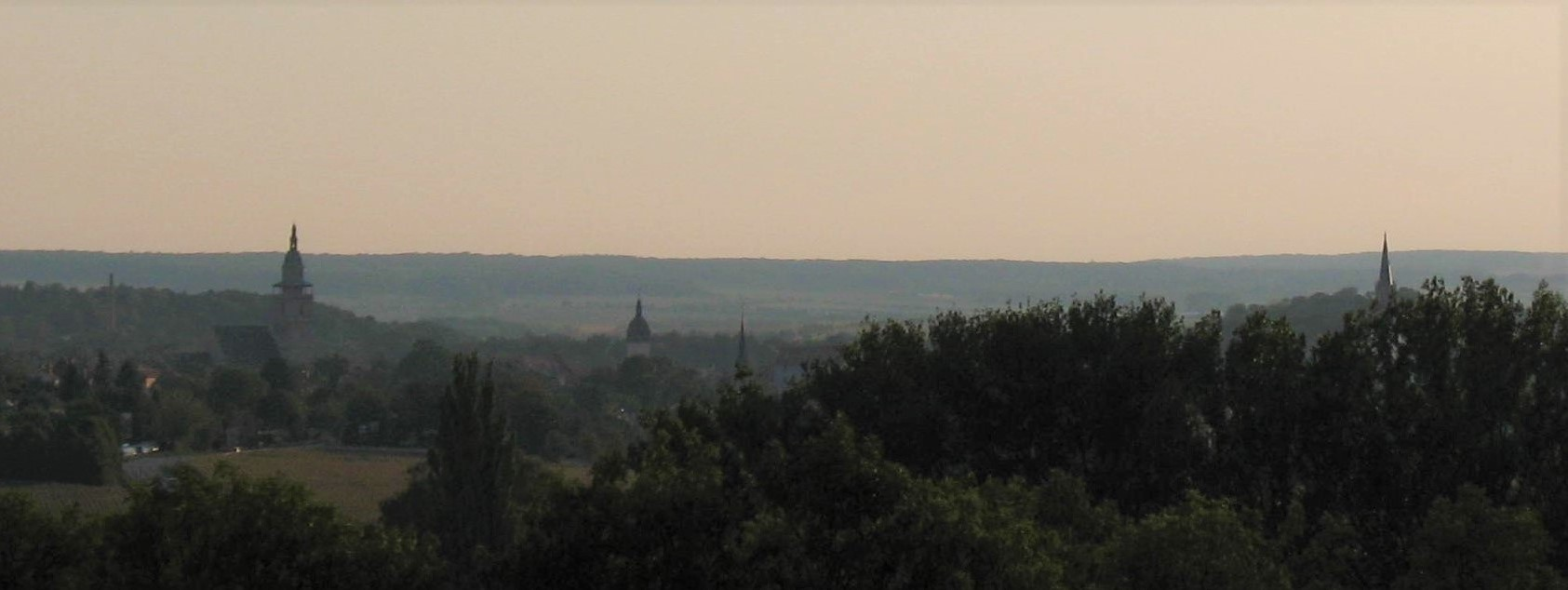
Langensalza from nearby Merxleben
