= Nägelstedt =

- Ortsteil of Bad Langensalza
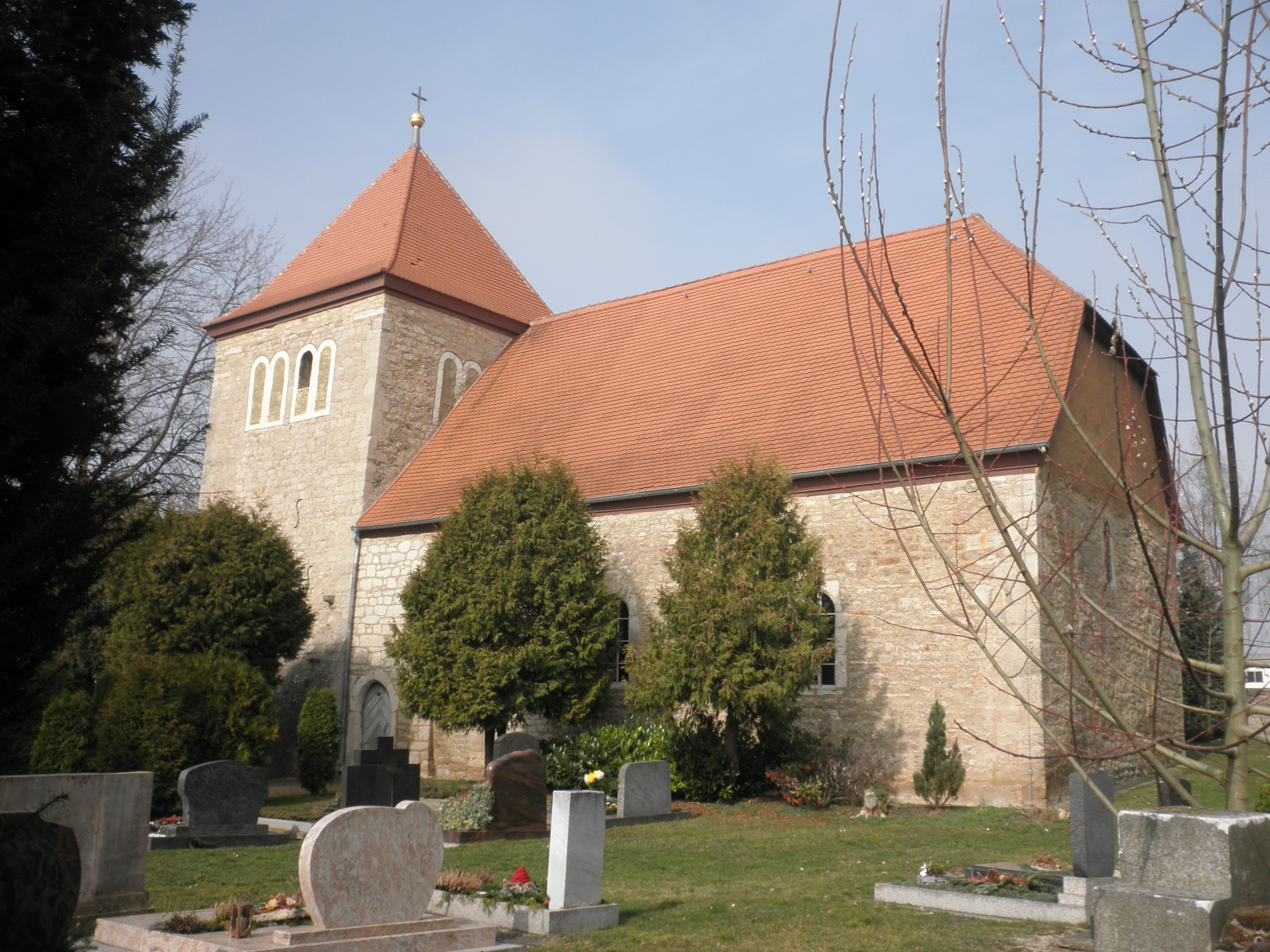
- St Michael's Church

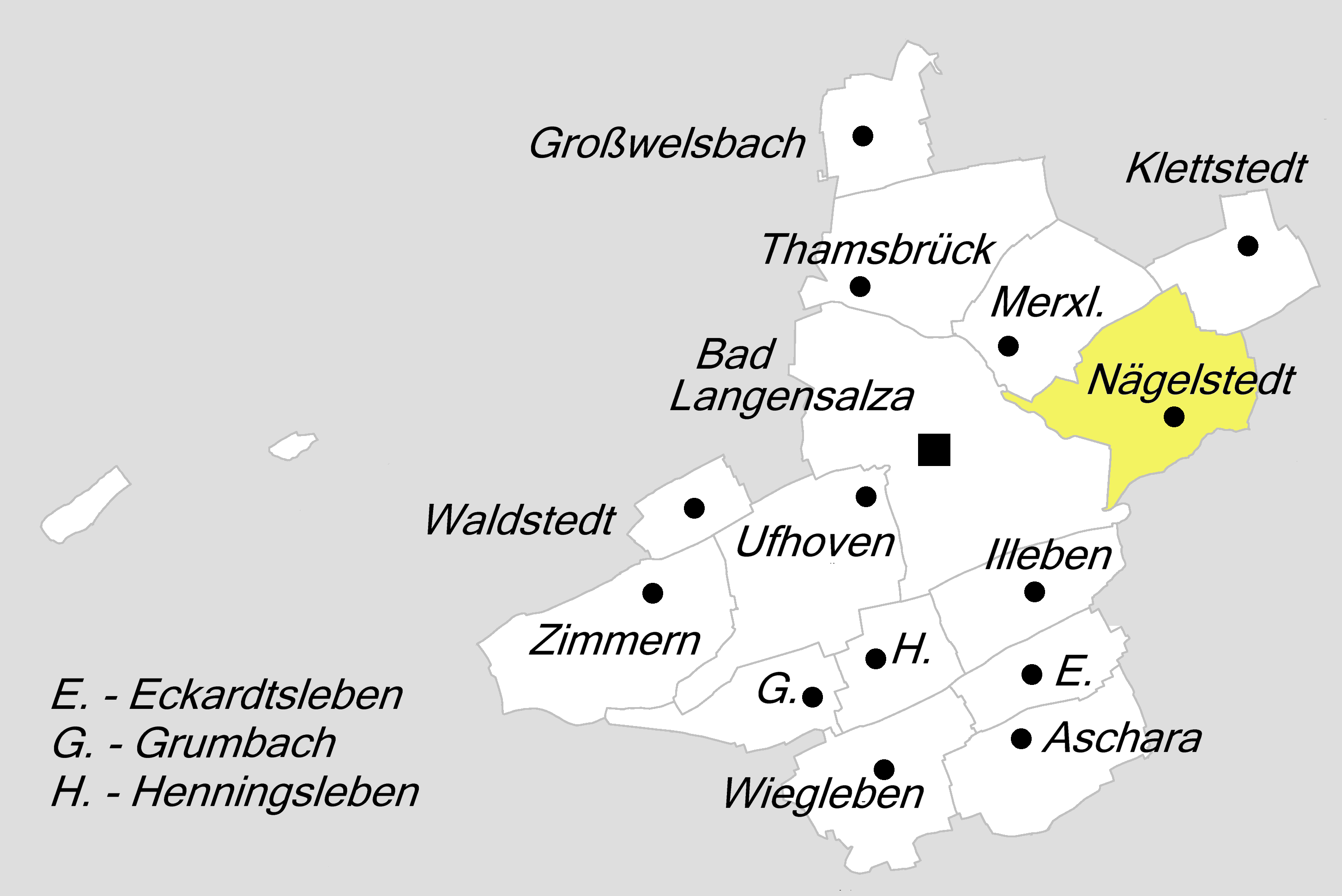
- Location of Nägelstedt within Bad Langensalza
- Interactive map of Nägelstedt
- Location within Germany Location within Thuringia
- Coordinates: 51°06′34.2″N 10°42′41.4″E
- Country: Germany
- State: Thuringia
- District: Unstrut-Hainich-Kreis
- Town: Bad Langensalza
- First mentioned: 977

Government
  - Mayor: Torsten Wronowski

Area
  - Total: 10.77 km^{2} (4.16 sq mi)
- Elevation: 197 m (646 ft)

Population (2020-12-31)
  - Total: 704
  - Density: 65.4/km^{2} (169/sq mi)
- Time zone: UTC+01:00 (CET)
  - Summer (DST): UTC+02:00 (CEST)
- Postal codes: 99947
- Dialling codes: 036042
- Website: badlangensalza.de

Nägelstedt (pronounced [ˈnɛːgl̩ʃtɛt]) is a village and a quarter of the town of Bad Langensalza in Thuringia, central Germany, with about 700 inhabitants.

== Geography ==
Nägelstedt is located 6.5 kilometres (4.0 mi) from the core town of Bad Langensalza at the edge of the Unstrut valley.

== History ==
The village was first mentioned in 977 as "Negelstete". Around 1200, the Lords of Döllstedt already owned property in the village. In 1222, the Teutonic Order, Ballei Thüringen (Bailiwick Thuringia), acquired a farm in Nägelstedt with patronage rights over St George's Church. The Order consolidated its position in the region by developing this estate into the Nägelstedt Commander's Court. The Komturhof became the administrative centre for a number of villages within a radius of 20 kilometres (12 mi). The Order remained in Nägelstedt until its dissolution in 1809.

In the Peasants' War, the (western) upper village inhabited by free, wealthy peasants and its St Michael's Church were destroyed (as was St George's Church). As late as 1540, when a visitation took place on the occasion of the introduction of the Reformation, St Michael's Church and its vicarage were found to be ruinous. In the 16th to 17th century, St Michael's Church was rebuilt.

Until 1815, the village belonged to the Electoral Saxon Amt (district) Langensalza and after its cession to Prussia from 1816 to 1944 to the district of Langensalza in the Province of Saxony.

Nägelstedt was incorporated into Bad Langensalza on 1 July 1993.

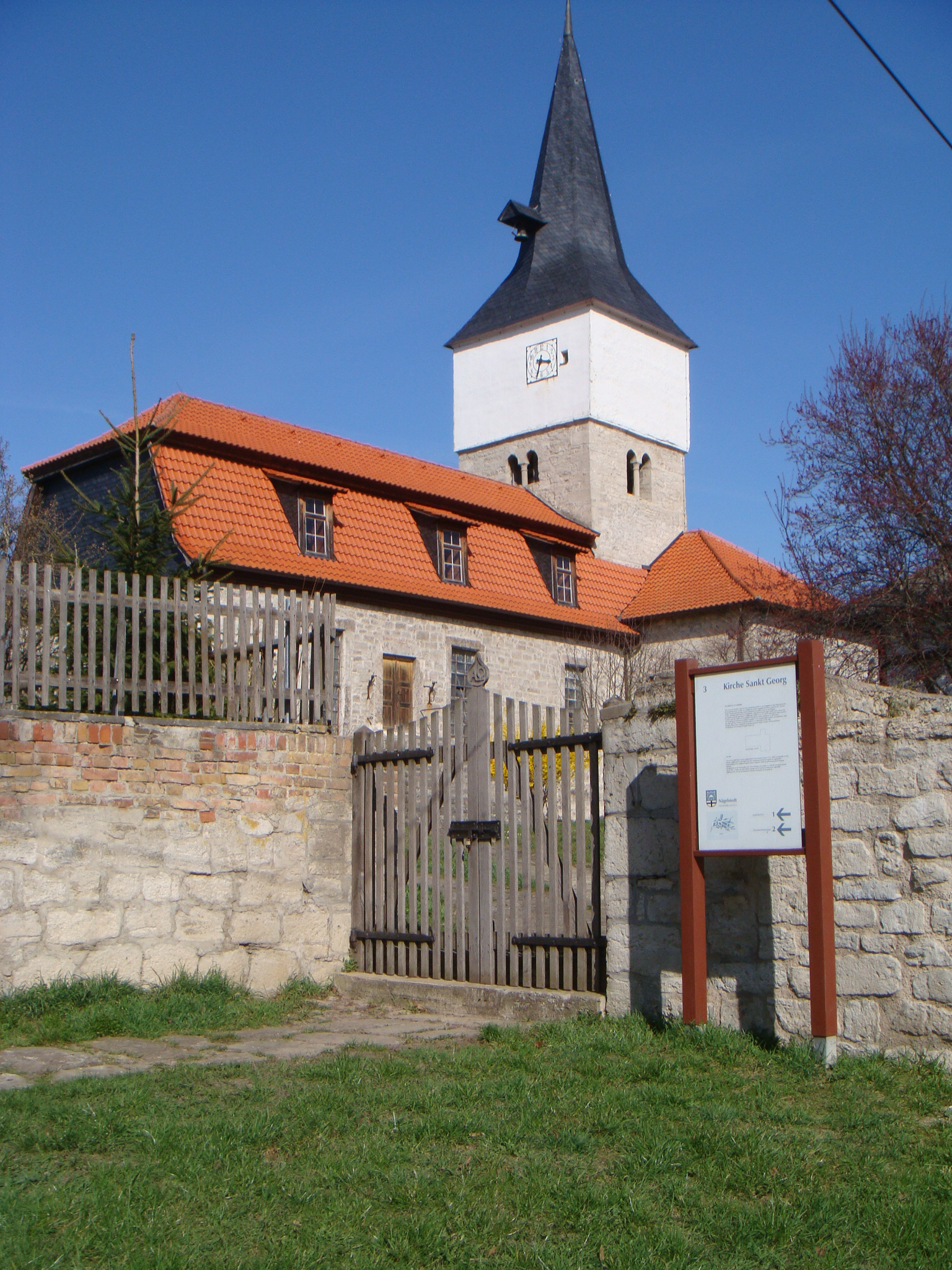
St George's Church

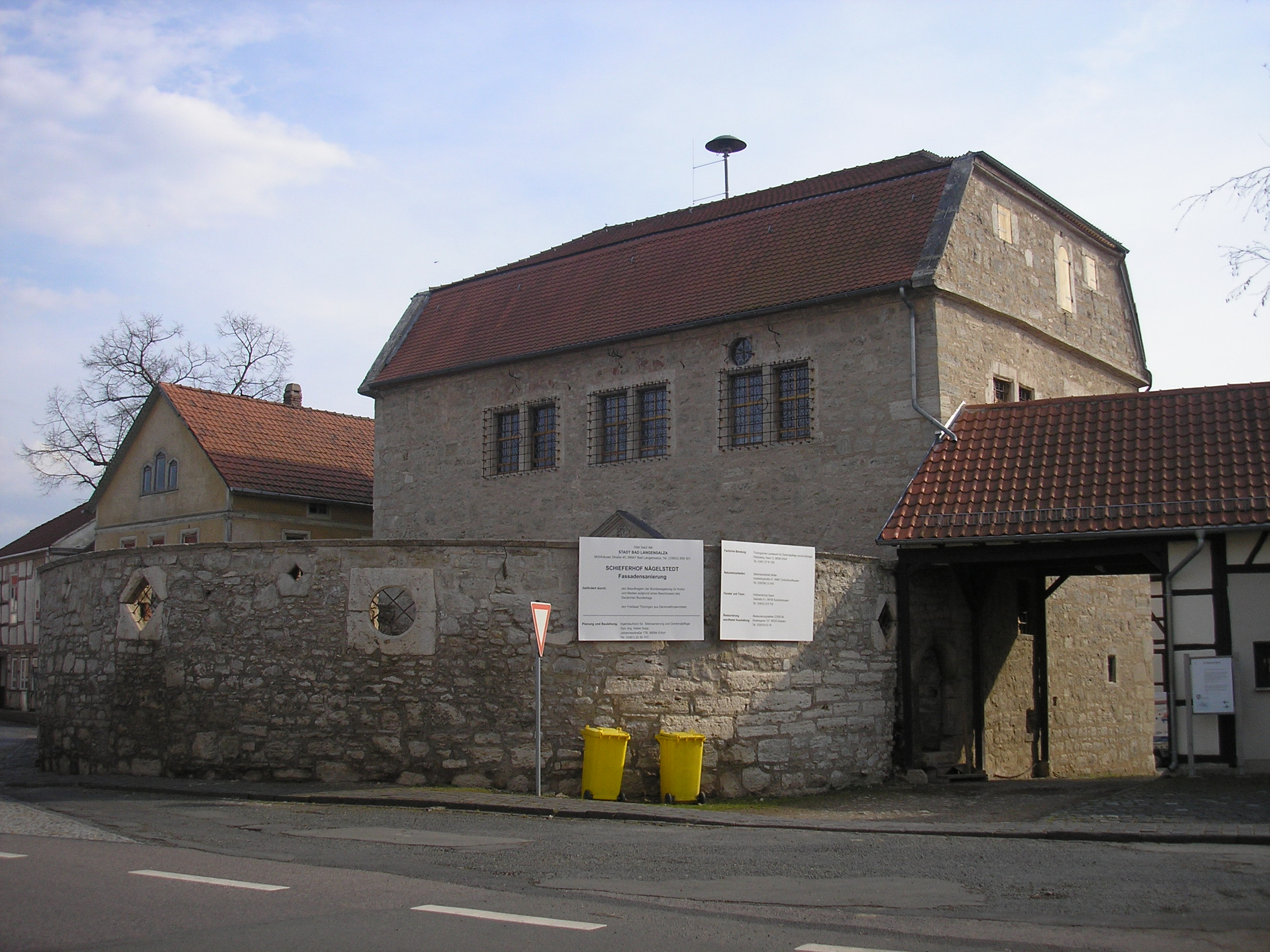
The Schieferhof at the village's centre

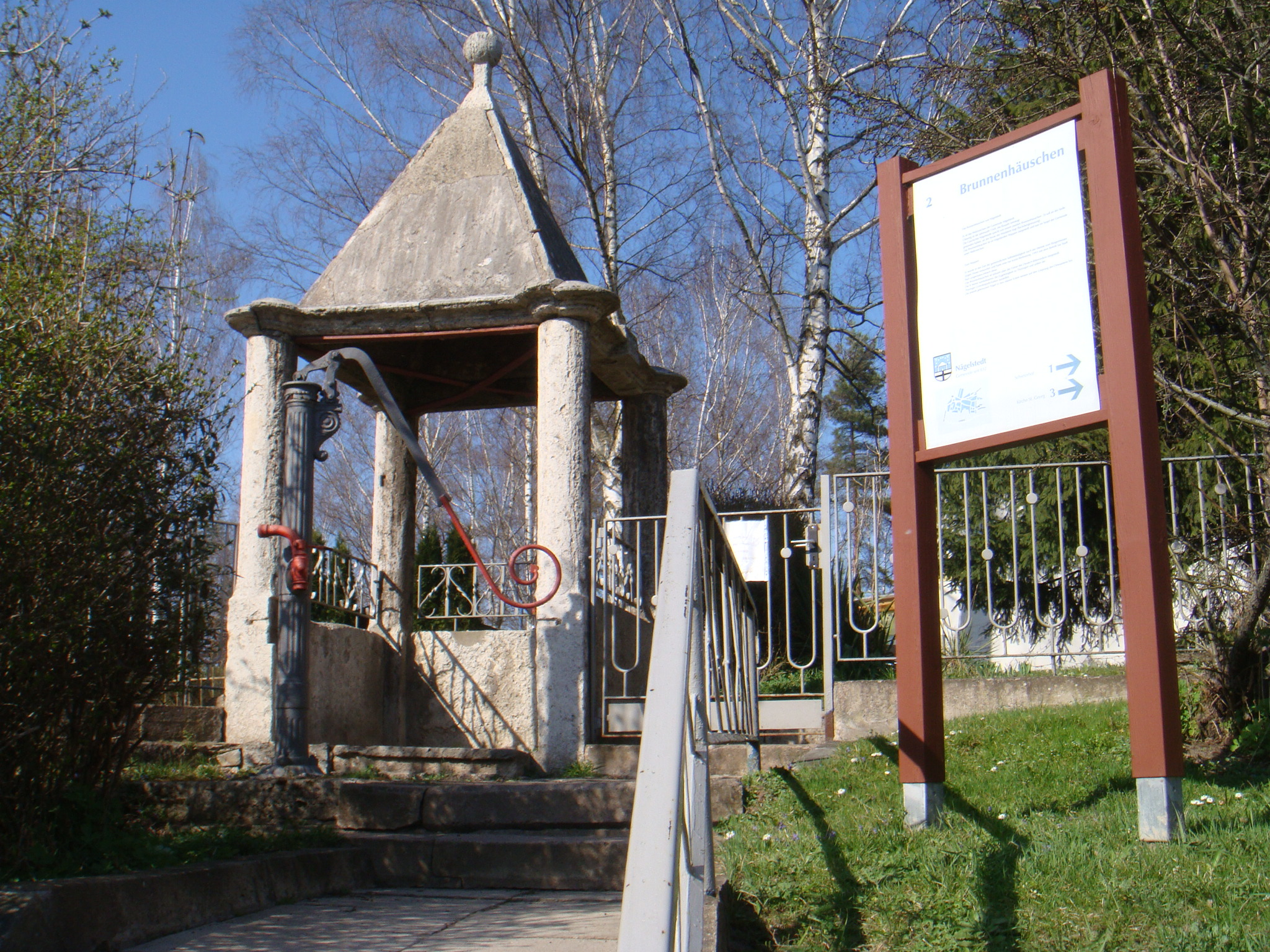
Well house

== Culture and sights ==
=== Buildings ===
- In the eastern (lower) part of the village is St George's Church. It also served as a place of worship for the Teutonic Knights and dates from the 13th century.
- St Michael' Church stands in the western (upper) village. In 1482, this church fell to the Teutonic Order, too. A first, wooden church in the village is said to have existed as early as around 800 after the Christianisation by Saint Boniface. At the entrance to the church is a memorial to the fallen and missing soldiers of both world wars from the village.
- The Schieferhof (Slate Farm) of Nägelstedt was built in 1565 by Hans von Germar, the land commander of the Teutonic Order bailiwick of Thuringia.

=== Miscellaneous ===
- North-east of the road branch to Sundhausen and Großvargula, a Linear Pottery culture settlement pit with pottery and animal bones as well as human bone remains was found during construction work. Cultic cannibalism was suspected.
- At the end of the village in an easterly direction begins the Unstruttal (Unstrut valley) hiking and nature reserve area between Nägelstedt and Großvargula, lined with protected flowers such as the yellow Adonis.

== Bibliography ==
- Lange, Eckhard (2004). Die Geschichte des Dorfes Nägelstedt von seinen Anfängen bis zum Jahr 2003 (in German). Arnstadt.
- Schuchardt, Melanie; Facius, Nadine (2007). Nägelstedter Sagen und Geschichten. Mit den Erzählungen von der Unstrutnixe bis hin zum "Schmied von Neilscht" (in German). Bad Langensalza: Rockstuhl. ISBN 978-3-86777-010-1.
