= Großvargula =

- Municipality
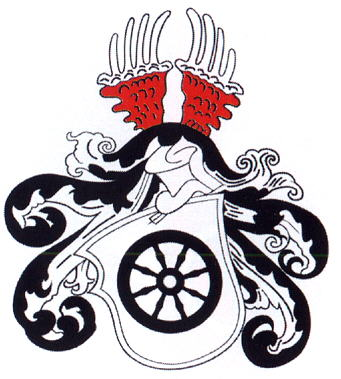
- Coat of arms

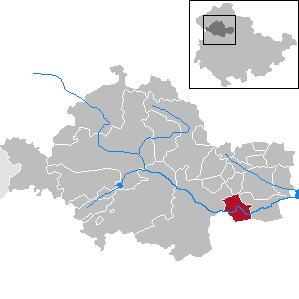
- Location of Großvargula within Unstrut-Hainich-Kreis district
- Interactive map of Großvargula
- Location within Germany Location within Thuringia
- Coordinates: 51°7′N 10°47′E
- Country: Germany
- State: Thuringia
- District: Unstrut-Hainich-Kreis

Government
  - Mayor (2022–28): Marko Wartmann

Area
  - Total: 15.19 km^{2} (5.86 sq mi)
- Elevation: 166 m (545 ft)

Population (2025-12-31)
  - Total: 689
  - Density: 45.4/km^{2} (117/sq mi)
- Time zone: UTC+01:00 (CET)
  - Summer (DST): UTC+02:00 (CEST)
- Postal codes: 99958
- Dialling codes: 036042
- Vehicle registration: UH
- Website: www.grossvargula.de

Großvargula is a municipality in the Unstrut-Hainich-Kreis district of Thuringia, Germany.
