= Salza (Unstrut) =

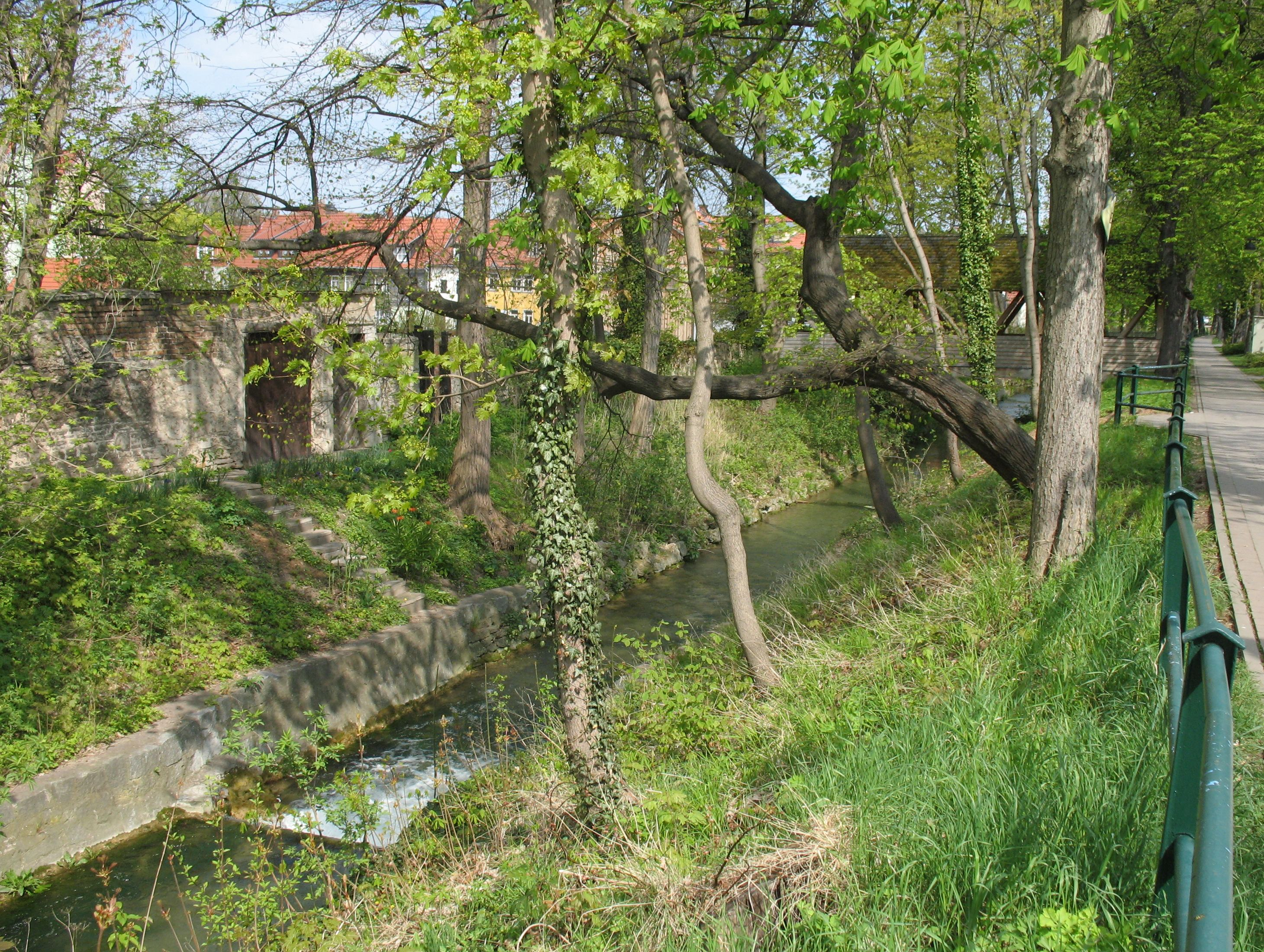
- Salza in Bad Langensalza

Location
- Country: Germany
- States: Thuringia

Physical characteristics
- Mouth
  - location: Unstrut
  - coordinates: 51.1195°N 10.6703°E

Basin features
- Progression: Unstrut→ Saale→ Elbe→ North Sea

Salza (German pronunciation: [ˈzaltsa]) is a river of Thuringia, Germany. It flows into the Unstrut near Bad Langensalza.

== See also ==
- List of rivers of Thuringia
