= Johann Ernst Gotzkowsky =

Prussian merchant, art dealer and diplomat (1710–1775)

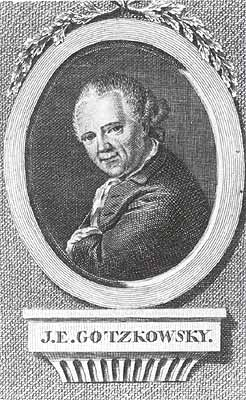

Johann Ernst Gotzkowsky (21 November 1710 – 9 August 1775) was a Prussian merchant with a successful trade in trinkets, silk, taft, porcelain, grain and bills of exchange. Moreover, he acted as a diplomat and important art dealer. His paintings formed the basis and the beginning of the collection in the Hermitage Museum. Gotzkowsky died impoverished and having left behind an autobiography: Geschichte eines patriotischen Kaufmanns (1768), which was translated into French and reprinted three times in the 18th century.

== Biography ==
Gotzkowsky was born in Konitz (Chojnice) in Royal Prussia, Polish–Lithuanian Commonwealth and descended from an impoverished family of Polish nobility. Both his parents died when he was five years old as a result of the plague, which broke out after the Great Northern War. Gotzkowsky grew up with relatives in Dresden, who neglected his education. As a 14-year-old he went to Berlin to live with his brother and to apprentice in business with Adrian Sprögel till 1730. When Sprögel's business burned down, he joined his brother in the haberdashery. He established him in his jewel and trinket shop and he quickly acquired customers in the highest circles; Sophia Dorothea of Hanover was his best client. After he met with Frederick the Great Gotzkowsky received a royal warrant. In 1741 he became a Freemason. In 1745, he married the daughter of the rich lace maker Blume. Gotzkowsky persuaded his father-in-law to start a velvet factory, which he managed and inherited in the year after. Then Frederick II commissioned Gotzkowsky to promote the silk trade to compete with France; since 1752/3 Gotzkowsky ran a silk factory employing 1,500 persons. Frederick also followed his recommendations in the field of toll levies and import restrictions.

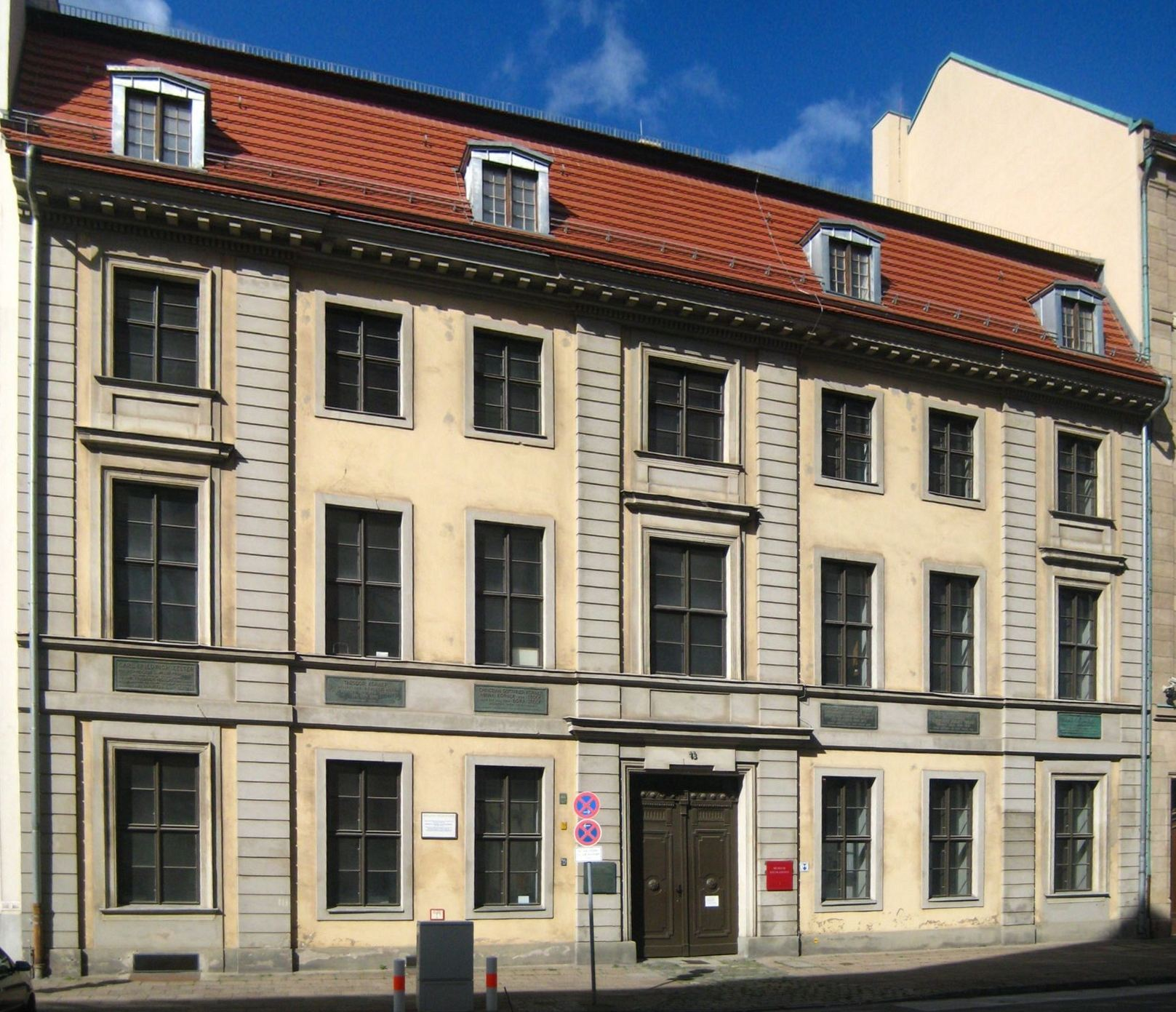
Gotzkowsky lived at Brüderstraße 13, Berlin, Mitte

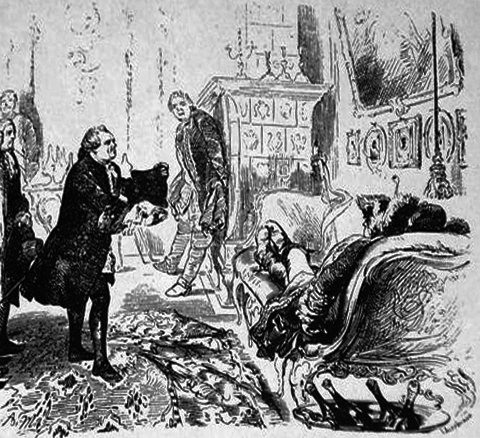
The merchant Gotzkowsky asks the Russian commander lying on the sofa (Tottleben?) to indulge the city of Berlin

During the Seven Years' War Gotzkowsky supplied the Prussian army and entered into consultation with Russian and Austrian army leaders, especially after the Prussian defeat at Kunersdorf in August 1759. On 9 October 1760 Berlin's City Council decided to surrender the city formally to the Russians rather than the Austrians, as Austria was Prussia's bitterest enemy. The Russians immediately made a demand for 4 million thalers in exchange for the protection of private property. On 11 October Gotzkowsky took over the negotiations on behalf of the city council and was able to persuade Heinrich von Tottleben to reduce the levy to 1.5 million thalers. with only 500,000 thalers, collected among the city's merchants, payable immediately in prewar coins? Tottleben moved into his house but left on the 13th. Later that month, Gotzkowsky traveled to Königsberg in Prussia as a guarantor for the redemption money. He was arrested, and released after promising a deposit of 62.000 (or 150.000 thaler)? Gotzkowsky succeeded to involve a Hamburg bank, owned by Philipp Heinrich II von Stenglin (1718–1793) to pay the amount, but the Russians received only 57.437 thaler in debased Saxonian coins. Again Gotzkowsky traveled to Danzig to bribe the Russian generals with 24 golden snuff boxes. In February 1761 Von Tottleben was accused of treason. (The sources are confusing.)

Gotzkowsky mentions that Ephraim & Itzig sent him loads of (debased) coins at the beginning of October, which he stored in his cellar. According to himself, the production of more debased coins began at the end of October to pay off the Russians and the Austrians. At the same time Gotzkowsky supported Saxony to pay its war contribution to Prussia. In the summer of 1761 he ordered 400.000 thaler in debased coins not from the Prussian mint masters, but from Heinrich Carl von Schimmelmann. Since August Schimmelmann produced debased coins in Rethwisch, and sent for 100.000 thaler to Leipzig. As the (foreign) debased coins, like Plöner and Zerbster, Bernburger coins were not accepted (by Frederick and Ephraim & Itzig) Gotzkowsky suggested to spread half of the amount under the Allies. The men were arrested in Bielefeld and the money was confiscated and melted down. Gotzkowsky was not impressed, in January 1762 he helped Leipzig for the second time. In September 1762 he travelled to Hamburg in order to borrow money for the distressed city of Berlin.

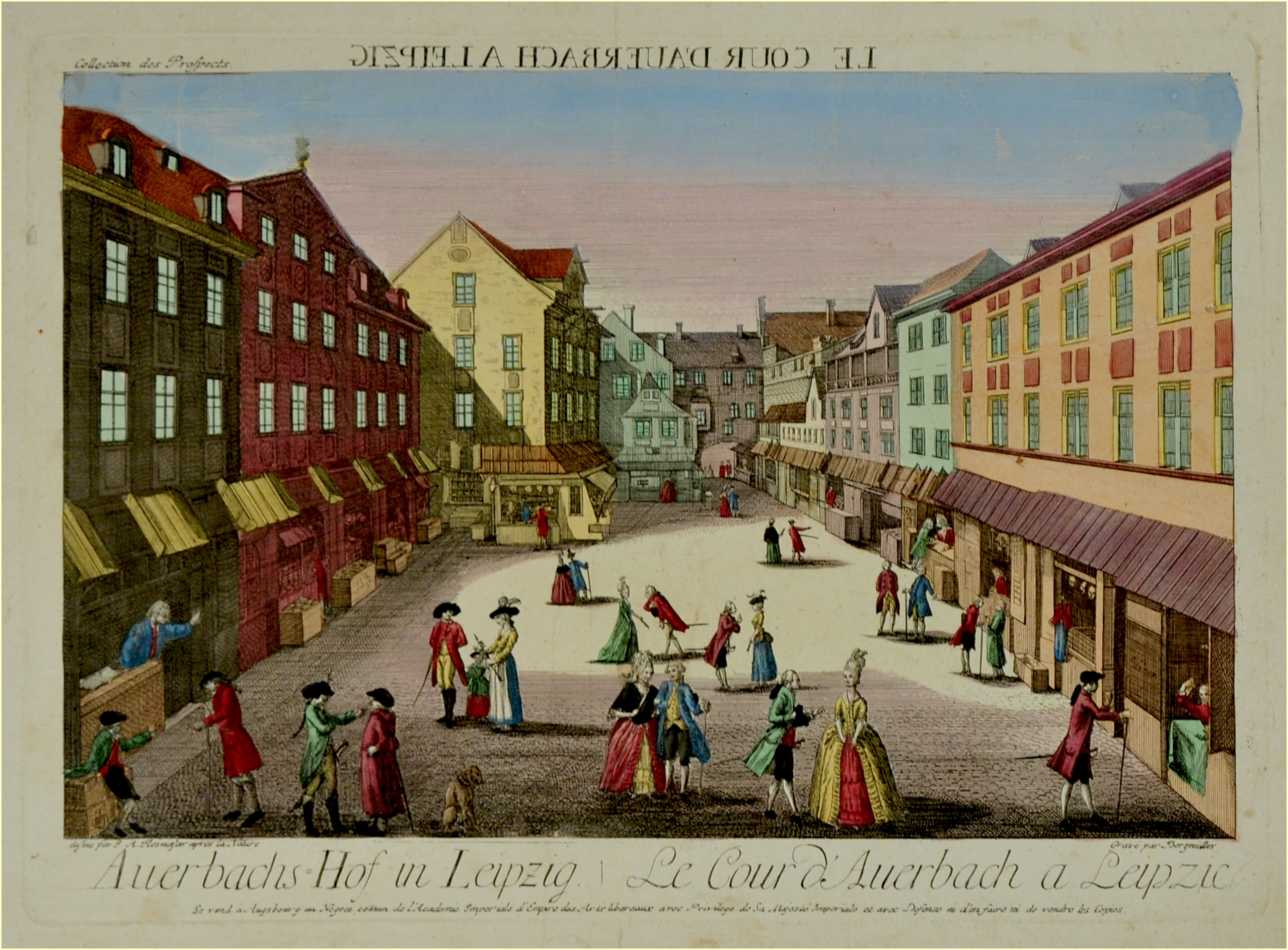
Auerbachs Hof in Leipzig where Gotzkowsky and Streckfuss ran a jewelry shop

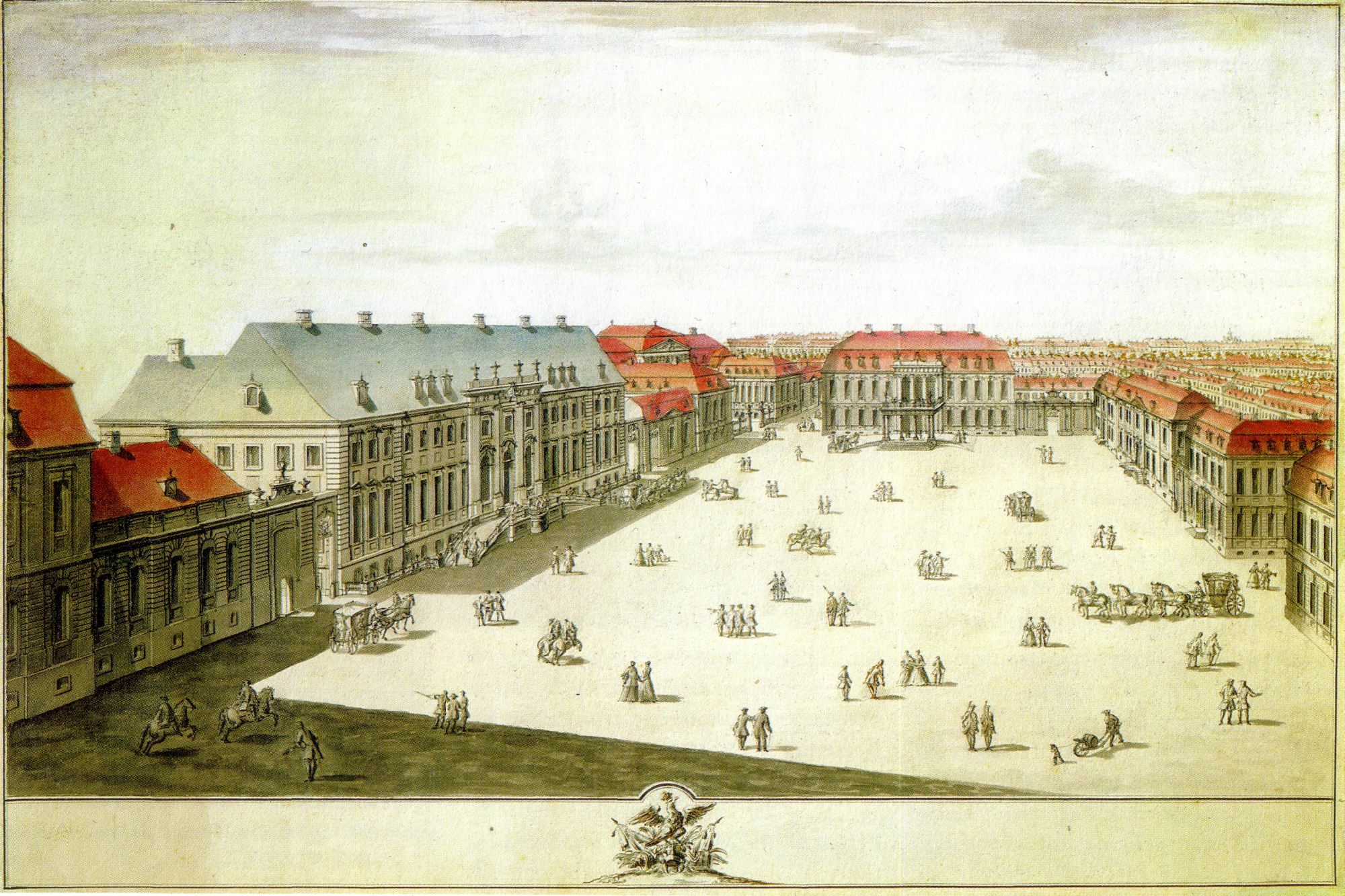
Early 1763 Gotzkowsky bought Palais Marschall (with the blue roofs) at Wilhelmsstraße 78, but had to sell it a few months later. To the left the Königliche Gold- und Silbermanufaktur (Wilhelmsstraße No. 79), rented by Ephraim

In January Gotzkowsky remarried a 25-year-old ballet-dancer. In April 1763 Gotzkowsky and Leendert Pieter de Neufville paid a visit to Frederick. On 19 April they bought a huge amount of grain (oats) from the Russian envoy Vladimir Sergeevich Dolgorukov (1717 - 1803). It was stored in Kolberg and unuseful after the Russian army had left Poland. Because of a shortage in Prussia, the transaction could have been profitable for Gotzkowsky and De Neufville, collaborating with two partners (Von Stein and Leveaux). Legal problems caused the grain to not be exported. When it became clear that half of the grain turned out to be of bad quality, Gotzkowsky preferred to change the contract and offered to pay 2/3 of 1.2 million guilders. The Russians refused and insisted to be paid promptly in Dutch guilders, and not in debased Prussian coins. Leveaux and Von Stein dropping out of grain deal must have been a shock to Neufville and Gotzkowsky. The restructuring of the Gotzkowsky deal put tremendous pressure on both men. By the end of July 1763, Gotzkowsky had difficulty paying the lacking 700.000 and feared to go bankrupt. Gotzkowsky had also an impressive number of paintings in stock which he had not sold to Frederick during the war and managed a silkworks, a jewelry business in Leipzig with J.R. Streckfuss, a porcelain factory (now KPM) that was not running at his satisfactory, all at the same time.

Gotzkowsky was clearly relying on De Neufville to pay his share of the purchase of the Russian magazine. De Neufville was, in turn, relying on people like Aron Joseph. When Joseph went bankrupt on 25 July, the chain unraveled. This caused a general loss of confidence in bills from Hamburg, Berlin, etc. by Amsterdam merchants. Loss of funding from Amsterdam then forced many merchants in Germany into bankruptcy.

On 2 August the infamous Amsterdam company De Neufville was not able to assist and borrow the money from the banks in Amsterdam. The next day De Neufville asked for a postponement of payment. On 4 August Gotzkowsky asked for a deferral. The deferrals resulted to an international financial crisis in Hamburg (90-97), Frankfurt (30), Berlin (33), Danzig, Breslau, Stockholm, London and Amsterdam (38). On 8 August Gotzkowsky, who did not make any balances since the beginning of the war, was rightly pointed out and got six weeks postponement and no more. On 10 August Frederick obliged Veitel-Heine Ephraim and Daniel Itzig under the absolute condition to support Gotzkowsky with 400,000 thaler. Ephraim and Itzig refused and were of the opinion that the bankruptcy of Gotzkowsky was inevitable. On Monday 22 August Frederick set up an "Immediate Exchange Commission", a special court for the tricky bill bankruptcy whose origin he simply could not explain. On 24 August Frederick offered Gotzkowsky to buy his silk- and porcelain factory for 460.000 thaler. On 30 August Gotzkowsky protested against the bankruptcy of De Neufville; it could take many years to solve the question. On 30 January 1764, Gotzkowsky applied for his bankruptcy. In April 1764, Gotzkowsky offered 50% compensation to his creditors.

Gotzkowsky died in 1775 in Berlin.

== Art collector ==
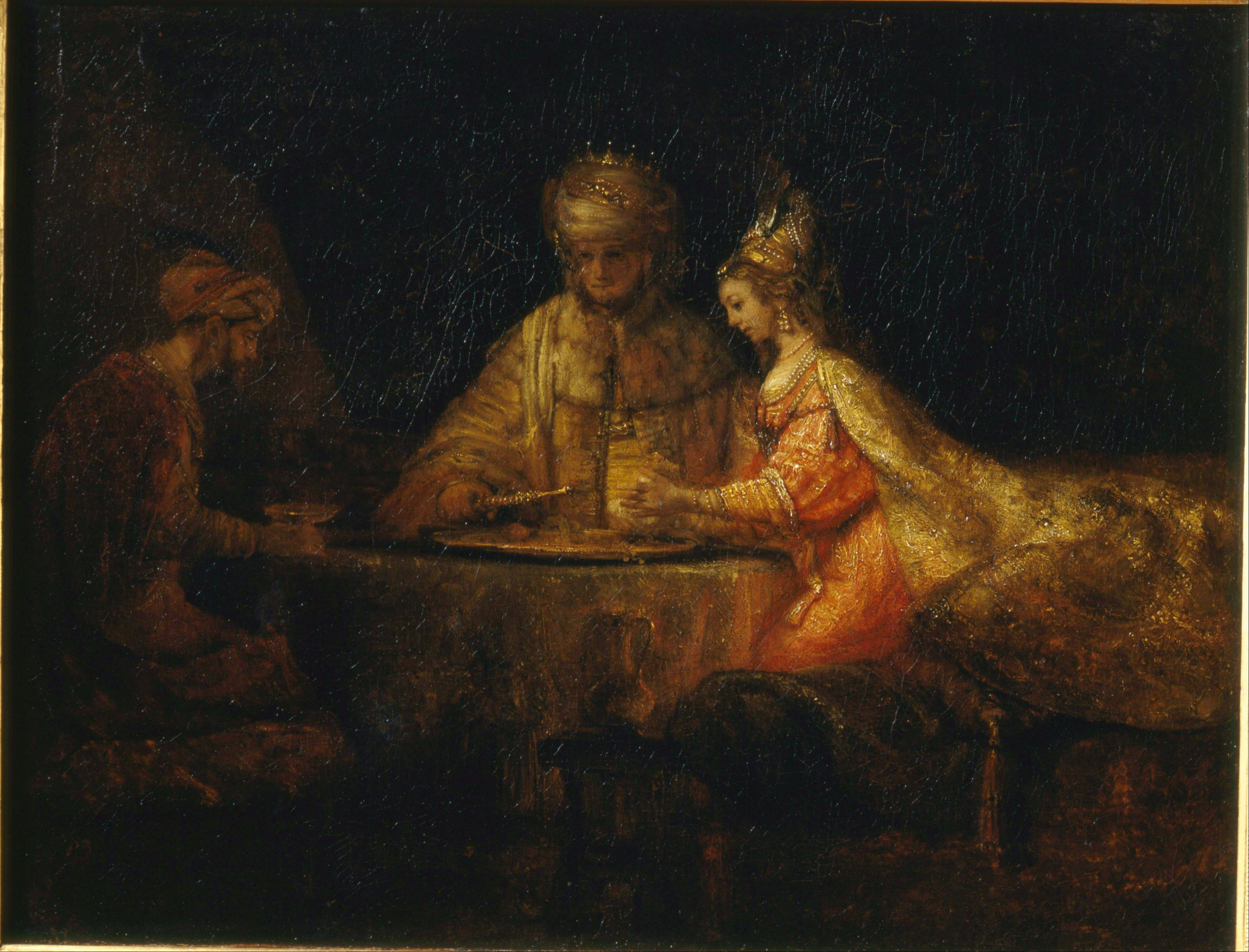
Ahasverus and Haman at the feast of Esther, Rembrandt (1660), 73x94cm, Pushkin museum. The painting is rather dark, because of the varnish that once has been used

Around 1750 Gotzkowsky started to collect Old Masters. He was in contact with Carl Heinrich von Heineken in Dresden as a mediator since 1755. Gotzkowsky bought paintings by Antonio Maria Zanetti from the Palazzo Labia and Andrea Celesti in Venice, Rembrandts in Amsterdam for the collection of Frederick II, who had set up the Picture Gallery. Frederick had a preference for Antoine Pesne, which were bought by Gotzkowsky in France. In 1761 he bought a painting by the Prussian Jakob Philipp Hackert. On 10 December 1763 when Gotzkowsky was unable to pay for the Russian grain Gotzkowsky decided to provide 317 paintings, including 90 not precisely known, to the Russian crown to satisfy the obligations of Catherine the Great. Flemish and Dutch masters such as Rembrandt (13 paintings), Rubens (11 paintings), Jacob Jordaens (7 paintings), Anthony van Dyck (5 paintings), Paolo Veronese (5 paintings), Frans Hals (3 paintings), Raphael (2 paintings), Holbein (2 paintings), Titian (1 painting), Jan Steen, Hendrick Goltzius, Dirck van Baburen, Hendrick van Balen en Gerrit van Honthorst formed the basis and the beginning of the collection in the Hermitage. One of the Rembrandts in the possession of Gotzkowsky was Ahasuerus and Haman at the feast of Esther. This last painting came from the collection of the Amsterdam cloth dealer Jan J. Hinlopen. It is possible that De Neufville sold some of his paintings to Gotzkowsky by hand.

A focal point of Berlin society during the war years was the residence of Gotzkowsky, whose gardens and paintings were admired both by the old nobility and new bourgeoisie. In 1764 James Boswell came to him on a visit and called him: a gallant German, stupid, comely, cordial. In 1767 Gotzkowsky went bankrupt for the second time.

== KPM ==
In 1761, Frederick ordered Gotzkowsky to take over the porcelain factory of Wilhelm Caspar Wegely, which had struggled because of the Seven Years' War. Gotzkowsky attracted competent staff from Meissen, which was occupied in 1760 by the Prussian army. A relief on Meissen porcelain was named after him. Frederick the Great took over the factory on 24 August 1763 when Gotzkowsky was in serious trouble. The company is still known as the Royal Porcelain Manufacture (KPM). The "manufacture" was located at Leipziger Strasse 3 and 4, not far from Potsdamer Platz where now the Bundesrat of Germany is located. The factory had twelve furnaces and 400 men in service. Frederick, who was his best customer, demanded of the Jewish traders and the lotterie to take his porcelain in their assortment. The former silk and porcelain factory was from 1825 up to 1851 in the possession of Abraham Mendelssohn Bartholdy, who had built a very representative mansion on the property. From 1871 there the Reichstag stood, during the German Empire.

A street, a bridge and a school in Berlin are named in honor of Gotzkowsky.

== Sources ==
- L.K.J. Beutin (1933) Die Wirkungen des Siebenjährigen Krieges auf die Volkswirtschaft in Preussen. (Vierteljahrschrift für Sozial- und Wirtschaftsgeschichte. Sonderabdruck XXVI. Bd. Hft. 3.).
- J.E. Gotzkowsky (1768) Geschichte eines patriotischen Kaufmanns. Berlin.
- Jong-Keesing, E.E. de (1939) De economische crisis van 1763 te Amsterdam.
- H. Rachel & P. Wallich (1967) Berliner Grosskaufleute und Kapitalisten: Bd II. Die Zeit des Merkantillismus 1648-1806.
- E. Ris (2016) Eremitage aus Berlin. Die Gemäldesammlung von Johann Ernst Gotzkowsky als Grundstock der Bildergalerie der russischen Zarin Katharina II. in St. Petersburg.
- N.S. Schepkowski (2009) Johann Ernst Gotzkowsky. Kunstagent und Gemäldesammler im friderizianischen Berlin. Akademie-Verlag, Berlin. ISBN 978-3-05-004437-8.
- H. Sieveking (1933) Die Hamburger Bank 1619 – 1875, p. 70-71. In: Festschrift der Hamburgischen Universität ihrem Ehrenrektor Herrn Bürgermeister Werner von Melle.
- S. Skalweit (1937) Die Berliner Wirtschaftkrise von 1763 und ihre Hintergründe.
