= Tottleben =

- Municipality
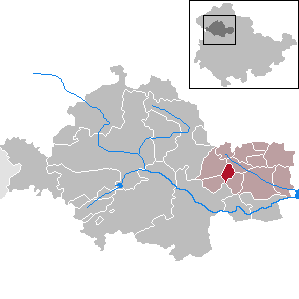
- Location of Tottleben within Unstrut-Hainich-Kreis district
- Interactive map of Tottleben
- Location within Germany Location within Thuringia
- Coordinates: 51°10′N 10°45′E
- Country: Germany
- State: Thuringia
- District: Unstrut-Hainich-Kreis

Government
  - Mayor (2022–28): Jens Scheidig

Area
  - Total: 5.04 km^{2} (1.95 sq mi)
- Elevation: 210 m (690 ft)

Population (2025-12-31)
  - Total: 139
  - Density: 27.6/km^{2} (71.4/sq mi)
- Time zone: UTC+01:00 (CET)
  - Summer (DST): UTC+02:00 (CEST)
- Postal codes: 99947
- Dialling codes: 036043
- Vehicle registration: UH
- Website: www.tottleben.info

Tottleben is a municipality in the Unstrut-Hainich-Kreis district of Thuringia, Germany.

== Geography ==
The municipality Tottleben is 7 km away from the western edge of Bad Tennstedt at an altitude of 210–315 meters. Through the village leads the L 2127, which connects Tottleben with the neighboring Großurleben in the southeast and with Kirchheilingen in the northwest.

== History ==
The municipality was mentioned for the first time in 988. The place belonged to 1815 to Saxon Office Langensalza and after his assignment to Prussia from 1816 to 1944 to district Langensalza in the Province of Saxony.

== Politics ==
=== Council ===
The local council of Tottleben has 6 members.

- FWG fighters: 6 seats

(Stand: local elections on June 7, 2009)

== Mayor ==
The honorary mayor Steffen Mörstedt was re-elected on June 6, 2010

== Notable people ==
- Gottlob Heinrich Curt von Tottleben (1715-1773), general

== Sites ==
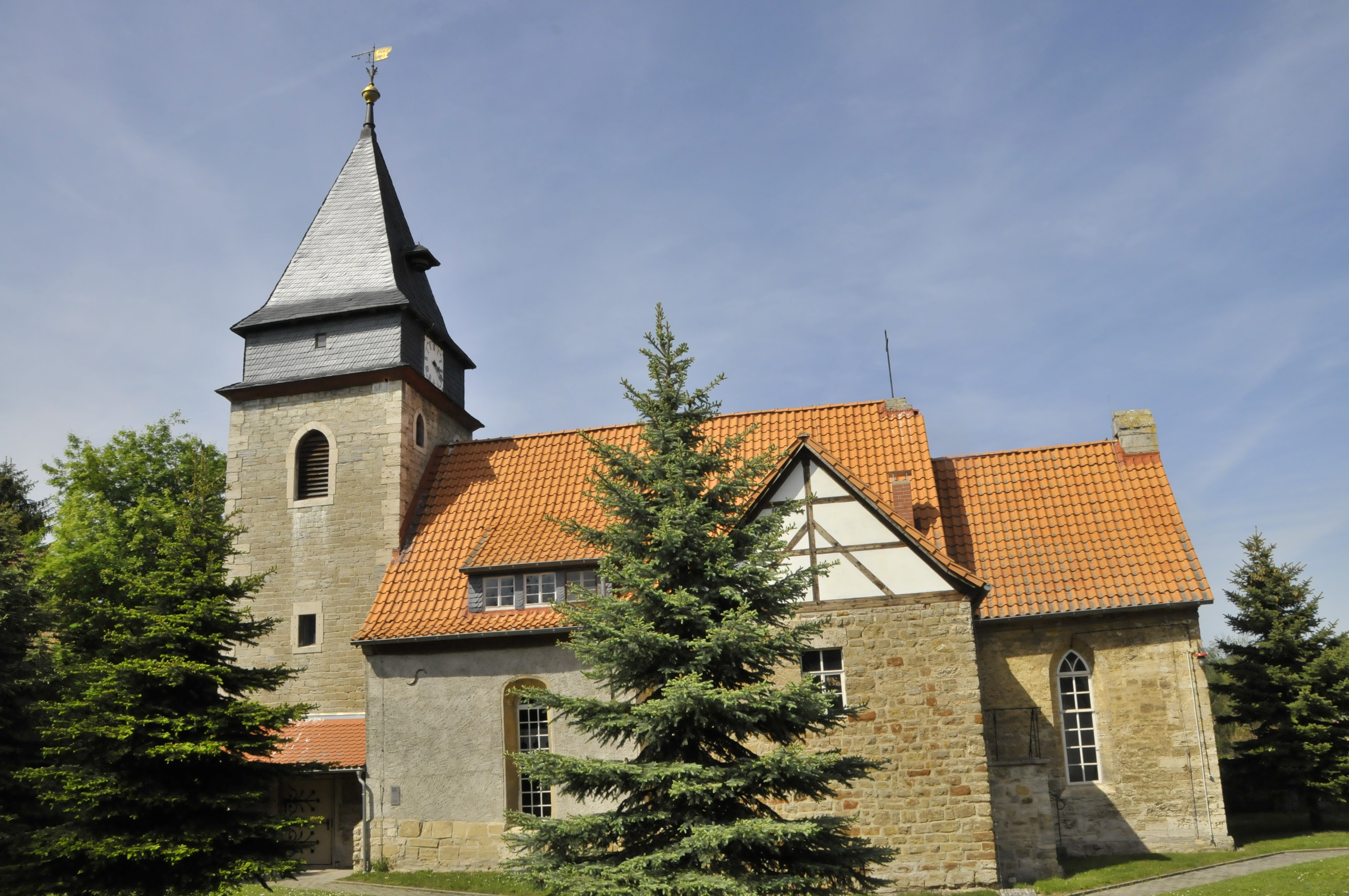
Tottleben-St. Anna Kirche

The most striking sight in the area is the village church of St. Anna. The parish is part of the parish Kirchheilingen. The most famous son of the place was Gottlieb Heinrich Totleben (1715-1773), officer, general and adventurer, who was in Saxon and Russian service.
