= Bad Tennstedt (Verwaltungsgemeinschaft) =

- Verwaltungsgemeinschaft
- Map of Unstrut-Hainich-Kreis highlighting Bad Tennstedt
- Interactive map of Bad Tennstedt
- Location within Germany Location within Thuringia
- Coordinates: 51°09′N 10°50′E
- Country: Germany
- State: Thuringia
- District: Unstrut-Hainich-Kreis
- Seat: Bad Tennstedt
- Subdivisions: 12 municipalities

Area
  - Total: 133.62 km^{2} (51.59 sq mi)

Population (2025-12-31)
  - Total: 6,411
  - Density: 47.98/km^{2} (124.3/sq mi)
- Time zone: UTC+01:00 (CET)
  - Summer (DST): UTC+02:00 (CEST)
- Website: www.badtennstedt.de

Bad Tennstedt is a Verwaltungsgemeinschaft in the district of Unstrut-Hainich-Kreis in Thuringia, Germany. The seat of the Verwaltungsgemeinschaft is in Bad Tennstedt.

The Verwaltungsgemeinschaft Bad Tennstedt consists of the following municipalities:

1. Bad Tennstedt
2. Ballhausen
3. Blankenburg
4. Bruchstedt
5. Haussömmern
6. Hornsömmern
7. Kirchheilingen
8. Kutzleben
9. Mittelsömmern
10. Sundhausen
11. Tottleben
12. Urleben
