= Kammerforst =

- Municipality
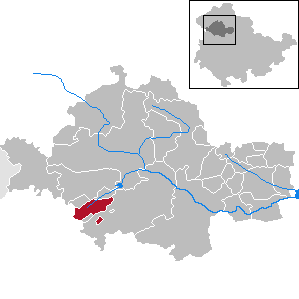
- Location of Kammerforst within Unstrut-Hainich-Kreis district
- Interactive map of Kammerforst
- Location within Germany Location within Thuringia
- Coordinates: 51°7′19″N 10°25′33″E
- Country: Germany
- State: Thuringia
- District: Unstrut-Hainich-Kreis

Government
  - Mayor (2019–25): Christian Konkel

Area
  - Total: 16.92 km^{2} (6.53 sq mi)
- Elevation: 271 m (889 ft)

Population (2025-12-31)
  - Total: 776
  - Density: 45.9/km^{2} (119/sq mi)
- Time zone: UTC+01:00 (CET)
  - Summer (DST): UTC+02:00 (CEST)
- Postal codes: 99986
- Dialling codes: 036028
- Vehicle registration: UH
- Website: www.vg-vogtei.de

Kammerforst (German pronunciation: [ˈkamɐˌfɔʁst]) is a municipality in the Unstrut-Hainich-Kreis district of Thuringia, Germany.
