= Haussömmern =

- Municipality
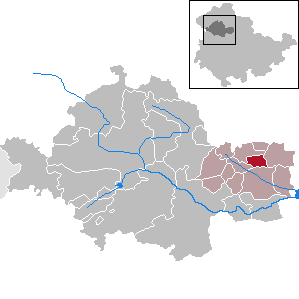
- Location of Haussömmern within Unstrut-Hainich-Kreis district
- Interactive map of Haussömmern
- Location within Germany Location within Thuringia
- Coordinates: 51°11′N 10°49′E
- Country: Germany
- State: Thuringia
- District: Unstrut-Hainich-Kreis
- Municipal assoc.: Bad Tennstedt

Government
  - Mayor (2022–28): Denis Voigt

Area
  - Total: 6.42 km^{2} (2.48 sq mi)
- Elevation: 260 m (850 ft)

Population (2025-12-31)
  - Total: 198
  - Density: 30.8/km^{2} (79.9/sq mi)
- Time zone: UTC+01:00 (CET)
  - Summer (DST): UTC+02:00 (CEST)
- Postal codes: 99955
- Dialling codes: 036041
- Vehicle registration: UH
- Website: www.badtennstedt.de

Haussömmern is a municipality in the Unstrut-Hainich-Kreis district of Thuringia, Germany.
