= Bruchstedt =

- Municipality
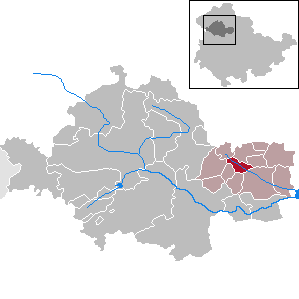
- Location of Bruchstedt within Unstrut-Hainich-Kreis district
- Interactive map of Bruchstedt
- Location within Germany Location within Thuringia
- Coordinates: 51°10′N 10°46′E
- Country: Germany
- State: Thuringia
- District: Unstrut-Hainich-Kreis
- Municipal assoc.: Bad Tennstedt

Government
  - Mayor (2022–28): Dominik Gary

Area
  - Total: 6.79 km^{2} (2.62 sq mi)
- Elevation: 218 m (715 ft)

Population (2025-12-31)
  - Total: 268
  - Density: 39.5/km^{2} (102/sq mi)
- Time zone: UTC+01:00 (CET)
  - Summer (DST): UTC+02:00 (CEST)
- Postal codes: 99955
- Dialling codes: 036041
- Vehicle registration: UH
- Website: www.badtennstedt.de

Bruchstedt is a municipality in the Unstrut-Hainich-Kreis district of Thuringia, Germany.

== History ==
At the beginning of the 9th century Bruchstedt was first mentioned in a directory of the Patrimony of the Archbishop Lullus († 786), Hersfeld Abbey as Brutstede in context with Tennstedt. ( Dennistede )

Bruchstedt was affected in 1663 by the witch-hunt. Anna Maria Lorenzen got into a witch-hunt and was punished with banishment.

1816 came Bruchstedt due to the Congress of Vienna to the Kreis Langensalza of the Prussian Province of Saxony.

On the night of 23 May to 24 May 1950, due to a severe weather a flash flood devastated the place. Water heights height up to 3.50 meters have been achieved. Eight citizens and most of the livestock were victims of the disaster. In a state-organized effort the place was re-built by 3000 workers within 50 days. Of the disaster night remembers a memorial stone with the names of the eight victims. Every year a party takes place in memory of the unique solidarity action.

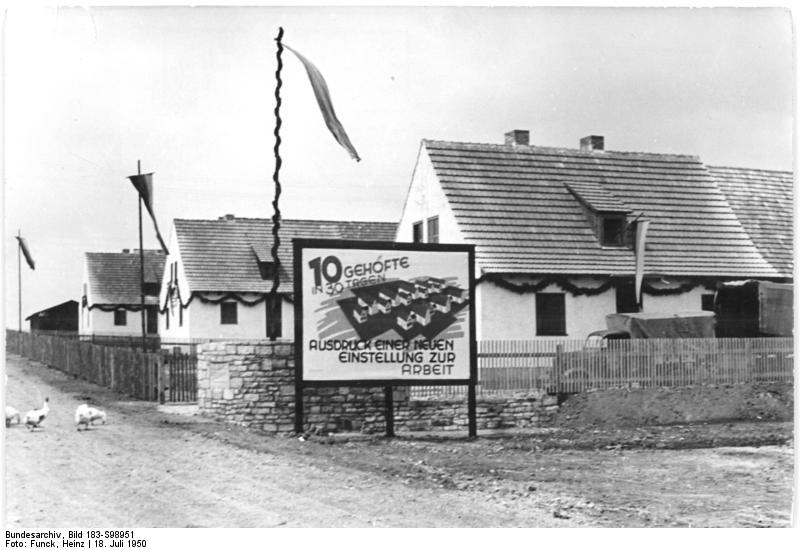
German Federal Archives, Bruchstedt, Information panel to new buildings
