= 1760 raid on Berlin =

1760 battle of the Third Silesian War

Coordinates: 52.5186°N 13.4081°E

Raid on Berlin
- Part of the Third Silesian War (Seven Years' War)
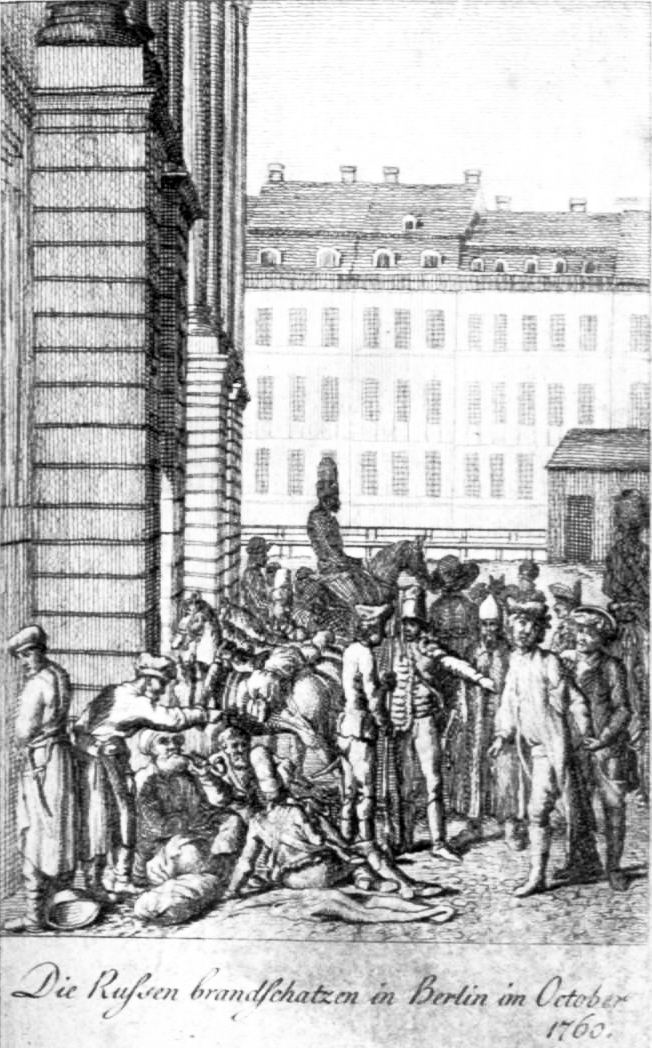
- Russians and Austrians devastate the arsenal in Berlin, October 1760
Date	3–12 October 1760
Location	Berlin, Prussia
Result	Berlin occupied for three days

Belligerents
Prussia	Russia; Austria

Commanders and leaders
(Kingdom of Prussia) Friedrich Wilhelm von Seydlitz (Kingdom of Prussia) Frederick Eugene of Württemburg (Kingdom of Prussia) Johann Dietrich von Hülsen	(Russian Empire) Zakhar Chernyshev (Russia) Gottlieb Heinrich Totleben (Habsburg monarchy) Count von Lacy

Strength
18,000	35,000: 20,000 Russians; 15,000 Austrians

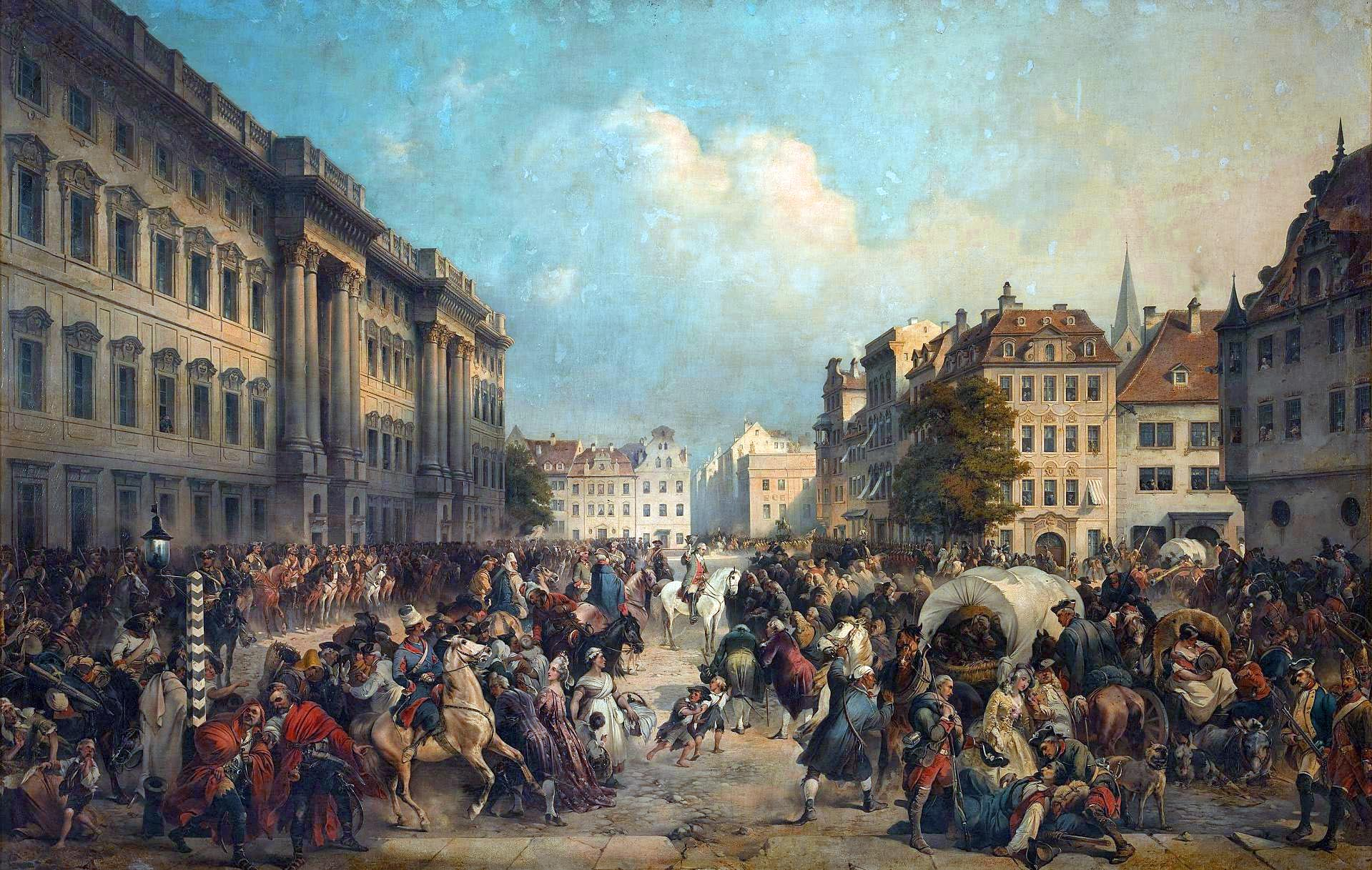
Capture of Berlin on 28 Sep. 1760 (O.S. date; painted by Alexander Kotzebue)

The Raid on Berlin took place in October 1760 during the Third Silesian War (part of the Seven Years' War) when Austrian and Russian forces occupied the Prussian capital of Berlin for three full days,—from October 9th until 12th. After raising money from the city, and with the approach of further Prussian reinforcements, the occupiers withdrew. There were later allegations that the Russian commander Count Tottleben had received a personal bribe from the Prussians to spare the city, and he was subsequently tried and found guilty of being a spy.

== Background ==
After a series of successes over Prussian forces in 1759, the following year proved to be a disappointment for the Allies as their invasion of Silesia had stalled, in spite of their overwhelming manpower, and they had been defeated at the Battle of Liegnitz in August 1760. However, the Prussian capital, Berlin had been left vulnerable by Frederick the Great's decision to concentrate his forces in Silesia. This led France to suggest that Russia could make a lightning raid on Berlin, the Prussian capital.

A smaller Austrian raid had briefly occupied the city in October 1757. The plan drawn up by the allies envisaged a feint towards Guben by the main army, which would allow a force under Heinrich Tottleben to detach itself and hurry northwards to strike at Berlin. This would be followed by a separate Austrian force under Count von Lacy. Large numbers of Cossacks and light cavalry were to take part in the raid to give it added speed.

== Occupation ==
=== Approach ===
Tottleben led a vanguard of 5,600 Russians which crossed the River Oder and attempted to take the city by a coup de main on 5 October. This attempt to surprise the city failed in the face of unexpected opposition. The governor of the city, General Hans Friedrich von Rochow wanted to withdraw in the face of the Russian threat, but the Prussian cavalry commander Friedrich Wilhelm von Seydlitz recovering from his wounds in the city, rallied the 2,000 defenders and managed to drive them back from the city gates.

Having received word of the danger to Berlin, Prince Eugene of Württemberg led his troops back from fighting the Swedes in Pomerania while a contingent from Saxony also arrived, boosting the defenders to around 18,000. The arrival of Lacy's Austrians swung the balance in favour of the Allies. The Austrians occupied Potsdam and Charlottenburg and in the face of these superior forces the Prussian defenders abandoned the city and retreated to nearby Spandau.

=== Occupation ===
Charlottenburg Palace was taken over by the occupiers.

On 9 October the city council decided to surrender the city formally to the Russians rather than the Austrians, as Austria was Prussia's bitterest enemy. The Russians immediately made a demand for 4 million Thalers in exchange for the protection of private property. A prominent merchant Johann Ernst Gotzkowsky took over the negotiations on behalf of Berlin, and was able to persuade Tottleben to reduce the levy to 1.5 million thalers. Meanwhile, the Austrians had forced their way into the city and occupied large parts of it.

The Austrians were more keen to exact revenge on the city because of Prussian behavior in occupied Saxony and on Austrian territory. The Russians, represented by First Major John O'Rourke, were concerned about improving their international reputation generally acted with greater restraint and emphasized respect towards the inhabitants. Several areas of the city were ransacked by the occupiers, and several royal palaces were burnt. Around 18,000 muskets and 143 cannons were seized. Austrian and Russian battle flags, captured during fighting, were retaken and around 1,200 prisoners of war were released. Frederick was particularly worried about the paintings and books in his palace: one of his agents reported to him that the Russians had taken some, but the murals and gilding were fine, and only a few of the marble statues knocked over. The Austrians took about 130 eleven- and twelve-year-old cadets captive, from the military school, and held them in Koenigsberg until the end of the war. The troops also destroyed parts of the foundry.

=== Withdrawal ===
A rumour that Frederick the Great was marching to the rescue of Berlin with his superior forces prompted the commanders to withdraw from the city as they had completed their major objectives. The occupiers withdrew from the city on 12 October, with the national contingents heading in separate directions. The Austrians under Lacy headed towards Saxony while the Russians rejoined their main army in the vicinity of Frankfurt. Once he had realised that Berlin had now been abandoned by the enemy, Frederick halted his rescue attempt and turned back to concentrate on Silesia and Saxony.

== Aftermath ==
Frederick was furious at the failure of his local forces and the inhabitants to actively resist the invaders. However, despite the loss of prestige, the raid was not especially significant for the military. In the wake of the occupation, the Prussians under Frederick fought, and narrowly won, the Battle of Torgau. Tottleben was later accused of being a Prussian spy, and was sentenced to death—only to receive a pardon from Catherine the Great.

In early 1762, Berlin came under the threat of more permanent and decisive occupation, but Frederick was spared by the Miracle of the House of Brandenburg.

In 1806, Berlin was captured by French forces during the Napoleonic Wars, leading to an occupation by a French garrison until 1813.

== See also ==
- 1757 raid on Berlin

== Bibliography ==
- Anderson, Fred. Crucible of War: The Seven Years' War and the Fate of Empire in British North America, 1754–1766. Faber and Faber, 2001
- Dull, Jonathan R. The French Navy and the Seven Years' War. University of Nebraska Press, 2005.
- Henderson, W. O. Studies in the Economic Policy of Frederick the Great. Routledge, 1963.
- Lawley, Robert Neville. General Seydlitz, a military biography. W. Clowes and Sons, 1852.
- Stone, David R. A military history of Russia: from Ivan the Terrible to the war in Chechnya. Praeger, 2006.
- Szabo, Franz A. J. The Seven Years War in Europe, 1756–1763. Pearson, 2008
- Velichko, Konstantin; Novitsky, Vasily; Schwarz, Alexey von; Apushkin, Vladimir; Schulz, Gustav von (1911). "Берлинъ" [Berlin]. Военная энциклопедия Сытина (in Russian). Vol. 4: Б – Бомба. Moscow: Типография Т-ва И. Д. Сытина. pp. 505–507.
