= Blankenburg, Unstrut-Hainich-Kreis =

Blankenburg
- Municipality
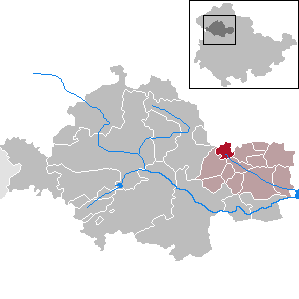
- Location of Blankenburg within Unstrut-Hainich-Kreis district
- Interactive map of Blankenburg
- Location within Germany Location within Thuringia
- Coordinates: 51°12′N 10°45′E
- Country: Germany
- State: Thuringia
- District: Unstrut-Hainich-Kreis
- Municipal assoc.: Bad Tennstedt

Government
  - Mayor (2022–28): Jörn Sola

Area
  - Total: 7.18 km^{2} (2.77 sq mi)
- Elevation: 272 m (892 ft)

Population (2025-12-31)
  - Total: 161
  - Density: 22.4/km^{2} (58.1/sq mi)
- Time zone: UTC+01:00 (CET)
  - Summer (DST): UTC+02:00 (CEST)
- Postal codes: 99955
- Dialling codes: 036043
- Vehicle registration: UH

Blankenburg (German pronunciation: [ˈblaŋkn̩bʊʁk]) is a municipality in the Unstrut-Hainich-Kreis district of Thuringia, Germany.
