= Kutzleben =

- Municipality
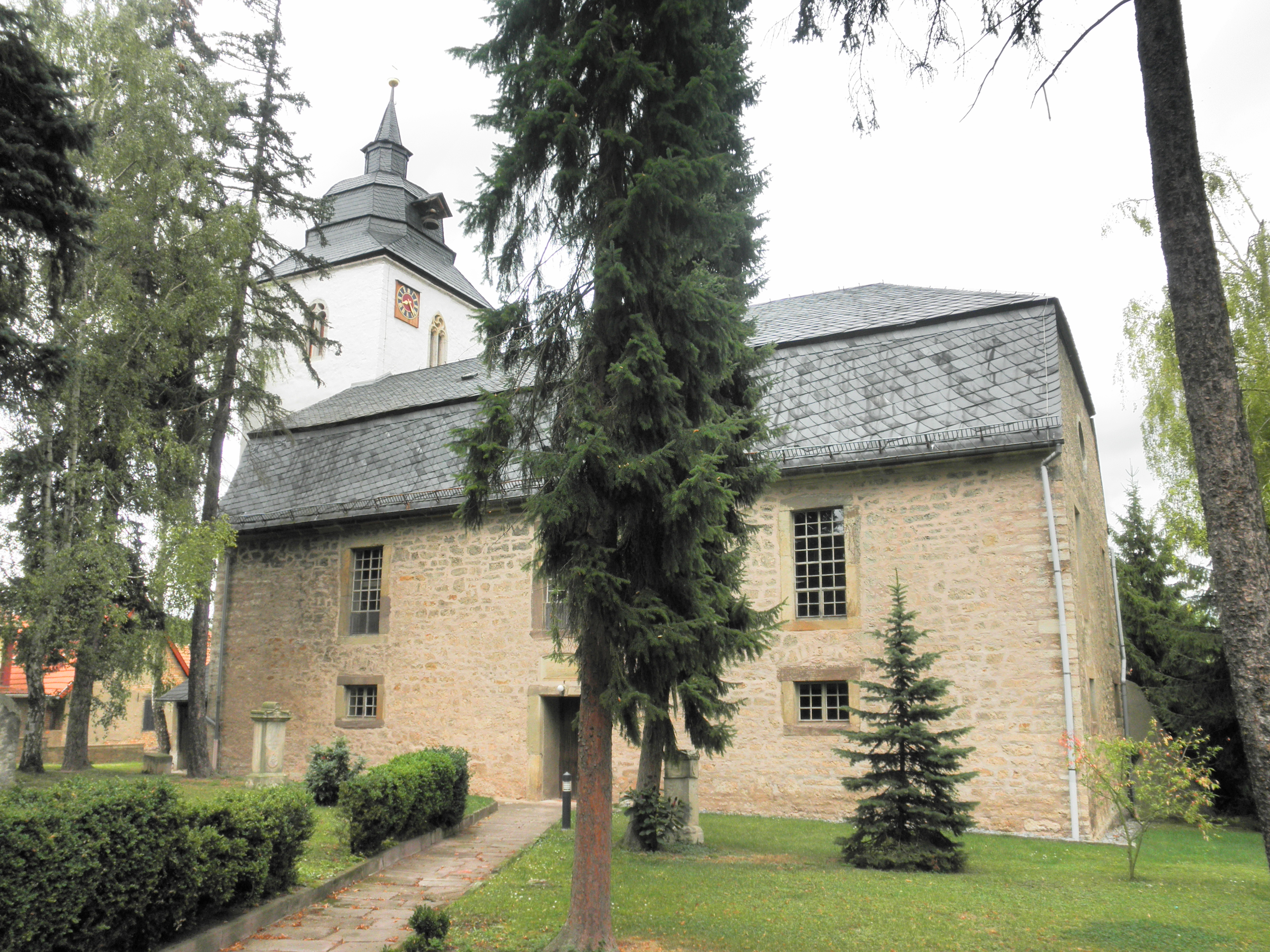
- Saint Peter Church in Kutzleben

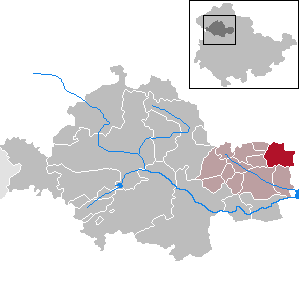
- Location of Kutzleben within Unstrut-Hainich-Kreis district
- Interactive map of Kutzleben
- Location within Germany Location within Thuringia
- Coordinates: 51°12′N 10°45′E
- Country: Germany
- State: Thuringia
- District: Unstrut-Hainich-Kreis
- Municipal assoc.: Bad Tennstedt

Government
  - Mayor (2021–27): Janine Schäfer

Area
  - Total: 18.34 km^{2} (7.08 sq mi)
- Elevation: 205 m (673 ft)

Population (2025-12-31)
  - Total: 607
  - Density: 33.1/km^{2} (85.7/sq mi)
- Time zone: UTC+01:00 (CET)
  - Summer (DST): UTC+02:00 (CEST)
- Postal codes: 99955
- Dialling codes: 036041
- Vehicle registration: UH

Kutzleben is a municipality in the Unstrut-Hainich-Kreis district of Thuringia, Germany.
