= Unstrut-Hainich-Kreis =

Coordinates: 51°10′N 10°30′E

- District
- Flag Coat of arms
- Country: Germany
- State: Thuringia
- Capital: Mühlhausen

Government
  - District admin.: Thomas Ahke (FW)

Area
  - Total: 931.70 km^{2} (359.73 sq mi)

Population (31 December 2024)
  - Total: 94,613
  - Density: 101.55/km^{2} (263.01/sq mi)
- Time zone: UTC+01:00 (CET)
  - Summer (DST): UTC+02:00 (CEST)
- Vehicle registration: UH, LSZ, MHL
- Website: www.landkreis-unstrut-hainich.de

Unstrut-Hainich-Kreis is a Kreis (district) in the north of Thuringia, Germany. Neighboring districts are (from the north clockwise) the districts Eichsfeld, Kyffhäuserkreis, Sömmerda, Gotha, Wartburgkreis and the district Werra-Meißner in Hesse.

== History ==
The district was created on 1 July 1994 by merging the two previous districts of Mühlhausen and Bad Langensalza.

== Partnerships ==
The district has a partnership with the Wetteraukreis in Hesse dating back to the German reunification of 1990. The district also has a partnership with the Lithuanian Ukmergė District Municipality.

== Geography ==
The district is named after the river Unstrut and a hill chain, the Hainich. The Hainich became the 13th national park of Germany in 1997.

== Coat of arms ==
The coat of arms combines the symbols of the historical territories which make up the area of the district. In the top left is the eagle of the city Mühlhausen, in the top right the lion as the symbol of the dukes of Thuringia. In the bottom left is the Wheel of Mainz, and the deer antler in the bottom right is the symbol of the Principality of Schwarzburg-Sondershausen.

== Towns and municipalities ==
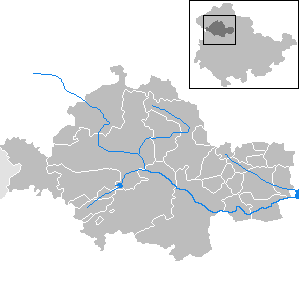
Clickable map of towns and municipalities in the district

Verwaltungsgemeinschaft-free towns
and municipalities
1. Bad Langensalza
2. Mühlhausen
3. Nottertal-Heilinger Höhen
1. Großvargula
2. Herbsleben
3. Kammerforst
4. Körner
5. Marolterode
6. Oppershausen
7. Südeichsfeld
8. Unstrut-Hainich
9. Unstruttal
10. Vogtei

Verwaltungsgemeinschaften
- 1. Bad Tennstedt
1. Bad Tennstedt^{1, 2}
2. Ballhausen
3. Blankenburg
4. Bruchstedt
5. Haussömmern
6. Hornsömmern
7. Kirchheilingen
8. Kutzleben
9. Mittelsömmern
10. Sundhausen
11. Tottleben
12. Urleben
^{1}seat of the Verwaltungsgemeinschaft; ^{2}town

== See also ==
- Royal Oak (Thuringia)
