= Siegfried of Ballhausen =

German priest and historian

Start of the Compendium in the autograph manuscript

Siegfried of Ballhausen (or Balnhusen) was a priest of Ballhausen who wrote a universal history in Latin. His history is known from two versions. The original Historia universalis was completed in 1304, but he later revised it and continued it down to 1306 under the title Compendium historiarum. The autograph manuscripts of both versions survive.

Both versions are divided into three parts. The first two are devoted to antiquity, mainly the Old Testament and New Testament periods. This includes a list of Roman emperors and kings of the Romans down to Albert I and a list of popes down to Benedict XI (Historia) or Clement V (Compendium). The third part covers Christian history. In this section, increasingly particular attention is paid to Siegfried's homeland of Thuringia. The works marks the beginning of the "Thuringian historical tradition".

In titling his first edition Historia universalis, Siegfried coined the term "universal history". In opting for a less ambitious title for his revision, he seemingly recognized that his work was not truly universal.

There is no complete modern edition, that of Oswald Holder-Egger being complete only from 1140 onwards.

== Bibliography ==
- Borst, Arno (1991) [1988]. Medieval Worlds: Barbarians, Heretics and Artists in the Middle Ages. Translated by Eric Hansen. University of Chicago Press.
- Holder-Egger, Oswald, ed. (1880). "Sifridi presbyteri de Balnhusin Historia Universalis et Compendium Historiarum". Monumenta Germaniae Historica. Vol. Scriptores 25. Hanover. pp. 679–718.
- Kälble, Mathias (2010). "Siegfried of Ballhausen". In Graeme Dunphy (ed.). Encyclopedia of the Medieval Chronicle. Vol. 2. Brill. pp. 1357–1358.
