= Hellmuth Lucius von Stoedten =

German diplomat

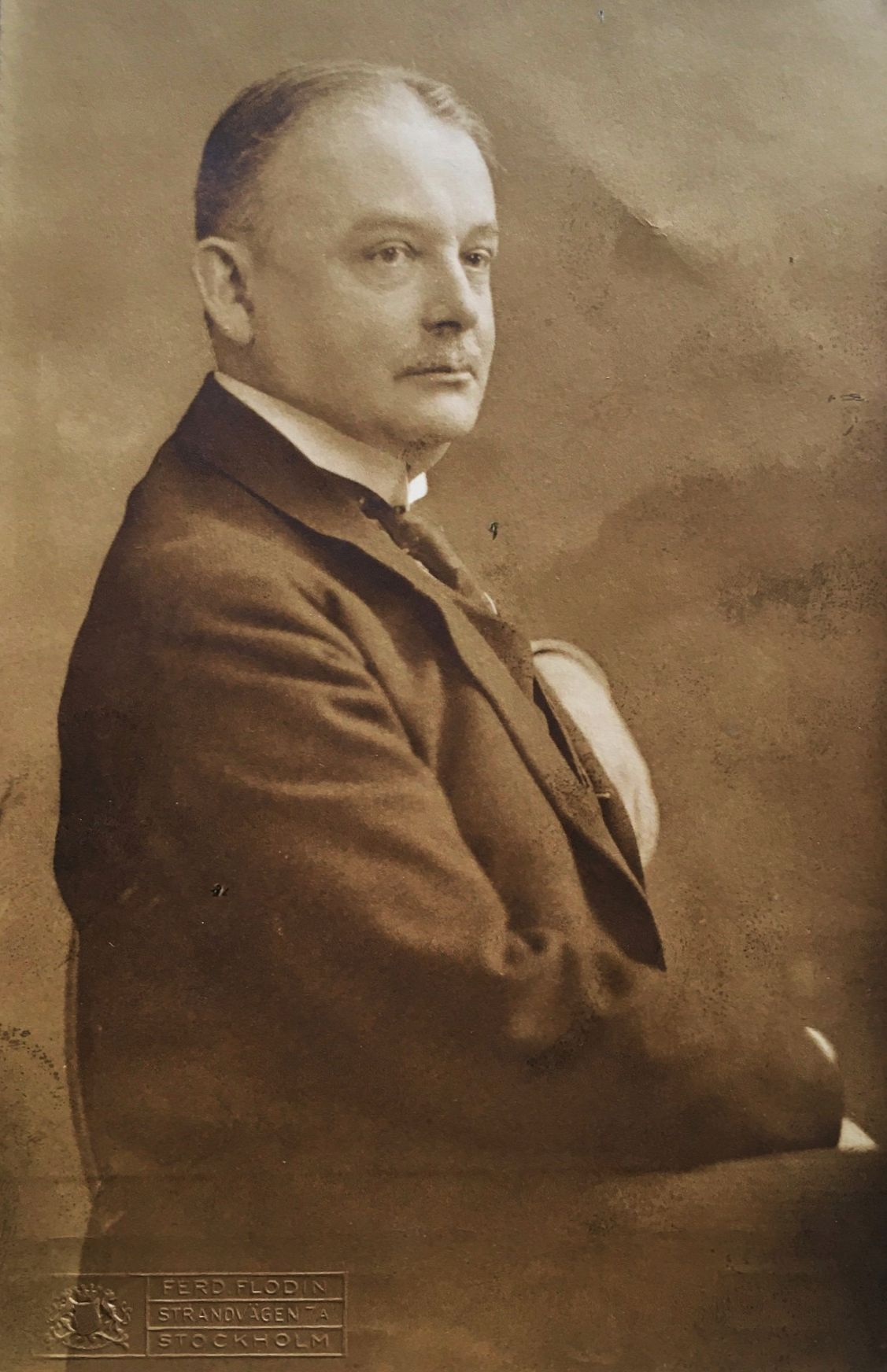
Hellmuth Lucius von Stoedten

Hellmuth Eduard Ferdinand Lucius von Stoedten (14 July 1869, Estate Klein Ballhausen, Thuringia – 14 November 1934, Berlin) was a German diplomat during World War I.

== Early life ==
His father was Robert Lucius, Prussian Minister of Agriculture, and a confidant of Otto von Bismarck.

== Career ==
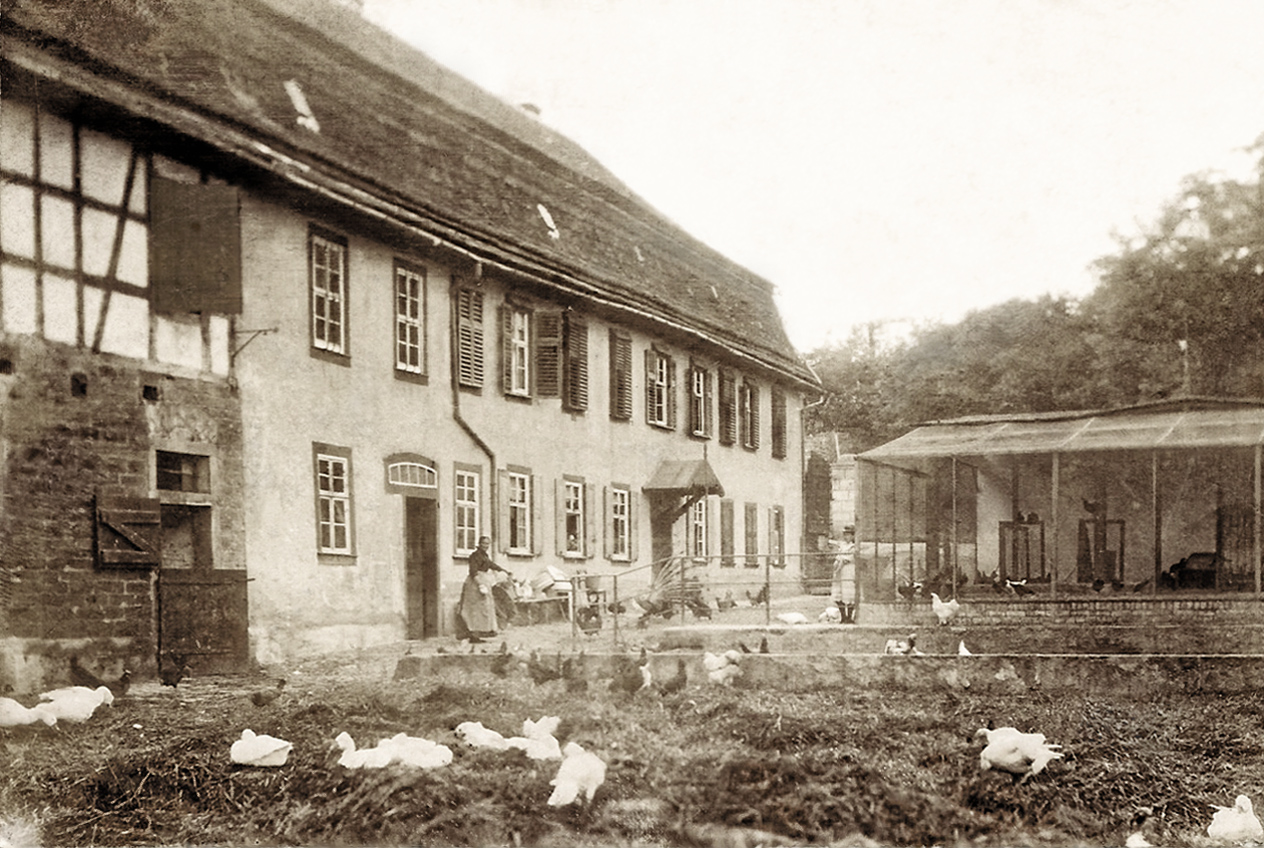
Gut Stödten um 1900

Hellmuth was initially attaché in Paris 1898–1900 and till 1906 secretary. In 1911 he was a counsellor in St. Petersburg. From 1914 he was a diplomatic agent and consul general in Durazzo, Albania. From 1915 to 1920 he was the German ambassador in Stockholm. Von Stoedten was very instrumental in the preservation of Swedish neutrality in World War I. During the war he had a different view on the German policy towards Russia after the Russian Revolution than the military leadership. Erich Ludendorff accused the messenger even of disloyalty. However, Lucius was protected by the German Foreign Office. In addition to other embassies in Stockholm he was largely responsible for the contacts with Alexander Protopopov, and the Russian opposition and revolutionaries. As such, he played a role in 1917 in the transport of Lenin from the German sphere of influence over Sweden to Russia. Between 1921 and 1927 he was envoy in The Hague till he became sick.

== Personal life ==
On 9 April 1896, He married Baroness Bertha von Stumm-Halberg (22 February 1876 – 30 January 1949), daughter of industrialist Baron Carl Ferdinand von Stumm-Halberg. Together, they were the parents of two daughter:

- Irma Ida Ellen Lucius von Stoedten (1897–1976)
- Jutta Elisabeth Ida Lucius von Stoedten (1900–1959)

Hellmuth and Bertha divorced in 1907, and his ex-wife married Adalbert von Francken-Sierstorpff in 1912.

He was the owner of a manor in Stödten Straußfurt, inherited the family estate Ballhausen after the death of his eldest brother Otto Baron Lucius of Ballhausen (1932). Since then Hellmuth was the "Baron Lucius of Ballhausen".

=== Patron of the arts ===
Lucius von Stoedten is known a patron of the arts. By Auguste Rodin, with whom he was friends, he acquired the marble sculpture "The Kiss". Gerhart Hauptmann also counted among his friends. Von Stoedten possessed an important collection of letters of Heinrich Heine. Rainer Maria Rilke dedicated Lucius von Stoedten in 1922 an opportunity poem that led Martin Heidegger to the question: "Why poet?"
