= Marolterode =

- Municipality
- Coat of arms

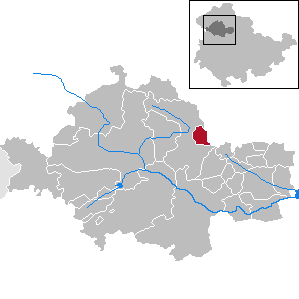
- Location of Marolterode within Unstrut-Hainich-Kreis district
- Interactive map of Marolterode
- Location within Germany Location within Thuringia
- Coordinates: 51°14′N 10°41′E
- Country: Germany
- State: Thuringia
- District: Unstrut-Hainich-Kreis

Government
  - Mayor (2022–28): Joachim Haase

Area
  - Total: 6.34 km^{2} (2.45 sq mi)
- Elevation: 278 m (912 ft)

Population (2025-12-31)
  - Total: 289
  - Density: 45.6/km^{2} (118/sq mi)
- Time zone: UTC+01:00 (CET)
  - Summer (DST): UTC+02:00 (CEST)
- Postal codes: 99994
- Dialling codes: 036021
- Vehicle registration: UH

Marolterode (German pronunciation: [maʁɔltəˈʁoːdə]) is a municipality in the Unstrut-Hainich-Kreis district of Thuringia, Germany. Located just east of another small town, Schlotheim, it is placed in between Bundesstraßen (federal roads) 249 and 84.
