= Ballhausen =

- Municipality
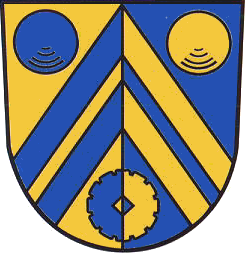
- Coat of arms

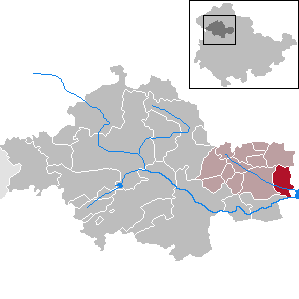
- Location of Ballhausen within Unstrut-Hainich-Kreis district
- Interactive map of Ballhausen
- Location within Germany Location within Thuringia
- Coordinates: 51°8′N 10°52′E
- Country: Germany
- State: Thuringia
- District: Unstrut-Hainich-Kreis
- Municipal assoc.: Bad Tennstedt

Government
  - Mayor (2022–28): Steffen Dähnert

Area
  - Total: 14.72 km^{2} (5.68 sq mi)
- Elevation: 162 m (531 ft)

Population (2025-12-31)
  - Total: 821
  - Density: 55.8/km^{2} (144/sq mi)
- Time zone: UTC+01:00 (CET)
  - Summer (DST): UTC+02:00 (CEST)
- Postal codes: 99955
- Dialling codes: 036041
- Vehicle registration: UH

Ballhausen is a municipality in the Unstrut-Hainich-Kreis district of Thuringia, Germany.

== People ==
- Siegfried of Ballhausen (fl. 1304–1306), Thuringian priest and historian
- Robert Lucius von Ballhausen (1835–1914), Prussian politician and Prussian agriculture minister
- Hellmuth Lucius von Stoedten (1869–1934), German diplomat
