= Mittelsömmern =

- Municipality
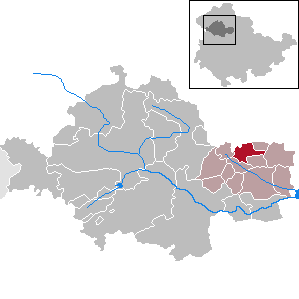
- Location of Mittelsömmern within Unstrut-Hainich-Kreis district
- Interactive map of Mittelsömmern
- Location within Germany Location within Thuringia
- Coordinates: 51°12′23″N 10°48′48″E
- Country: Germany
- State: Thuringia
- District: Unstrut-Hainich-Kreis
- Municipal assoc.: Bad Tennstedt

Government
  - Mayor (2020–26): Thomas Drengenburg

Area
  - Total: 10.08 km^{2} (3.89 sq mi)
- Elevation: 290 m (950 ft)

Population (2025-12-31)
  - Total: 189
  - Density: 18.7/km^{2} (48.6/sq mi)
- Time zone: UTC+01:00 (CET)
  - Summer (DST): UTC+02:00 (CEST)
- Postal codes: 99955
- Dialling codes: 036041
- Vehicle registration: UH
- Website: www.badtennstedt.de

Mittelsömmern is a municipality in the Unstrut-Hainich-Kreis district of Thuringia, Germany.
