= Urleben =

- Municipality
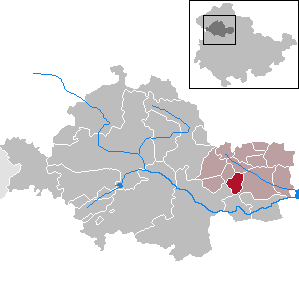
- Location of Urleben within Unstrut-Hainich-Kreis district
- Interactive map of Urleben
- Location within Germany Location within Thuringia
- Coordinates: 51°09′N 10°47′E
- Country: Germany
- State: Thuringia
- District: Unstrut-Hainich-Kreis
- Municipal assoc.: Bad Tennstedt

Government
  - Mayor (2022–28): Ronald Schmöller

Area
  - Total: 8.13 km^{2} (3.14 sq mi)
- Elevation: 211 m (692 ft)

Population (2025-12-31)
  - Total: 369
  - Density: 45.4/km^{2} (118/sq mi)
- Time zone: UTC+01:00 (CET)
  - Summer (DST): UTC+02:00 (CEST)
- Postal codes: 99955
- Dialling codes: 036041
- Vehicle registration: UH
- Website: www.badtennstedt.de

Urleben is a municipality in the Unstrut-Hainich-Kreis district of Thuringia, Germany.
