= Sundhausen =

- Municipality
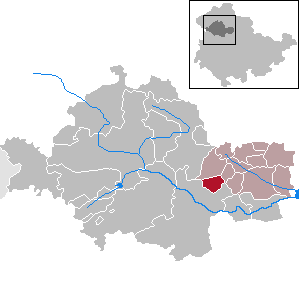
- Location of Sundhausen within Unstrut-Hainich-Kreis district
- Interactive map of Sundhausen
- Location within Germany Location within Thuringia
- Coordinates: 51°10′N 10°43′E
- Country: Germany
- State: Thuringia
- District: Unstrut-Hainich-Kreis
- Municipal assoc.: Bad Tennstedt

Government
  - Mayor (2020–26): Christopher Kaufmann

Area
  - Total: 8.06 km^{2} (3.11 sq mi)
- Elevation: 241 m (791 ft)

Population (2025-12-31)
  - Total: 362
  - Density: 44.9/km^{2} (116/sq mi)
- Time zone: UTC+01:00 (CET)
  - Summer (DST): UTC+02:00 (CEST)
- Postal codes: 99947
- Dialling codes: 036043
- Vehicle registration: UH
- Website: www.sundhausen1.de

Sundhausen is a municipality in the Unstrut-Hainich-Kreis district of Thuringia, Germany.
