= Royal Oak (Thuringia) =

Natural monument in Thuringia, Germany

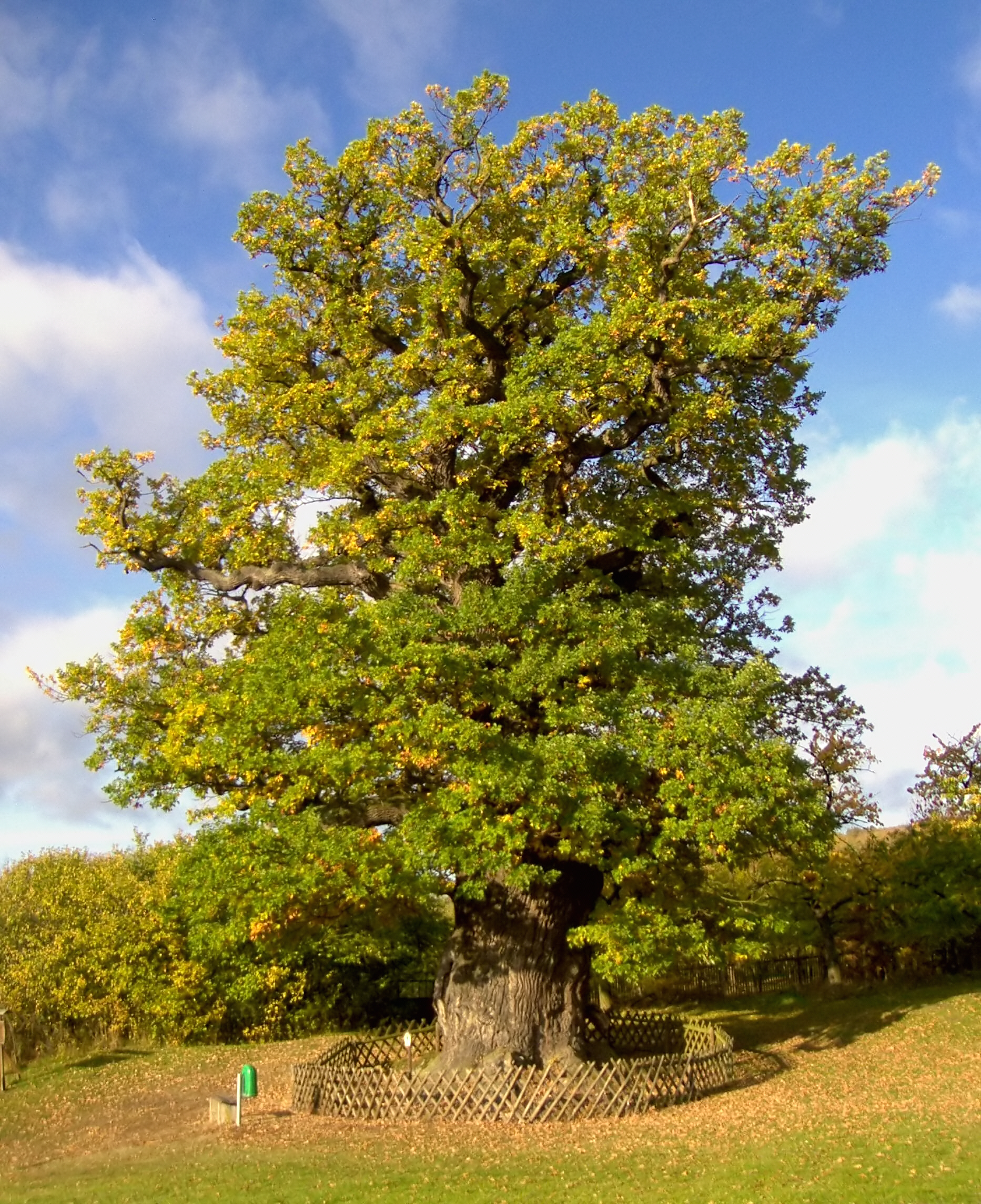
Royal oak in October 2006

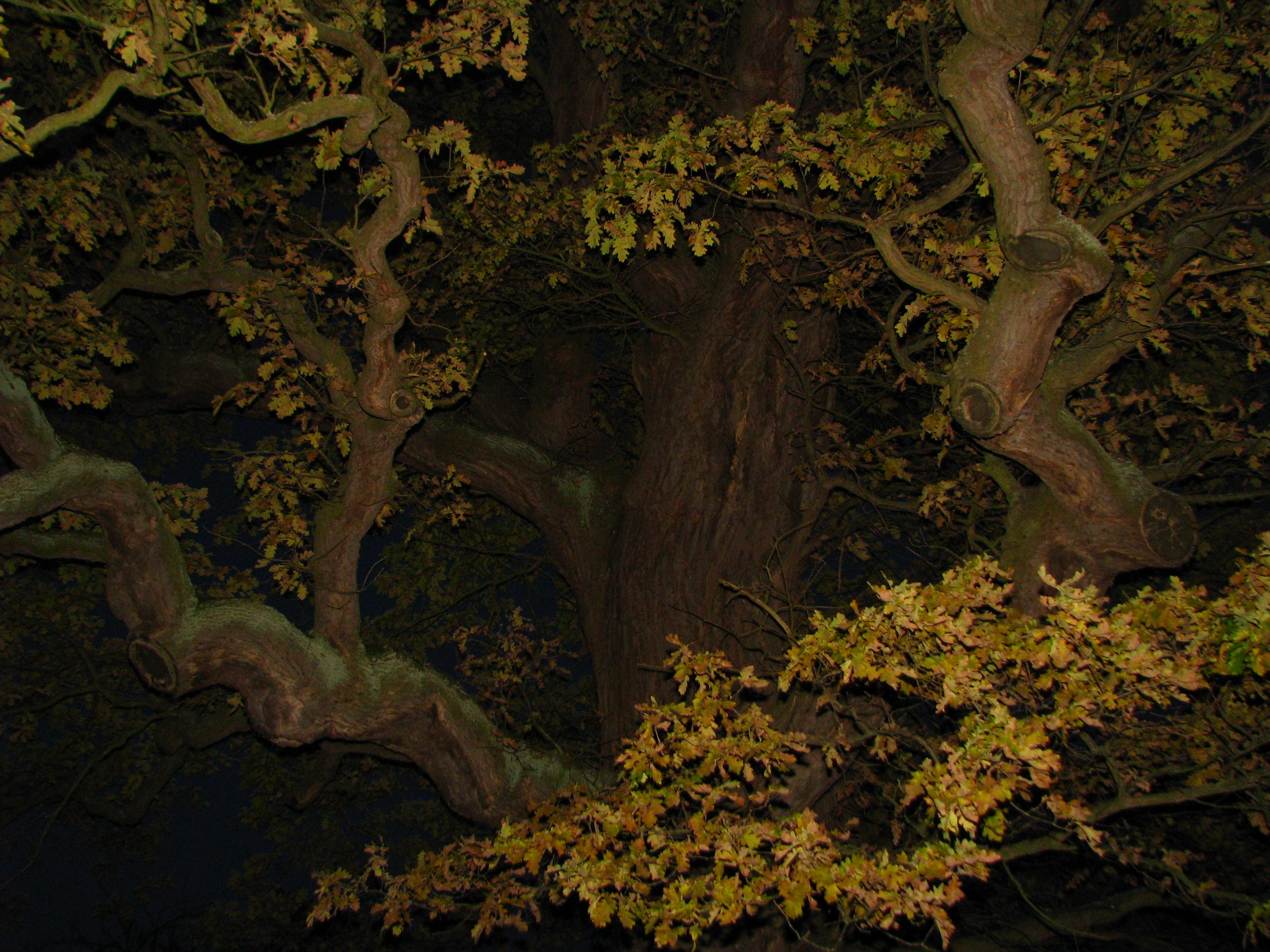
Detail of the Volkenroda royal oak by night

The Royal Oak (also known as the Big Oak, Millennial Oak or Volkenroda Oak) is a natural monument on the outskirts of Volkenroda, a district of Körner, in the Unstrut-Hainich-Kreis in Thuringia, Germany. The English oak (Quercus robur) is more than 600 years old and has a trunk circumference of about 9.5 meters. The presumed age of the oak was determined by taking drill cores from the trunk and ring counts from a broken branch. It was previously assumed that the location of the oak was an old Germanic Thing site. However, more recent research suggests that the oak grew in a medieval Hutewald forest.

Nowadays, Pentecost services are held at the Royal Oak church services are held at Pentecost. It is owned by the municipality of Körner and has been professionally restored several times over the past hundred years.

== Location ==
The oak stands about 300 meters northeast of Volkenroda, slightly south of the Volkenroder Wald at an altitude of about 285 meters above sea level. It is located on Keuper-loam terrain sloping south towards the Notter, on the so-called Pfingstrasen, an old Flurbezeichnung, about three kilometers northwest of Körner and ten kilometers northeast of Mühlhausen. The oak is surrounded by a hunter's fence to protect the root area from trampling by visitors. To the south, the road to Obermehler, a former Handels- and Heerstraße, leads past the oak. On the other side of the road is the Deutsche Eiche inn.

== History ==
=== Early history ===
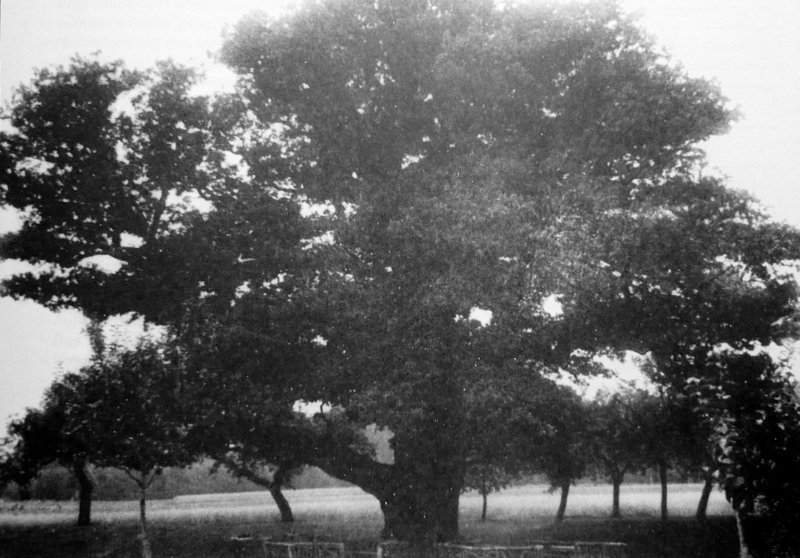
View map (around 1900)

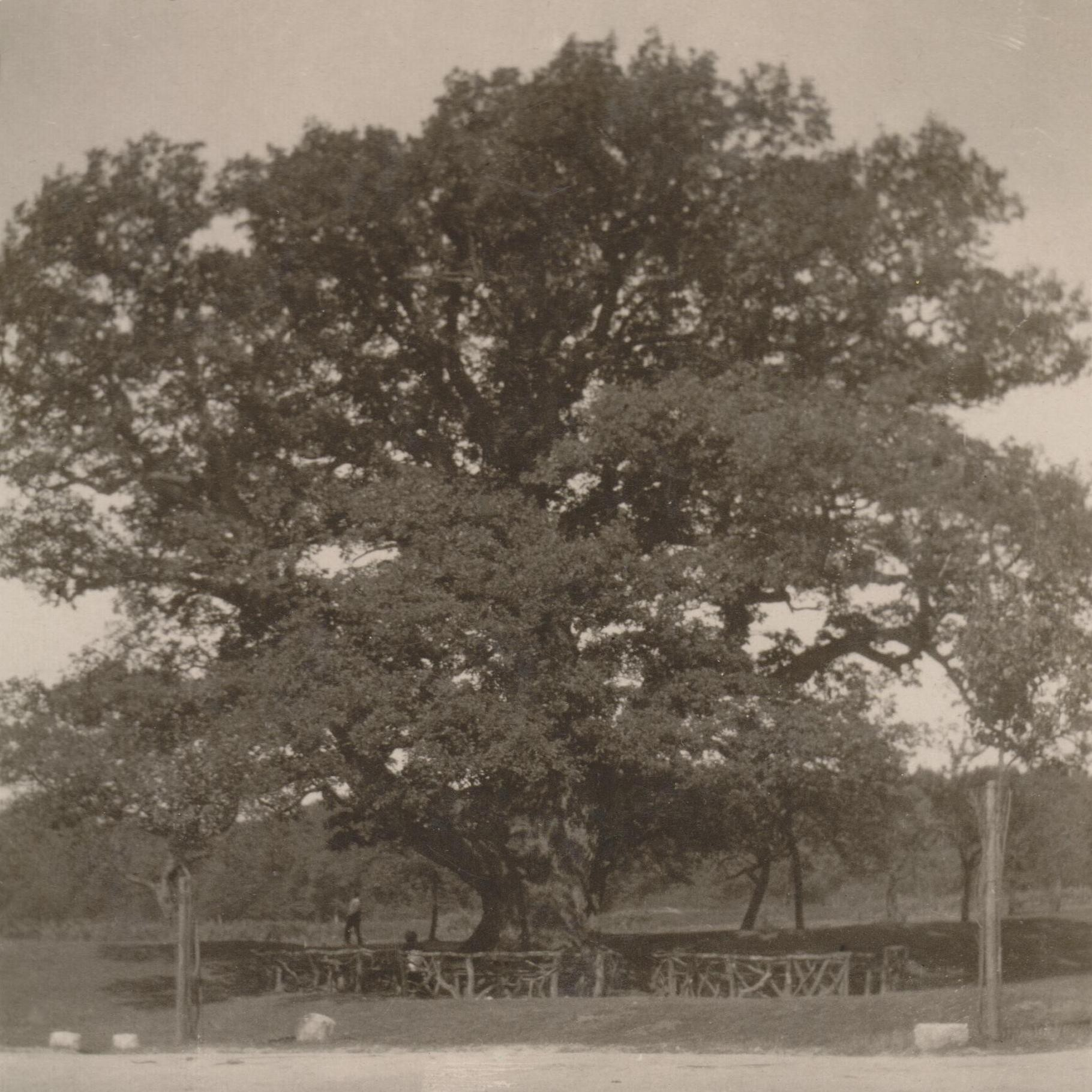
View (around 1907)

The royal oak is said to have been mentioned in documents as early as the 12th century in connection with the Volkenroda monastery. However, the latest age studies cast doubt on whether the oak mentioned is actually today's royal oak or a predecessor oak of the same name.

About 150 meters away from the King's Oak once stood the so-called Devil's Oak. This was the much older and, with a circumference of over eleven meters, the stronger of the two oaks. According to legend, it was given its name in the 8th century as it was previously assumed that the two oaks were the remains of a pagan oak grove and a site for a thing. For example, Carl Eduard Duke of Saxe-Coburg and Gotha, the last reigning Duke of Saxe-Coburg and Gotha, wrote about the oaks in Volkenroda in 1903 in the local history journal Aus den Coburg-Gothaischen Landen, issue 5:

Even in ancient times, when the villages of the area, Konre [Körner], Melre [Obermehler], Buten [Pöthen], were established, there may have been a sacred grove in Volkolroth [Volkenroda], where Germanic paganism cultivated its worship of the gods. Part of the oak grove stood for a long time in Christian times. The huge trees no longer shaded the sacrificial feast and bloody sacrificial stone, the branches no longer held pale horse skulls and sacred weapons, but at their feet were colorful fairs, fairgrounds and folk festivals at Pentecost time.

Today, however, they are regarded as the last remaining trees of a Hutewald from the heyday of the Cistercian Volkenroda Monastery.

According to tradition, an elderly woman and her goat found shelter from the marauding warriors and robbers in the hollow trunk of this oak tree during the Thirty Years' War. In 1863, the Holstein forestry official Eduard Mielck wrote in Die Riesen der Pflanzenwelt: "Ferner misst die bei Volckenrode im Herzogthum Gotha stehende 'Teufelseiche' zwei Fuß über der Erde 29 Fuß Umkreis." In 1871, the oak was struck by lightning, fell over and perished on 2 September 1871 during the peace celebrations (victory over France in the Franco-Prussian War).

=== The royal oak replaces the devil's oak ===
After the end of the Devil's Oak at the end of the 19th century, the Royal Oak was preserved. Due to its growth habit and state of preservation, it was regarded as a replacement tree for the Devil's Oak. In 1884, the first major damage to the crown occurred when a large branch broke off, leaving a 63 centimeter knothole. The hole was covered and closed 15 years later.

=== Maintenance work ===
In 1903, the first protective measures were carried out on the oak tree. With the help of two ship anchor chains of 14.50 meters in length, rings, bolts and round iron, the master blacksmith Gebert from the neighbouring village of Körner hung the longest branch, which extended almost horizontally at a height of about two meters, attached both chains to two iron anchors with 2.5 centimeter thick round bars, which he placed around a steeply rising main branch at a height of about twelve meters to secure it. From there they led to the outer end of the horizontal branch. In 1955, the anchor chain broke due to age and the heavy weight of the branch. This broke off and left a large knothole in the trunk. The anchor chains were hanging down on both sides of the steeply rising branch around which they led.

In the same year, the oak underwent extensive restoration. On 7 April 1955, the stump of the branch was sawn off, the wounds were sealed with latex and the hollow trunk was given a cement seal, as was customary at the time. The cut surface of the branch is completely covered with bark, but the hole in between is still visible. During restoration work in 1991, a bottle was found in a branch stump with a document about the repair of July 4, 1955 by master carpenters Emil Haase, Siegfried Groß and Heinz Westerheyde. The document states that the remains of broken branches were sawn off and the wounds were sealed with latex. In the 1970s, restoration work was carried out twice on behalf of the council of the district, nature conservation department. Hans Gerhard Zimmermann first treated the breakage of a strong branch. A few years later, Oskar Haase and his son-in-law repaired the damage caused by several broken branches. From 1983, the state no longer felt responsible for the oak tree. In June 1989, lightning left a mark on the north-east side of the tree. A strip of bark about ten centimetres wide had been blown off from the top of the crown to the ground. Initially, no further damage to the tree was visible. Around three weeks later, an eastern, four-metre main branch, which had formed a large part of the main crown and had also been struck by lightning, broke off. This resulted in the loss of around a third of the crown volume.

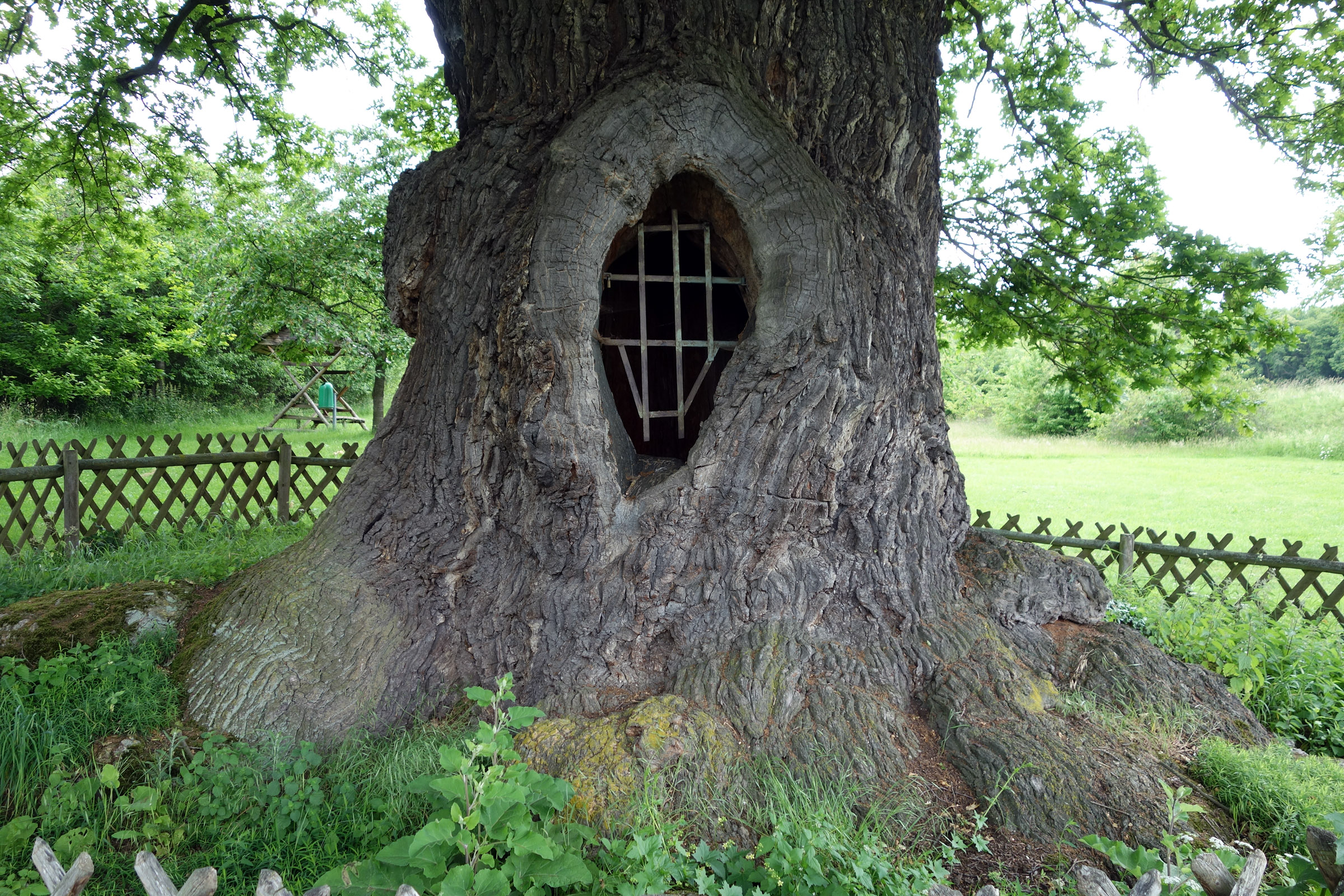
Master view

=== Comprehensive restoration in 1991 ===
After German reunification, urgently needed tree care measures were carried out in 1991 as part of the Thuringia aid program. Forestry experts from Hessen, who were active in the Hessen-Hilfe für Thüringen campaign, classified the oak as a treasure. In April and May 1991, forester from the Jesberg forestry office, Schwalm-Eder-Kreis were busy working together with the forester Gerhard Köhler in Volkenroda to restore the oak tree. The costs were borne by the Hessian forestry administration. They removed rotten areas and closed wounds so that no bacteria or fungus spores could penetrate. The rotten and fungus-infested wood was removed or scraped out in places, gedexelt, the rest smoothed and the surface treated with fungicidal agents. The experts removed the cement filling inserted in the hollow trunk in 1955. It had been recognized that such false seals are rather harmful to the tree, as the wood can rot more on the concrete seal. They removed the layer of wood in the hollow trunk that had been damaged by the fungal attack. They cut out hollow branches so that no water could remain there, removed the rotten core and closed the branch hole from 1955 with grids. The trunk now has three openings, one close to the ground and two more at the top. This creates a chimney effect, which stimulates the extraction of moist air. Inside the trunk, the wood can now dry out more easily, making further fungal infestation more difficult. The two anchor chains from 1903, which had been hanging loosely in the crown since the branch broke in 1955 and had grown into the upper part, were removed to reduce the risk of another lightning strike. As in 1955, the helpers deposited a bottle with a restoration certificate in the tree. The broken strong branches were cut into slices and sold as souvenirs in the Deutsche Eiche restaurant. At the end of the restoration work, the forestry superintendent Horst Siebert and Ronald Kaiser, head of the environmental department of the Mühlhausen district administration, planted a new oak tree about 40 meters east of the Königseiche on behalf of the Hessian Forestry Administration. As the Unity Oak, it is intended to be a monument to German reunification.

=== Protection ===
Although the oak is one of the oldest and thickest oaks in Germany, no evidence of the tree being protected could be found at the district's Lower Nature Conservation Authority. This is surprising given the size and importance of the oak. In order to end this legal limbo, an application was made on February 21, 2005, for the tree to be placed under protection, which came into force on March 28, 2005. Since then, the tree has been considered a natural monument. In future, the district's nature conservation authority will bear the costs of repairing damage to the oak. The tree will be inspected by the authority twice a year, in winter and when it is in leaf. Damage to the oak can be punished with fines of up to 50,000 euros.

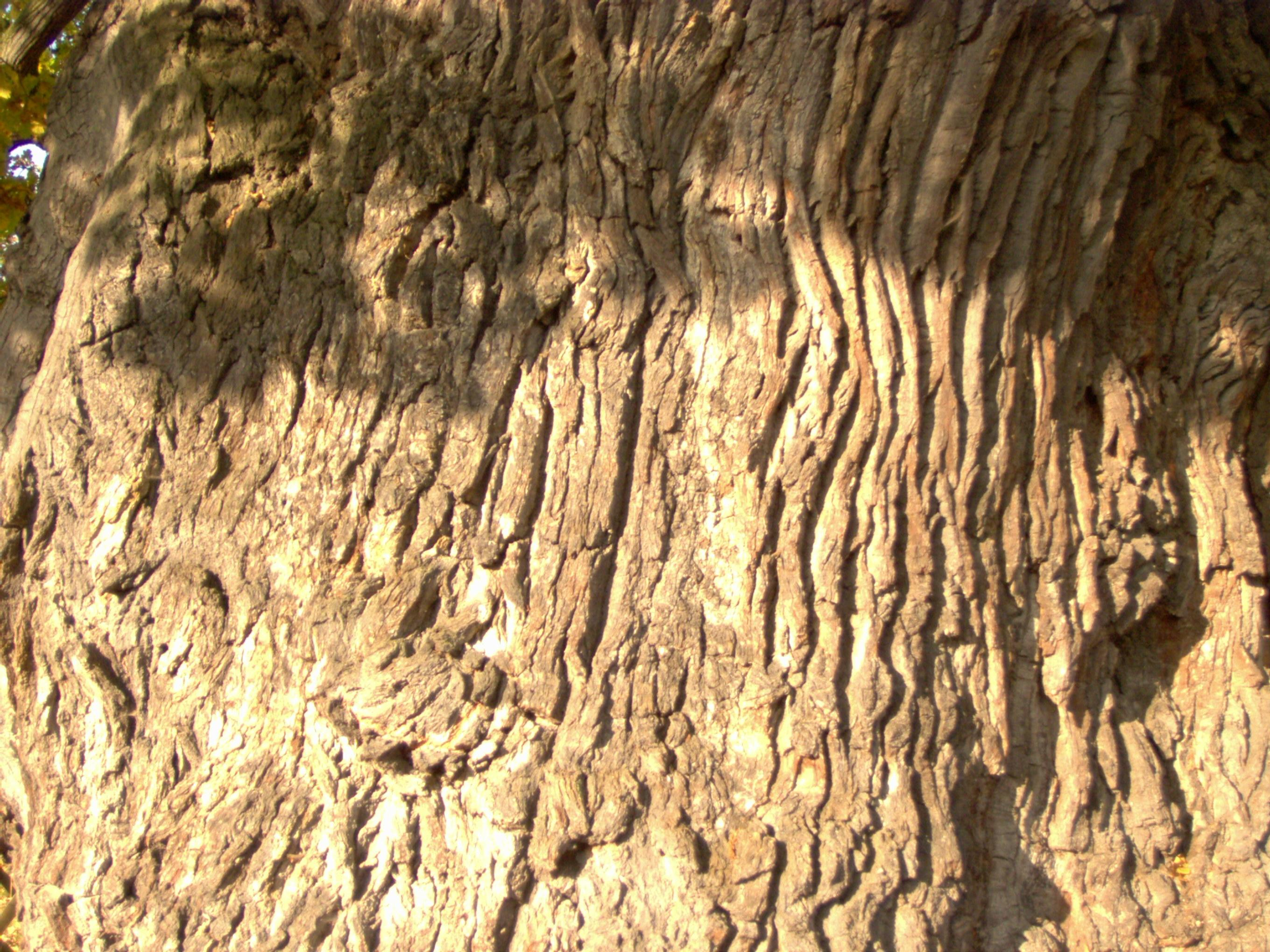
Bark of the royal oak

== Description ==
It is not known how the royal oak got its name. The name is said to come from its majestic growth in earlier years, when it stood like a king on a meadow. It was deeply branched with a broad crown and the characteristics of a free-growing Hutewalddeiche, the fruit of which was used to fatten grazing cattle. It shows the typical characteristics of English oaks. The base of the trunk is bulging and broad, the bark on the trunk is deeply furrowed, the branches of the crown are gnarled and twisted. The bark is still deeply furrowed even in the upper crown area, which only occurs in very old oaks. Until now, the oak was considered to be the remains of an early historical oak grove and a site where, according to Germanic law Germanic law and Gerichtsversammlungen, so-called Things, were held. Thorough age determinations in recent years and a well-documented development of the oak make a new historical classification possible. It is now the only remaining tree in the Hutewald forest from the heyday of the Cistercian monastery Volkenroda.

The oak is about 23 meters high with a crown diameter of about 16 meters. The crown is without any crown protection. The top of the tree is disheveled, some strong branches are broken out or pruned, especially in the lower crown area. This gives the crown an asymmetrical appearance. The tree has probably been fully exposed to wind and storms for centuries. Some of the broken branches left holes in the trunk, some of which have completely grown over again. The hole created in 1955 when the largest branch was broken out is closed with an iron grate. The trunk is completely hollow, but still closed. The oak makes a very vitality impression. The German Tree Archive counts it among the nationally significant trees (NBB), whereby the trunk circumference at a height of one meter serves as the most important selection criterion.

Next to the oak tree is a wooden information board with the following inscription:

Königseiche
Alter: 900–1200 Jahre
Umfang: 9,30 Meter
Sanierung Mai 1991
Durchmesser: 3,00 Meter

[Royal Oak
Age: 900–1,200 years
Circumference: 9.30 meters
Restored May 1991
Diameter: 3.00 meters]

=== Events and church services ===
The oak tree on the so-called Pfingstrasen was the center of many events and festivals in earlier years. Until 1945, celebrations were held under the oak tree at weekends and at Whitsun. Even after the World War II, the inn Deutsche Eiche on the opposite side of the street hosted numerous festivals with a band under the oak tree at weekends. For example, on the first Sunday in August 1991, a family afternoon with music was held with over 400 guests. On August 16, 1991, a ecumenical Gottesdienst mit einigen hundert Teilnehmern unter der Königseiche. Am Himmelfahrtstag 1992 hielt der Pfarrer von Körner in Fortsetzung der bis 1945 bestehenden Tradition unter der Eiche für etwa 600 Gläubige einen Gottesdienst, which has been repeated annually ever since.

=== Trunk diameter ===
Trunk circumference at a height of 1.70 meters
Year of measurement	Scope	Growth per year
1821	5,65 m	––
1831	6,90 m	12,5 cm
1841	6,99 m	0,9 cm
1851	7,23 m	2,4 cm
1881	7,87 m	2,1 cm
1901	8,10 m	1,2 cm
1921	8,40 m	1,5 cm
1941	8,78 m	1,9 cm
2001	9,50 m	1,2 cm

The thickness growth of the oak is very well documented. Since 1821, the trunk has been regularly measured at a height of 1.7 meters, the so-called man height. Scharf compiled these values in 1923 from old forestry documents, which Engel supplemented in 1942. The first value from 1821 with a trunk circumference of 5.65 meters is clearly too low compared to the later measurements, otherwise the circumference would have increased by 1.25 meters in ten years. Hans-Jürgen Tillich, who attempted to determine the age using various methods in the 1990s, therefore suspects that the first measurement was incorrect. The measurements in Leipziger Zoll probably involved a conversion or transcription error. This value was therefore not taken into account for further investigations. In 1831 the trunk circumference was 6.90, in 2001 9.50 meters. In 170 years, the trunk circumference has increased by 2.60 meters, which corresponds to an annual increase of about 1.53 centimeters. The Royal Oak has grown somewhat more slowly in the last 200 years than most of its kind of comparable size, where the annual increase in circumference is around 1.8 centimetres up to 2 centimeters

The measurements since 1821 show that the thickness growth of the oak is subject to fluctuations. Between 1841 and 1851, for example, it grew 2.4 centimetres per year, but in the previous ten years, 1831 to 1841, it only grew 0.9 centimetres. These intermittent growth spurts can be partly explained by the fact that in certain phases not only the actual cambium grows, but also the bark cambium (phellem) is involved in the thickness growth. This causes the outer bark to tear open.

The tree has been measured at various heights in recent years. In 2002, the German Tree Archive gave a circumference of 9.51 meters at the point of the smallest diameter (waist), still below the knothole, which was created in 1955 by breaking out the formerly strongest branch, and in 1995 at a height of 9.70 meters. The oak is thus one of the ten strongest naturally grown single-stem oaks in Germany. The forest scientist Hans Joachim Fröhlich gave a circumference of 9.90 meters for the year 1994 at a height of 1.3 meters, the point of the so-called breast height diameter (BHD). In 2005, the Lower Nature Conservation Authority also recorded a circumference of 9.90 meters for the same measured height. Anette Lenzing gave a circumference of 10.00 meters in 2005 in Gerichtslinden und Thingplätze in Deutschland, also measured at breast height. Greatoaks, a compilation by Jeroen Philippona and Jeroen Pater on the largest oaks in Europe gives a breast height circumference of 9.60 meters.

=== Age ===
Since the oldest wood is missing in the center of the trunk, neither a complete annual ring count, for example with the help of a drill core extraction or a drilling resistance measurement using a resistograph, nor an age determination via the content of radioactive carbon (radiocarbon dating, also called 14C dating) is possible. The age of the oak can therefore only be determined approximately using various methods.

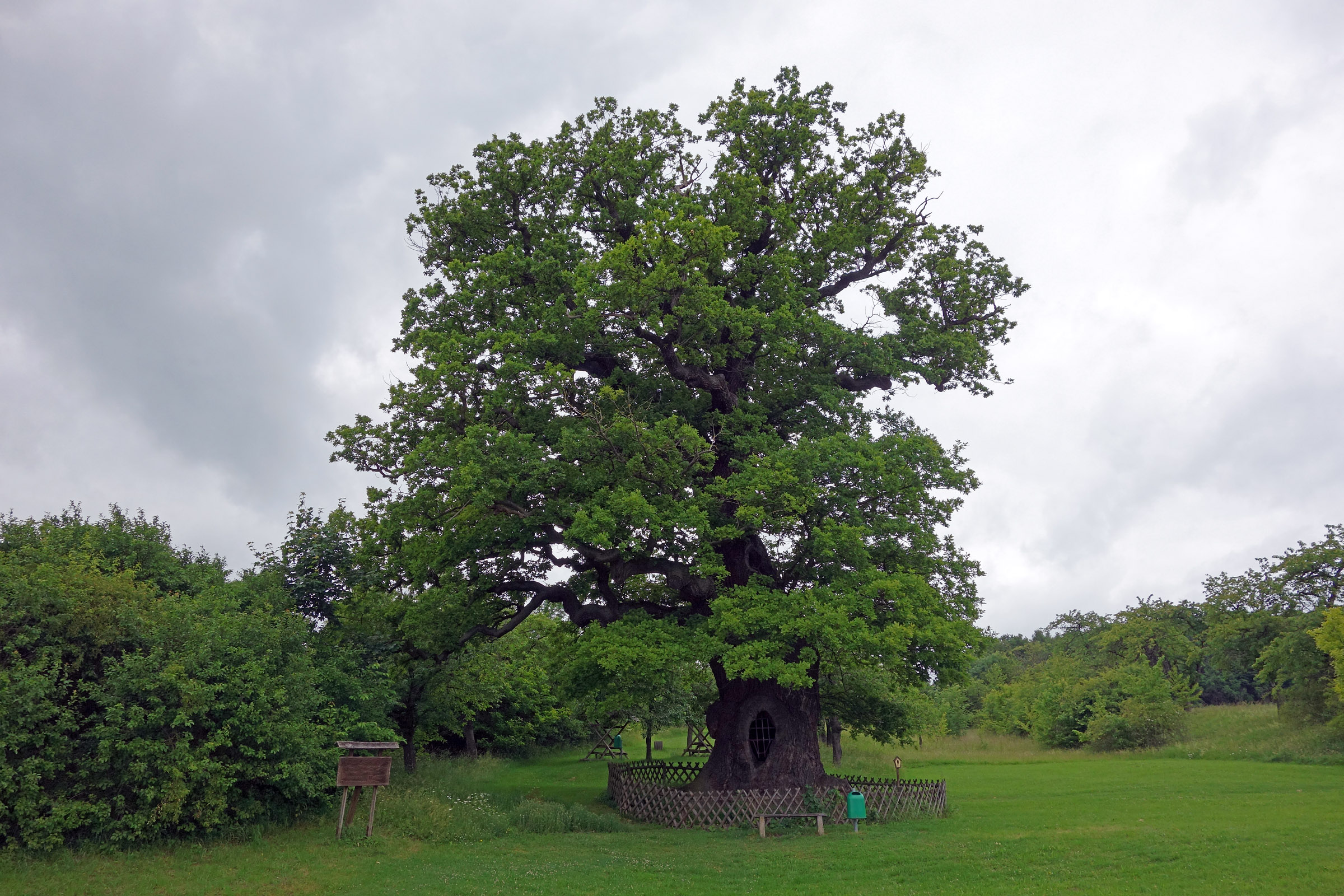
View from the south

==== Different ages ====
The age of the oak varies in the literature. A large part states between 800 and 1200 years, a smaller part about 600 years. The higher ages are based on the assumption that the royal oak first mentioned in documents in the 12th century is the same oak as the present one. However, this is not certain. Rather, according to the research of Hans-Jürgen Tillich, these ages are probably overestimated. The lower ages, on the other hand, do not take into account the historical reference, but mainly refer to investigations of the oak by Hans-Jürgen Tillich at the end of the 20th century and the increase in size in the last almost 200 years.

In Gerichtslinden und Thingplätze in Deutschland, the age was given as around 900 years in 2005. Hans Joachim Fröhlich assumed an age of around 1000 years in 1994. The information board by the oak gives an age of 900 to 1200 years. The nature conservation authority lists the oak as being over 600 years old. In 2009, the German Tree Archive estimated the age of the oak at 450 to 620 years based on the documented girth measurements from 1831 to the 2001 measurement, assuming an annual girth increase of 1.53 centimetres. As early as 1923, Scharf gave an estimated age of 500 years in the Zeitschrift für Forst- und Jagdwesen, based on a 30-year girth growth rate. In 1942, Engel attempted to determine the age of the oak from the period 1841 to 1941, taking into account Scharf's circumference measurements. In one hundred years, the trunk circumference increased by 1.79 meters, which results in a calculated radius increase of 28.5 centimeters or an average annual ring width of 2.85 millimeters. However, as the bark was included in the calculation, this value is somewhat distorted. If one assumes the average annual growth from 1841 to 1941 for the entire lifespan, the oak would have been 491 years old in 1941 according to Engel. The ages given by Scharf, Engel and the German Tree Archive, which were determined on the basis of surviving circumference measurements, are approximately the same as the scientific study by Hans-Jürgen Tillich in 1995. A forestry engineer attempted to determine the age of the oak using simpler methods than Hans-Jürgen Tillich and estimated it at 900 years.

==== Age determination by Hans-Jürgen Tillich ====
Hans-Jürgen Tillich examined the age of the oak using various methods. In the autumn of 1989, he carried out tree ring measurements on the branch that had broken off due to a lightning strike, sawing the branch into pieces of one meter in length. The cut closest to the trunk, which was fully woody, had a circumference of four meters with a slightly oval cross-section. The radius of the cut surface was 64 centimeters, with about five centimeters on the bark. This left 59 centimeters over which the annual rings were distributed. Counting them resulted in an age of 320 years for the branch. However, it is not known when the tree had formed this branch. A decadewise profile of the annual ring widths revealed that the thickness growth of the branch was significantly greater in the first 80 years than in the following period, averaging 2.78 centimeters per decade. After the eightieth year of the examined branch's life, growth leveled off to an average of 1.53 centimeters per decade. Transferring the average growth of the branch to the 9.42 meter circumference of the trunk resulted in an age of 928 years. However, according to Tillich, this age is doubtful, as it is not justified in principle to transfer the growth of a branch to the trunk in the same proportion.

A further step in determining the age was the procurement of an increment borer with the support of the district forester G. Köhler from Volkenroda. On July 2, 1992, three drill cores were taken from the trunk at breast height up to the hollow space inside the trunk. One core came from the south-east side, one from the north side and one from the north-east side, directly on the lightning track. About a third of the diameter of all three cores was removed lengthwise using a strong razor blade. The orientation of the cores in relation to each other produced an exact wood cross-section on which the annual rings were clearly visible. With the drawing arm of a stereomicroscope, drawings were made true to the original. This allowed each individual annual ring to be measured precisely. Due to the preparation of the drill cores, the outermost three to five annual rings had disintegrated and could not be taken into account. On the first drill core 63, on the second 43 and on the third 41 annual rings could be reliably evaluated. This only concerned the outermost part of the trunk, as the inside was no longer present. It is striking that the average growth per year, in relation to the trunk cross-section, was not the same everywhere. The growth rates were also significantly higher than those determined on the broken branch. The average annual growth rate, which resulted from the average of all annual rings of the three cores, was 2.3 millimeters. This corresponds to an annual increase in circumference of 1.44 centimeters. If one takes the radius of the trunk of 1.50 meters minus the bark of eight centimeters and the average annual ring width of 2.3 millimeters as a basis, one arrives at an age of 617 years. However, this value would only apply if there had been a lifelong linear growth. The annual ring measurements on the broken branch and investigations on other oaks showed that there was significantly stronger thickness growth in the first 80 to 100 years of life. The growth curve was therefore relatively steep at the beginning and then leveled off to a relatively linear course. Taking these circumstances into account, the "Royal Oak" can be estimated to be around 600 years old in 2010. All measurements handed down since 1831 are very close to or exactly the same as the values determined.

== Literature ==
- Weise, R.; Fickel, U.; Halle, R.; Hochstrate, W.; Lehnert, E.; Faupel, R.; Kaiser, R. (2007), Naturschutzinformationszentrum Nordthüringen (ed.), Naturdenkmale im Unstrut-Hainich-Kreis
- Kühn, Stefan; Ullrich, Bernd; Kühn, Uwe (2007), Deutschlands alte Bäume (5. erweiterte ed.), München: BLV Verlagsgesellschaft, ISBN 978-3-8354-0183-9
- Anette Lenzing (2005), Gerichtslinden und Thingplätze in Deutschland, Könighaus im Taunus: Karl Robert Langewiesche Nachfolger Hans Köster Verlagsbuchhandlung KG, ISBN 3-7845-4520-3
- Hans-Jürgen Tillich (1995), Mühlhäuser Museen (ed.), "Das Alter der "1000jährigen" Eiche bei Volkenroda (Unstrut-Hainich-Kreis)", Mühlhäuser Beiträge, vol. Heft 18, Mühlhausen: Verlag und Druck GmbH C. Schröter Mühlhausen, pp. 5–12
- Heinz Freybote (1994), Orts-Chronik Volkenroda – Gemeinde Körner, Gemeinde Körner: Eigenverlag
