= Bad Tennstedt =

- Town
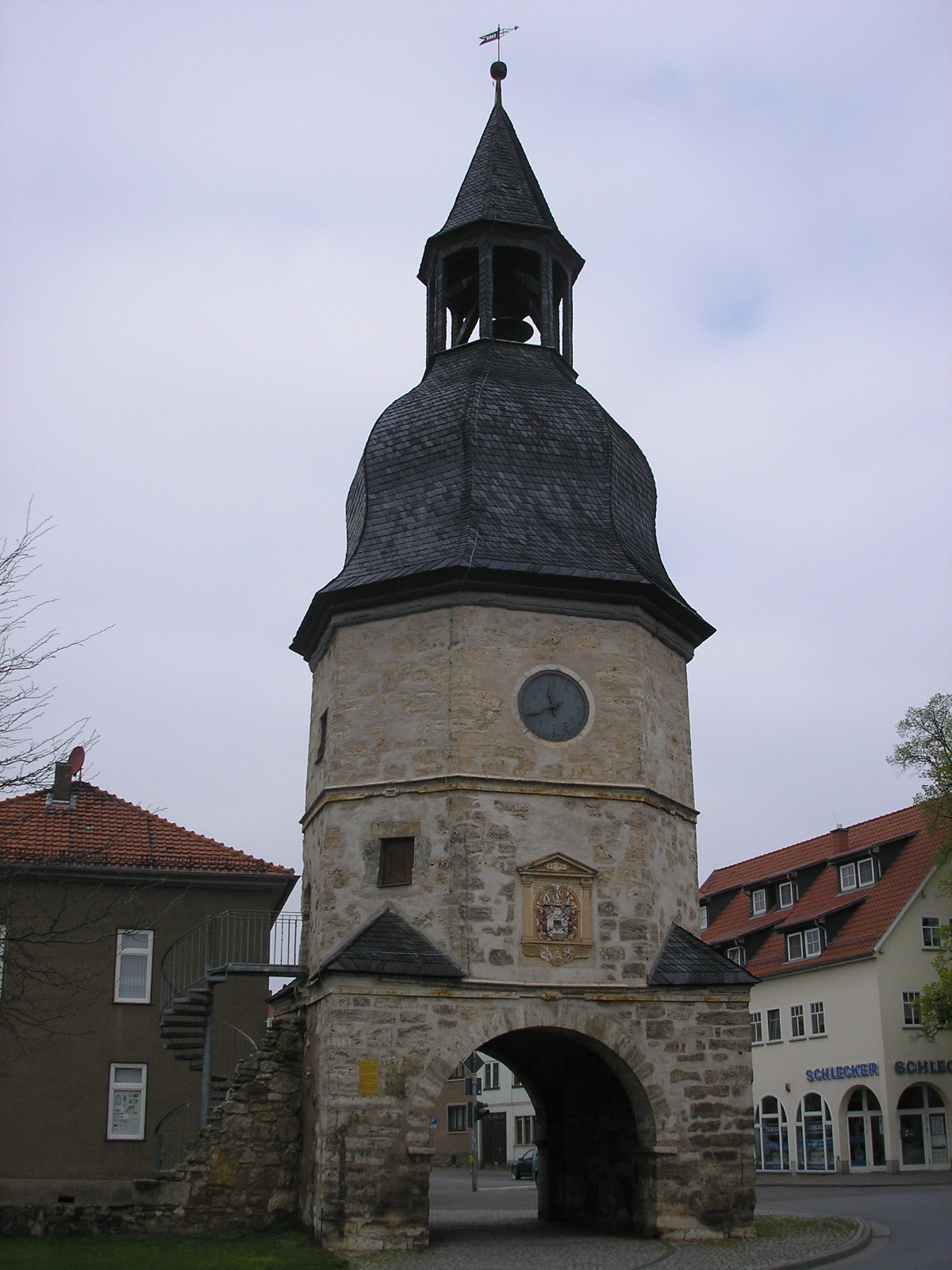
- Osthöfer Tor.

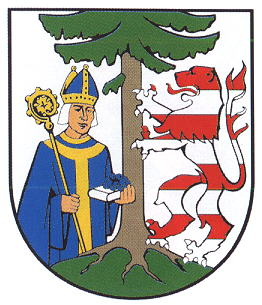
- Coat of arms

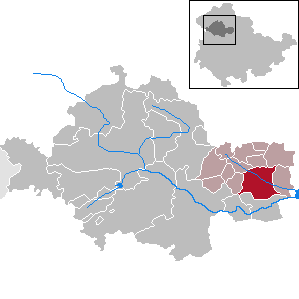
- Location of Bad Tennstedt within Unstrut-Hainich-Kreis district
- Interactive map of Bad Tennstedt
- Location within Germany Location within Thuringia
- Coordinates: 51°9′14″N 10°50′14″E
- Country: Germany
- State: Thuringia
- District: Unstrut-Hainich-Kreis
- Municipal assoc.: Bad Tennstedt

Government
  - Mayor (2022–28): Jens Weimann (CDU)

Area
  - Total: 27.42 km^{2} (10.59 sq mi)
- Elevation: 172 m (564 ft)

Population (2025-12-31)
  - Total: 2,399
  - Density: 87.49/km^{2} (226.6/sq mi)
- Time zone: UTC+01:00 (CET)
  - Summer (DST): UTC+02:00 (CEST)
- Postal codes: 99955
- Dialling codes: 036041
- Vehicle registration: UH
- Website: www.badtennstedt.de

Bad Tennstedt (German: [baːt ˈtɛnˌʃtɛt]) is a town in the Unstrut-Hainich-Kreis district, in Thuringia, Germany. It is situated 27 km east of Mühlhausen, and 24 km northwest of Erfurt.

The Romantic poet Novalis worked here from 1794 until 1796. During his stay he met Sophie von Kühn, his later fiancée.

== Personality ==
=== Natives ===
- Christoph Schmidt (1629-1676), merchant and alderman, grandfather of Friedrich Gottlieb Klopstock
- Johann August Ernesti (1707-1781), educator, scholar and theologian

=== People associated with Tennstedt ===
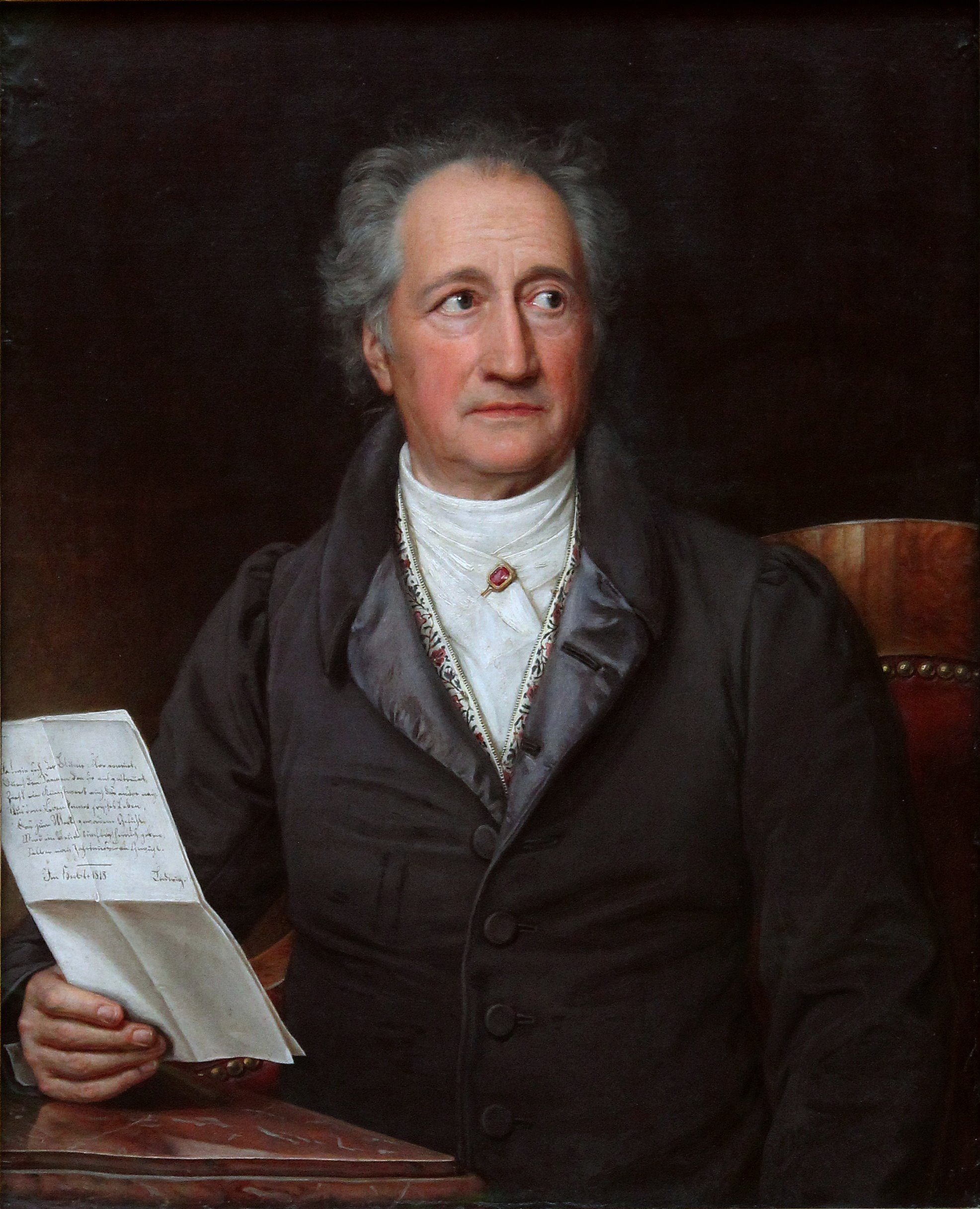
Johann Wolfgang von Goethe (1828)

- Johann Wolfgang von Goethe (1749-1832), stayed for curative treatments in 1816 Tennstedt, of this now reminds the Goethe House
- Friedrich von Hardenberg (pseudonym Novalis, 1772-1801), was from 1794 to 1796 employed in Tennstedt in Saxon Management Service
- Warren William (1894-1948), American film star of the 1930s with ancestors from Tennstedt
