= Gottlob Heinrich Curt von Tottleben =

German-Russian general (1715–1773)

Gottlob Curt Heinrich von Tottleben
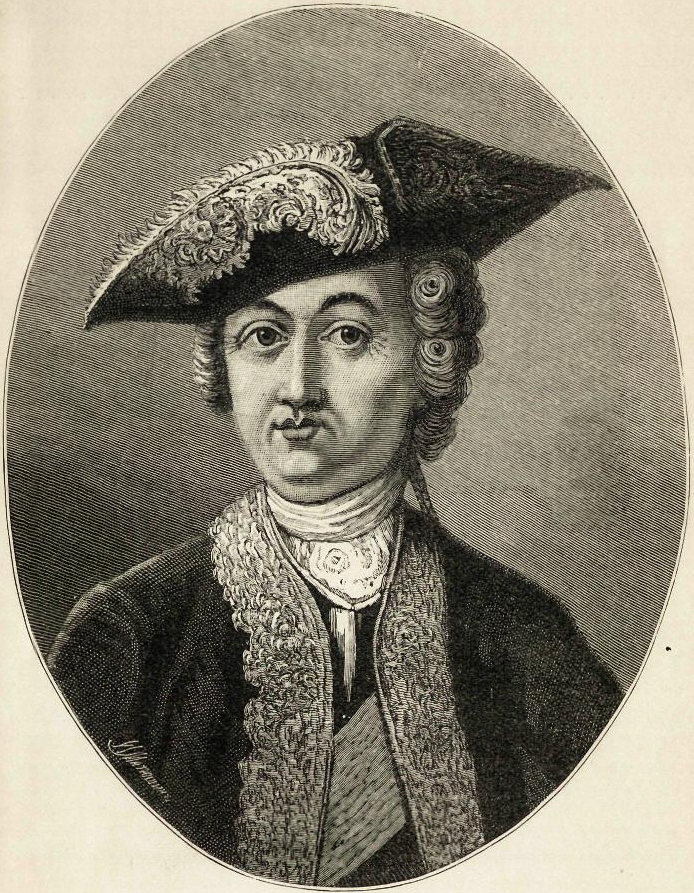
- Born: 21 December 1715; Tottleben
- Died: 20 March 1773 (aged 57)
- Military career
- Allegiance: Russian Empire
- Service years: 1759–1773
- Conflicts: Seven Years' War; Battle of Kunersdorf; Russo-Turkish War (1768–1774); Siege of Şorapani; Siege of Poti (1770–1771)

Gottlob Curt Heinrich Graf von Tottleben, Herr auf Tottleben, Zeippau und Hansdorf im Saganschen (also Tottleben, Todtleben, or Todleben; Russian: Готлиб-Генрих Тотлебен; 21 December 1715 – 20 March 1773) was a Saxon-born Russian general known for his adventurism and contradictory military career during the Seven Years' War and, then, the Russo-Turkish War (1768–1774) as a commander of the first Russian expeditionary force in Kartli-Kakheti. His name refers to his domains at Tottleben in Thuringia, Zeippau, and Hansdorf of Sagan in Lower Silesia.

== Early career ==
Totleben was born in Tottleben, Thuringia, and served at the court of Augustus III, King of Poland and Elector of Saxony. He fled Saxony after being accused of corruption. He then served for various periods at the courts of Saxe-Weissenfels, Bavaria, the Dutch Republic during the War of the Austrian Succession, and the Kingdom of Prussia. In 1747, he is mentioned as commander of a regiment of infantry of the Dutch Republic, but the regiment existed only on paper and was never realized. By then he already had a reputation as a scoundrel.

Count Totleben entered the Russian service during the Seven Years' War. He distinguished himself at the Battle of Kunersdorf and was promoted to General. Totleben gained particular fame for his brief occupation of the Prussian capital Berlin in 1760. Shortly, the advance of Frederick the Great's Prussian Army forced him to retreat, however. In June 1761, he was accused of grand treason and arrested in Pomerania. Sent in chains to Saint Petersburg, he was sentenced to death via quartering, but Empress Catherine the Great pardoned him in 1763. Nevertheless, Totleben was deprived of all his titles and awards and sent into exile abroad or to Siberia.

== Expedition to Georgia ==
In 1768, with the outbreak of the war with the Ottoman Empire, he was summoned to active service again, this time in Transcaucasia, where, for the first time in the history of the Russo-Turkish wars, Catherine decided to stage a military diversion against the Ottomans' frontier provinces. Thus, Totleben became the first commander to have brought an organized Russian military force to Transcaucasia through the Darial Gorge. He was instructed to join his forces with King Heraclius II of Georgia who hoped to reconquer the Ottoman-held southern Georgian lands in conjunction with Russia. However, Totleben soon quarrelled with the Georgian king and his commanders, whom he despised as "ignorant orientals" and demanded the exclusion of all Georgian officers from a combined army. Several Russian officers plotted against Totleben who, in his turn, accused Georgians of instigating all intrigues. The relations between the Russian commander and Heraclius were subjected to greater strain in April 1770, when the Russo-Georgian army marched against Ahıska (Akhaltsikhe), the Ottoman stronghold in Georgia. Totleben suddenly showed reluctance to engage in battle and abandoned the king on the battlefield. While the battle raged between the Georgians and Turks, Totleben marched to Tiflis and allied himself with a party of oppositionist Georgian nobles to stage a coup. However, Heraclius' victory over the Turks at the Battle of Aspindza made this plan unrealizable. The Russian government sent Captain Yazykov to investigate the affair, but Totleben had already crossed into Imereti, western Georgia, where he acted more energetically. Totleben dispossessed the Turks of the fortresses of Şorapani (Shorapani) and Bağdati (Baghdati) and helped King Solomon I of Imereti recover his capital Kutaisi on 6 August 1770. He then routed 25,000 Ottoman troops on his march to the Black Sea and laid siege to the fortress of Poti. However, Totleben again found himself in the centre of intrigues between Solomon and his defiant vassal princes of Mingrelia and Guria who wanted to secure Russian support against each other. The siege of Poti did not go well for the besiegers, and Totleben's relations with Solomon rapidly deteriorated. Totleben was recalled from Georgia in January 1771 and assigned to lead a division at Warsaw where he soon died.

== Bibliography ==
- "Тотлебен, Готлиб-Генрих" . Brockhaus and Efron Encyclopedic Dictionary (in Russian). 1906.
- (in Russian) Готлиб-Генрих Тотлебен (Gottlieb-Heinrich Totleben), in The Russian Biographical Dictionary
- Avtorkhanov, Abdurakhman & Broxup, Marie (1992), The North Caucasus Barrier: The Russian Advance Towards the Muslim World. C. Hurst & Co. Publishers, ISBN 1-85065-305-4.
- (in German) Kneschke, Ernst Heinrich, Prof. Dr.: Neues allgemeines Deutsches Adels-Lexicon im Vereine mit mehreren Historikern herausgegeben von Prof. Dr. Ernst Heinrich Kneschke (lit. 'Neues allgemeines deutsches Adels-Lexicon, published by Prof. Dr. Ernst Heinrich Kneschke together with several historians'), unmodified reprint of the edition published in 1859–1870 by Friedrich Voigt in Leipzig. Vol. IX, Degener & Co., owner Oswald Spohr, Leipzig 1930
- Lang, David Marshall (1962), A Modern History of Georgia. London: Weidenfeld and Nicolson.
- Lang, D. M. (1951), "Count Todtleben's Expedition to Georgia 1769–1771 according to a French Eyewitness". Bulletin of the School of Oriental and African Studies, University of London, Vol. 13, No. 4, pp. 878–907.
- (in Russian) Potto, Vasily (2006, originally published 1899), Кавказская война. В 5 томах. Том 1. От древнейших времен до Ермолова (The Caucasus War. Vol. 1: From the earliest times to Yermolov), Центрполиграф (Tsentripoligraf), ISBN 5-9524-2105-9, 5-9524-2104-0
- (in Russian) Repinsky, Grigory Kuzmich: Граф Готтлоб-Курт-Генрих Тоттлебен в в 1715–1763 г.г. Материалы для биографии ('Count Gottlob-Kurt-Heinrich Tottleben in 1715–1763. Materials for a biography'), in Russkaya Starina, October 1888, June, September and October 1889 (issues LX, LXII, LXIII, LXIV)
