= Kirchheilingen =

- Municipality
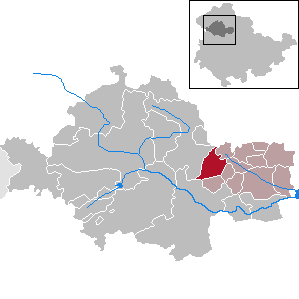
- Location of Kirchheilingen within Unstrut-Hainich-Kreis district
- Interactive map of Kirchheilingen
- Location within Germany Location within Thuringia
- Coordinates: 51°11′N 10°42′E
- Country: Germany
- State: Thuringia
- District: Unstrut-Hainich-Kreis
- Municipal assoc.: Bad Tennstedt

Government
  - Mayor (2022–28): Jan Behner

Area
  - Total: 16.67 km^{2} (6.44 sq mi)
- Elevation: 250 m (820 ft)

Population (2025-12-31)
  - Total: 754
  - Density: 45.2/km^{2} (117/sq mi)
- Time zone: UTC+01:00 (CET)
  - Summer (DST): UTC+02:00 (CEST)
- Postal codes: 99947
- Dialling codes: 036043
- Vehicle registration: UH
- Website: www.kirchheilingen.com

Kirchheilingen (German pronunciation: [kɪʁçˈhaɪlɪŋən]) is a municipality in the Unstrut-Hainich-Kreis district of Thuringia, Germany.
