= List of minor planets: 667001–668000 =

The following is a partial list of minor planets, running from minor-planet number 667001 through 668000, inclusive. The primary data for this and other partial lists is based on JPL's "Small-Body Orbital Elements" and data available from the Minor Planet Center. Critical list information is also provided by the MPC, unless otherwise specified from Lowell Observatory. A detailed description of the table's columns and additional sources are given on the main page including a complete list of every page in this series, and a statistical break-up on the dynamical classification of minor planets.

Also see the summary list of all named bodies in numerical and alphabetical order, and the corresponding naming citations for the number range of this particular list. New namings may only be added to this list after official publication, as the preannouncement of names is condemned by the Working Group for Small Bodies Nomenclature of the International Astronomical Union.

Near-Earth obj.	MBA (inner)	MBA (outer)	Centaur
Mars-crosser	MBA (middle)	Jupiter trojan	Trans-Neptunian obj.
Unclassified

== 667001–667100 ==
Designation			Discovery			Properties		Ref
Permanent	Provisional	Named after	Date	Site	Discoverer(s)	Category	Diam.	Ref
667001	2010 XU_{102}	—	December 14, 2010	Mount Lemmon	Mount Lemmon Survey	·	1.3 km	MPC · JPL
667002	2010 XF_{103}	—	December 18, 2014	Haleakala	Pan-STARRS 1	·	1.2 km	MPC · JPL
667003	2010 XG_{103}	—	December 2, 2010	Kitt Peak	Spacewatch	·	1.3 km	MPC · JPL
667004	2010 XL_{104}	—	June 30, 2014	Haleakala	Pan-STARRS 1	·	2.8 km	MPC · JPL
667005	2010 XU_{104}	—	December 5, 2010	Mount Lemmon	Mount Lemmon Survey	·	990 m	MPC · JPL
667006	2010 XA_{105}	—	December 14, 2010	Mount Lemmon	Mount Lemmon Survey	KON	1.9 km	MPC · JPL
667007	2010 XL_{105}	—	November 20, 2016	Mount Lemmon	Mount Lemmon Survey	·	2.8 km	MPC · JPL
667008	2010 XY_{105}	—	October 9, 2015	Haleakala	Pan-STARRS 1	·	2.1 km	MPC · JPL
667009	2010 XL_{108}	—	December 6, 2010	Mount Lemmon	Mount Lemmon Survey	·	810 m	MPC · JPL
667010	2010 XV_{108}	—	December 8, 2010	Kitt Peak	Spacewatch	·	1.0 km	MPC · JPL
667011	2010 XG_{109}	—	December 8, 2010	Mount Lemmon	Mount Lemmon Survey	EUN	870 m	MPC · JPL
667012	2010 XR_{109}	—	December 6, 2010	Mount Lemmon	Mount Lemmon Survey	·	1.9 km	MPC · JPL
667013	2010 XN_{110}	—	December 13, 2010	Mount Lemmon	Mount Lemmon Survey	·	2.2 km	MPC · JPL
667014	2010 XR_{110}	—	December 10, 2010	Mount Lemmon	Mount Lemmon Survey	·	1.1 km	MPC · JPL
667015	2010 XZ_{112}	—	December 8, 2010	Catalina	CSS	·	2.7 km	MPC · JPL
667016	2010 XV_{113}	—	December 5, 2010	Mount Lemmon	Mount Lemmon Survey	·	520 m	MPC · JPL
667017	2010 XW_{114}	—	December 13, 2010	Mount Lemmon	Mount Lemmon Survey	L4	6.3 km	MPC · JPL
667018	2010 XR_{116}	—	December 13, 2010	Mount Lemmon	Mount Lemmon Survey	·	2.0 km	MPC · JPL
667019	2010 XN_{118}	—	December 14, 2010	Mount Lemmon	Mount Lemmon Survey	L4	5.7 km	MPC · JPL
667020	2010 XQ_{119}	—	December 3, 2010	Mount Lemmon	Mount Lemmon Survey	L4	5.1 km	MPC · JPL
667021	2010 XM_{121}	—	December 10, 2010	Mount Lemmon	Mount Lemmon Survey	(5)	1.0 km	MPC · JPL
667022	2010 XU_{121}	—	December 2, 2010	Kitt Peak	Spacewatch	L4	6.8 km	MPC · JPL
667023	2010 YN_{4}	—	December 15, 2010	Catalina	CSS	·	1.1 km	MPC · JPL
667024	2010 YO_{6}	—	December 25, 2010	Mount Lemmon	Mount Lemmon Survey	·	1.0 km	MPC · JPL
667025	2010 YW_{6}	—	December 25, 2010	Mount Lemmon	Mount Lemmon Survey	·	1.1 km	MPC · JPL
667026	2011 AH_{1}	—	December 3, 2010	Mount Lemmon	Mount Lemmon Survey	·	960 m	MPC · JPL
667027	2011 AA_{4}	—	November 16, 2010	Mount Lemmon	Mount Lemmon Survey	·	1.4 km	MPC · JPL
667028	2011 AD_{8}	—	January 2, 2011	Mount Lemmon	Mount Lemmon Survey	EOS	1.8 km	MPC · JPL
667029	2011 AC_{14}	—	February 13, 2004	Palomar	NEAT	·	1.1 km	MPC · JPL
667030	2011 AP_{14}	—	November 15, 2010	Mount Lemmon	Mount Lemmon Survey	(5)	950 m	MPC · JPL
667031	2011 AX_{17}	—	December 2, 2010	Mount Lemmon	Mount Lemmon Survey	·	2.8 km	MPC · JPL
667032	2011 AM_{23}	—	December 12, 2006	Marly	P. Kocher	·	1.2 km	MPC · JPL
667033	2011 AK_{25}	—	December 4, 2010	Mount Lemmon	Mount Lemmon Survey	·	2.0 km	MPC · JPL
667034	2011 AP_{25}	—	January 3, 2011	Mount Lemmon	Mount Lemmon Survey	·	2.9 km	MPC · JPL
667035	2011 AX_{25}	—	September 19, 2003	Palomar	NEAT	·	3.5 km	MPC · JPL
667036	2011 AZ_{25}	—	January 4, 2011	Mount Lemmon	Mount Lemmon Survey	·	1.4 km	MPC · JPL
667037	2011 AO_{29}	—	February 8, 2007	Mount Lemmon	Mount Lemmon Survey	·	1.2 km	MPC · JPL
667038	2011 AD_{30}	—	December 2, 2005	Kitt Peak	Wasserman, L. H., Millis, R. L.	·	2.7 km	MPC · JPL
667039	2011 AL_{30}	—	December 7, 2010	Mount Lemmon	Mount Lemmon Survey	·	1.6 km	MPC · JPL
667040	2011 AD_{32}	—	December 6, 2010	Mount Lemmon	Mount Lemmon Survey	·	920 m	MPC · JPL
667041	2011 AM_{33}	—	November 7, 2010	Mount Lemmon	Mount Lemmon Survey	·	1.3 km	MPC · JPL
667042	2011 AT_{37}	—	December 6, 2010	Kitt Peak	Spacewatch	·	3.0 km	MPC · JPL
667043	2011 AX_{37}	—	December 8, 2010	Mount Lemmon	Mount Lemmon Survey	EOS	2.2 km	MPC · JPL
667044	2011 AU_{38}	—	December 14, 2010	ESA OGS	ESA OGS	·	3.9 km	MPC · JPL
667045	2011 AF_{40}	—	October 22, 2006	Catalina	CSS	·	1.1 km	MPC · JPL
667046	2011 AF_{42}	—	December 8, 2010	Mount Lemmon	Mount Lemmon Survey	·	1.2 km	MPC · JPL
667047	2011 AN_{49}	—	January 23, 2006	Kitt Peak	Spacewatch	·	1.9 km	MPC · JPL
667048	2011 AL_{51}	—	March 25, 2007	Mount Lemmon	Mount Lemmon Survey	·	2.8 km	MPC · JPL
667049	2011 AZ_{53}	—	January 14, 2011	Mount Lemmon	Mount Lemmon Survey	·	1.3 km	MPC · JPL
667050	2011 AW_{54}	—	December 14, 2010	Mount Lemmon	Mount Lemmon Survey	·	2.7 km	MPC · JPL
667051	2011 AE_{55}	—	January 3, 2011	Mount Lemmon	Mount Lemmon Survey	·	910 m	MPC · JPL
667052	2011 AL_{59}	—	January 12, 2011	Mount Lemmon	Mount Lemmon Survey	·	1.1 km	MPC · JPL
667053	2011 AX_{61}	—	March 25, 2007	Mount Lemmon	Mount Lemmon Survey	·	3.0 km	MPC · JPL
667054	2011 AF_{65}	—	January 14, 2011	Mount Lemmon	Mount Lemmon Survey	·	960 m	MPC · JPL
667055	2011 AZ_{65}	—	September 18, 2009	Catalina	CSS	·	2.9 km	MPC · JPL
667056	2011 AO_{70}	—	January 3, 2011	Mount Lemmon	Mount Lemmon Survey	·	1.1 km	MPC · JPL
667057	2011 AQ_{81}	—	January 14, 2011	Kitt Peak	Spacewatch	·	2.7 km	MPC · JPL
667058	2011 AW_{84}	—	December 6, 2010	Mount Lemmon	Mount Lemmon Survey	·	2.3 km	MPC · JPL
667059	2011 AA_{85}	—	January 12, 2011	Mount Lemmon	Mount Lemmon Survey	·	1.4 km	MPC · JPL
667060	2011 AE_{88}	—	January 13, 2011	Mount Lemmon	Mount Lemmon Survey	·	1.3 km	MPC · JPL
667061	2011 AQ_{88}	—	January 5, 2011	Mount Lemmon	Mount Lemmon Survey	HNS	1.0 km	MPC · JPL
667062	2011 AG_{90}	—	December 5, 2010	Mount Lemmon	Mount Lemmon Survey	·	480 m	MPC · JPL
667063	2011 AM_{90}	—	January 13, 2011	Kitt Peak	Spacewatch	(5)	820 m	MPC · JPL
667064	2011 AV_{90}	—	December 7, 2010	Mount Lemmon	Mount Lemmon Survey	·	1.2 km	MPC · JPL
667065	2011 AM_{91}	—	January 14, 2011	Mount Lemmon	Mount Lemmon Survey	·	970 m	MPC · JPL
667066	2011 AB_{92}	—	January 8, 2011	Catalina	CSS	·	1.2 km	MPC · JPL
667067	2011 AJ_{95}	—	January 14, 2011	Kitt Peak	Spacewatch	·	1.0 km	MPC · JPL
667068	2011 AN_{95}	—	January 14, 2011	Mount Lemmon	Mount Lemmon Survey	·	1.5 km	MPC · JPL
667069	2011 AY_{95}	—	January 10, 2011	Mount Lemmon	Mount Lemmon Survey	·	1.2 km	MPC · JPL
667070	2011 AN_{96}	—	January 2, 2011	Mount Lemmon	Mount Lemmon Survey	·	1.5 km	MPC · JPL
667071	2011 AX_{98}	—	January 12, 2011	Mount Lemmon	Mount Lemmon Survey	·	1.5 km	MPC · JPL
667072	2011 AM_{101}	—	January 4, 2011	Mount Lemmon	Mount Lemmon Survey	·	1.3 km	MPC · JPL
667073	2011 AU_{101}	—	January 14, 2011	Mount Lemmon	Mount Lemmon Survey	·	1.8 km	MPC · JPL
667074	2011 AH_{103}	—	January 14, 2011	Mount Lemmon	Mount Lemmon Survey	·	1.2 km	MPC · JPL
667075	2011 AP_{103}	—	January 12, 2011	Mount Lemmon	Mount Lemmon Survey	RAF	850 m	MPC · JPL
667076	2011 AR_{106}	—	January 2, 2011	Mount Lemmon	Mount Lemmon Survey	(260)	3.0 km	MPC · JPL
667077	2011 BJ	—	December 6, 2010	Mount Lemmon	Mount Lemmon Survey	·	2.4 km	MPC · JPL
667078	2011 BH_{8}	—	October 24, 2005	Mauna Kea	A. Boattini	THM	2.0 km	MPC · JPL
667079	2011 BS_{11}	—	December 13, 2010	Mount Lemmon	Mount Lemmon Survey	·	3.2 km	MPC · JPL
667080	2011 BL_{13}	—	January 8, 2011	Mount Lemmon	Mount Lemmon Survey	BRG	1.0 km	MPC · JPL
667081	2011 BQ_{14}	—	January 25, 2011	Dauban	C. Rinner, Kugel, F.	VER	2.8 km	MPC · JPL
667082	2011 BH_{16}	—	July 3, 2005	Apache Point	SDSS Collaboration	·	1.6 km	MPC · JPL
667083	2011 BH_{23}	—	December 8, 2010	Mount Lemmon	Mount Lemmon Survey	·	1.4 km	MPC · JPL
667084	2011 BR_{24}	—	October 29, 2010	Mount Lemmon	Mount Lemmon Survey	·	2.2 km	MPC · JPL
667085	2011 BT_{24}	—	November 12, 2010	Mount Lemmon	Mount Lemmon Survey	L4	8.6 km	MPC · JPL
667086	2011 BC_{26}	—	October 24, 2005	Mauna Kea	A. Boattini	·	2.0 km	MPC · JPL
667087	2011 BJ_{30}	—	August 29, 2005	Vail-Jarnac	Jarnac	(5)	1.4 km	MPC · JPL
667088	2011 BO_{30}	—	October 31, 2005	Mauna Kea	A. Boattini	·	2.7 km	MPC · JPL
667089	2011 BK_{33}	—	February 21, 2007	Kitt Peak	Spacewatch	·	920 m	MPC · JPL
667090	2011 BV_{33}	—	April 23, 2004	Kitt Peak	Spacewatch	NYS	1.1 km	MPC · JPL
667091	2011 BV_{34}	—	January 14, 2011	Kitt Peak	Spacewatch	MAR	930 m	MPC · JPL
667092	2011 BC_{36}	—	February 21, 2007	Mount Lemmon	Mount Lemmon Survey	·	1.0 km	MPC · JPL
667093	2011 BK_{38}	—	July 16, 2004	Cerro Tololo	Deep Ecliptic Survey	EUN	1.5 km	MPC · JPL
667094	2011 BY_{39}	—	April 3, 2000	Kitt Peak	Spacewatch	·	3.6 km	MPC · JPL
667095	2011 BS_{44}	—	January 30, 2011	Piszkés-tető	K. Sárneczky, S. Kürti	·	1.9 km	MPC · JPL
667096	2011 BD_{47}	—	January 31, 2011	Piszkéstető	K. Sárneczky, Z. Kuli	·	690 m	MPC · JPL
667097	2011 BF_{49}	—	January 31, 2011	Piszkés-tető	K. Sárneczky, Z. Kuli	·	1.3 km	MPC · JPL
667098	2011 BO_{55}	—	August 24, 2008	Črni Vrh	Skvarč, J.	·	3.6 km	MPC · JPL
667099	2011 BP_{55}	—	January 23, 2011	Mount Lemmon	Mount Lemmon Survey	EOS	1.6 km	MPC · JPL
667100	2011 BP_{56}	—	January 25, 2011	Mount Lemmon	Mount Lemmon Survey	·	1.2 km	MPC · JPL

== 667101–667200 ==
back to top

Designation			Discovery			Properties		Ref
Permanent	Provisional	Named after	Date	Site	Discoverer(s)	Category	Diam.	Ref
667101	2011 BJ_{57}	—	October 7, 2005	Catalina	CSS	·	1.2 km	MPC · JPL
667102	2011 BB_{58}	—	January 30, 2011	Mount Lemmon	Mount Lemmon Survey	·	460 m	MPC · JPL
667103	2011 BL_{63}	—	January 27, 2011	Kitt Peak	Spacewatch	·	1.5 km	MPC · JPL
667104	2011 BK_{65}	—	January 31, 2011	Piszkés-tető	K. Sárneczky, Z. Kuli	·	920 m	MPC · JPL
667105	2011 BW_{70}	—	February 10, 2011	Mount Lemmon	Mount Lemmon Survey	·	2.8 km	MPC · JPL
667106	2011 BA_{71}	—	December 21, 2006	Kitt Peak	Spacewatch	V	660 m	MPC · JPL
667107	2011 BJ_{71}	—	February 5, 2011	Haleakala	Pan-STARRS 1	·	1.3 km	MPC · JPL
667108	2011 BZ_{71}	—	May 6, 2006	Mount Lemmon	Mount Lemmon Survey	HYG	2.4 km	MPC · JPL
667109	2011 BA_{72}	—	December 21, 2006	Kitt Peak	L. H. Wasserman, M. W. Buie	·	1.3 km	MPC · JPL
667110	2011 BU_{72}	—	October 23, 2009	Mount Lemmon	Mount Lemmon Survey	·	1.1 km	MPC · JPL
667111	2011 BS_{75}	—	January 30, 2011	Haleakala	Pan-STARRS 1	·	1.2 km	MPC · JPL
667112	2011 BD_{79}	—	January 29, 2011	Mount Lemmon	Mount Lemmon Survey	·	1.5 km	MPC · JPL
667113	2011 BM_{81}	—	January 28, 2011	Mount Lemmon	Mount Lemmon Survey	(5)	900 m	MPC · JPL
667114	2011 BS_{82}	—	December 8, 2010	Mount Lemmon	Mount Lemmon Survey	JUN	810 m	MPC · JPL
667115	2011 BT_{86}	—	August 30, 2005	Palomar	NEAT	EUN	990 m	MPC · JPL
667116	2011 BG_{90}	—	December 6, 2010	Mount Lemmon	Mount Lemmon Survey	·	3.0 km	MPC · JPL
667117	2011 BM_{92}	—	September 20, 2003	Kitt Peak	Spacewatch	EOS	2.2 km	MPC · JPL
667118	2011 BO_{92}	—	September 26, 2003	Apache Point	SDSS Collaboration	·	2.9 km	MPC · JPL
667119	2011 BV_{92}	—	January 28, 2011	Mount Lemmon	Mount Lemmon Survey	·	3.3 km	MPC · JPL
667120	2011 BE_{95}	—	January 9, 2011	Mount Lemmon	Mount Lemmon Survey	·	970 m	MPC · JPL
667121	2011 BY_{95}	—	August 9, 2005	Cerro Tololo	Deep Ecliptic Survey	V	620 m	MPC · JPL
667122	2011 BL_{96}	—	December 8, 2010	Mount Lemmon	Mount Lemmon Survey	V	690 m	MPC · JPL
667123	2011 BU_{103}	—	January 27, 2011	Mount Lemmon	Mount Lemmon Survey	·	2.4 km	MPC · JPL
667124	2011 BK_{104}	—	March 11, 2007	Mount Lemmon	Mount Lemmon Survey	·	1.0 km	MPC · JPL
667125	2011 BL_{104}	—	January 9, 2011	Charleston	R. Holmes	·	2.4 km	MPC · JPL
667126	2011 BU_{104}	—	January 27, 2007	Kitt Peak	Spacewatch	NYS	1.1 km	MPC · JPL
667127	2011 BM_{105}	—	January 28, 2011	Mount Lemmon	Mount Lemmon Survey	·	1.3 km	MPC · JPL
667128	2011 BA_{117}	—	January 2, 2011	Mount Lemmon	Mount Lemmon Survey	·	1.7 km	MPC · JPL
667129	2011 BR_{117}	—	January 13, 2011	Mount Lemmon	Mount Lemmon Survey	·	1.1 km	MPC · JPL
667130	2011 BE_{118}	—	January 15, 2011	Mount Lemmon	Mount Lemmon Survey	·	1.0 km	MPC · JPL
667131	2011 BQ_{118}	—	January 8, 2011	Mount Lemmon	Mount Lemmon Survey	RAF	840 m	MPC · JPL
667132	2011 BT_{118}	—	January 26, 2011	Mount Lemmon	Mount Lemmon Survey	·	2.2 km	MPC · JPL
667133	2011 BJ_{121}	—	August 28, 2003	Palomar	NEAT	·	2.8 km	MPC · JPL
667134	2011 BK_{123}	—	December 9, 2010	Mount Lemmon	Mount Lemmon Survey	URS	3.2 km	MPC · JPL
667135	2011 BR_{123}	—	October 14, 2009	Mount Lemmon	Mount Lemmon Survey	·	2.8 km	MPC · JPL
667136	2011 BF_{124}	—	February 8, 2011	Mount Lemmon	Mount Lemmon Survey	·	2.8 km	MPC · JPL
667137	2011 BO_{124}	—	February 8, 2011	Mount Lemmon	Mount Lemmon Survey	·	1.8 km	MPC · JPL
667138	2011 BS_{125}	—	January 27, 2011	Mount Lemmon	Mount Lemmon Survey	·	1.9 km	MPC · JPL
667139	2011 BX_{129}	—	January 28, 2011	Mount Lemmon	Mount Lemmon Survey	VER	2.6 km	MPC · JPL
667140	2011 BE_{133}	—	October 11, 2005	Kitt Peak	Spacewatch	·	1.1 km	MPC · JPL
667141	2011 BY_{134}	—	January 29, 2011	Mount Lemmon	Mount Lemmon Survey	·	1.3 km	MPC · JPL
667142	2011 BD_{137}	—	September 18, 2003	Kitt Peak	Spacewatch	·	490 m	MPC · JPL
667143	2011 BY_{137}	—	January 29, 2011	Mount Lemmon	Mount Lemmon Survey	·	1.2 km	MPC · JPL
667144	2011 BR_{138}	—	September 25, 2009	Catalina	CSS	·	1.6 km	MPC · JPL
667145	2011 BB_{140}	—	September 19, 2001	Apache Point	SDSS	·	1.1 km	MPC · JPL
667146	2011 BW_{140}	—	January 29, 2011	Mount Lemmon	Mount Lemmon Survey	·	1.7 km	MPC · JPL
667147	2011 BH_{144}	—	January 29, 2011	Mount Lemmon	Mount Lemmon Survey	·	2.9 km	MPC · JPL
667148	2011 BU_{147}	—	January 16, 2011	Mount Lemmon	Mount Lemmon Survey	ADE	1.7 km	MPC · JPL
667149	2011 BK_{149}	—	January 29, 2011	Mount Lemmon	Mount Lemmon Survey	·	1.3 km	MPC · JPL
667150	2011 BG_{150}	—	December 8, 2010	Mount Lemmon	Mount Lemmon Survey	·	1.1 km	MPC · JPL
667151	2011 BN_{152}	—	January 29, 2011	Mount Lemmon	Mount Lemmon Survey	TIR	3.0 km	MPC · JPL
667152	2011 BG_{154}	—	January 27, 2011	Mount Lemmon	Mount Lemmon Survey	·	750 m	MPC · JPL
667153	2011 BD_{156}	—	March 3, 2006	Kitt Peak	Spacewatch	·	2.7 km	MPC · JPL
667154	2011 BV_{157}	—	January 29, 2011	Mount Lemmon	Mount Lemmon Survey	·	930 m	MPC · JPL
667155	2011 BK_{161}	—	January 30, 2011	Mount Lemmon	Mount Lemmon Survey	·	670 m	MPC · JPL
667156	2011 BY_{161}	—	January 27, 2011	Mount Lemmon	Mount Lemmon Survey	·	1.0 km	MPC · JPL
667157	2011 BB_{168}	—	February 25, 2011	Mount Lemmon	Mount Lemmon Survey	HNS	880 m	MPC · JPL
667158	2011 BJ_{168}	—	February 26, 2011	Mount Lemmon	Mount Lemmon Survey	·	1.4 km	MPC · JPL
667159	2011 BR_{169}	—	February 5, 2011	Mount Lemmon	Mount Lemmon Survey	·	1.3 km	MPC · JPL
667160	2011 BO_{170}	—	January 30, 2011	Haleakala	Pan-STARRS 1	cubewano (hot)	195 km	MPC · JPL
667161	2011 BP_{170}	—	January 30, 2011	Haleakala	Pan-STARRS 1	res · 1:5	188 km	MPC · JPL
667162	2011 BD_{171}	—	January 30, 2011	Mount Lemmon	Mount Lemmon Survey	·	3.0 km	MPC · JPL
667163	2011 BD_{172}	—	January 17, 2011	Mount Lemmon	Mount Lemmon Survey	·	2.5 km	MPC · JPL
667164	2011 BM_{173}	—	March 14, 2016	Mount Lemmon	Mount Lemmon Survey	·	1.1 km	MPC · JPL
667165	2011 BL_{176}	—	January 16, 2011	Mount Lemmon	Mount Lemmon Survey	·	730 m	MPC · JPL
667166	2011 BX_{178}	—	January 23, 2011	Mount Lemmon	Mount Lemmon Survey	·	1.3 km	MPC · JPL
667167	2011 BN_{182}	—	February 6, 2011	Catalina	CSS	MAR	1.0 km	MPC · JPL
667168	2011 BB_{184}	—	February 8, 2011	Mount Lemmon	Mount Lemmon Survey	·	1.4 km	MPC · JPL
667169	2011 BM_{184}	—	April 27, 2012	Haleakala	Pan-STARRS 1	·	2.1 km	MPC · JPL
667170	2011 BT_{184}	—	May 12, 2015	Mount Lemmon	Mount Lemmon Survey	·	580 m	MPC · JPL
667171	2011 BT_{185}	—	February 11, 2011	Mount Lemmon	Mount Lemmon Survey	(5)	880 m	MPC · JPL
667172	2011 BX_{192}	—	July 27, 2014	Haleakala	Pan-STARRS 1	·	2.4 km	MPC · JPL
667173	2011 BK_{193}	—	February 12, 2011	Mount Lemmon	Mount Lemmon Survey	·	520 m	MPC · JPL
667174	2011 BU_{193}	—	January 30, 2011	Mount Lemmon	Mount Lemmon Survey	·	600 m	MPC · JPL
667175	2011 BW_{193}	—	January 27, 2011	Mount Lemmon	Mount Lemmon Survey	·	500 m	MPC · JPL
667176	2011 BN_{195}	—	January 27, 2011	Mount Lemmon	Mount Lemmon Survey	·	940 m	MPC · JPL
667177	2011 BV_{195}	—	January 28, 2011	Mount Lemmon	Mount Lemmon Survey	·	1.2 km	MPC · JPL
667178	2011 BK_{199}	—	January 28, 2011	Mount Lemmon	Mount Lemmon Survey	VER	2.0 km	MPC · JPL
667179	2011 BX_{202}	—	January 27, 2011	Mount Lemmon	Mount Lemmon Survey	·	1.1 km	MPC · JPL
667180	2011 BL_{208}	—	January 17, 2011	Mount Lemmon	Mount Lemmon Survey	·	1.0 km	MPC · JPL
667181	2011 CE_{8}	—	January 14, 2011	Kitt Peak	Spacewatch	MIS	1.8 km	MPC · JPL
667182	2011 CF_{8}	—	January 27, 2011	Kitt Peak	Spacewatch	·	2.5 km	MPC · JPL
667183	2011 CX_{9}	—	January 10, 2011	Kitt Peak	Spacewatch	EUN	960 m	MPC · JPL
667184	2011 CO_{10}	—	January 27, 2011	Kitt Peak	Spacewatch	·	1.3 km	MPC · JPL
667185	2011 CL_{17}	—	February 4, 2011	Catalina	CSS	(1547)	1.5 km	MPC · JPL
667186	2011 CP_{19}	—	September 1, 2005	Kitt Peak	Spacewatch	·	1.4 km	MPC · JPL
667187	2011 CZ_{23}	—	February 7, 2011	Mount Lemmon	Mount Lemmon Survey	·	480 m	MPC · JPL
667188	2011 CZ_{25}	—	January 29, 2011	Mount Lemmon	Mount Lemmon Survey	·	2.9 km	MPC · JPL
667189	2011 CL_{32}	—	August 27, 2003	Haleakala	NEAT	·	3.6 km	MPC · JPL
667190	2011 CV_{35}	—	January 27, 2011	Kitt Peak	Spacewatch	·	890 m	MPC · JPL
667191	2011 CE_{37}	—	February 5, 2011	Catalina	CSS	V	650 m	MPC · JPL
667192	2011 CY_{38}	—	November 9, 2009	Mount Lemmon	Mount Lemmon Survey	·	2.4 km	MPC · JPL
667193	2011 CZ_{38}	—	February 5, 2011	Mount Lemmon	Mount Lemmon Survey	·	1.2 km	MPC · JPL
667194	2011 CG_{41}	—	January 11, 2011	Kitt Peak	Spacewatch	·	930 m	MPC · JPL
667195	2011 CL_{41}	—	January 26, 2011	Mount Lemmon	Mount Lemmon Survey	·	450 m	MPC · JPL
667196	2011 CF_{42}	—	January 14, 2011	Kitt Peak	Spacewatch	·	2.6 km	MPC · JPL
667197	2011 CT_{50}	—	February 9, 2011	Mount Lemmon	Mount Lemmon Survey	H	440 m	MPC · JPL
667198	2011 CA_{51}	—	December 8, 2002	Haleakala	NEAT	·	1.3 km	MPC · JPL
667199	2011 CJ_{51}	—	December 3, 2005	Mauna Kea	A. Boattini	THM	2.2 km	MPC · JPL
667200	2011 CH_{52}	—	March 31, 2008	Mount Lemmon	Mount Lemmon Survey	·	570 m	MPC · JPL

== 667201–667300 ==
back to top

Designation			Discovery			Properties		Ref
Permanent	Provisional	Named after	Date	Site	Discoverer(s)	Category	Diam.	Ref
667201	2011 CJ_{52}	—	February 7, 2011	Mount Lemmon	Mount Lemmon Survey	·	480 m	MPC · JPL
667202	2011 CC_{58}	—	January 13, 2011	Mayhill-ISON	L. Elenin	·	1.2 km	MPC · JPL
667203	2011 CQ_{58}	—	September 30, 2005	Mount Lemmon	Mount Lemmon Survey	·	1.1 km	MPC · JPL
667204	2011 CH_{59}	—	September 15, 2009	Kitt Peak	Spacewatch	·	910 m	MPC · JPL
667205	2011 CG_{64}	—	January 30, 2006	Kitt Peak	Spacewatch	·	2.8 km	MPC · JPL
667206	2011 CN_{64}	—	May 14, 2008	Mount Lemmon	Mount Lemmon Survey	V	580 m	MPC · JPL
667207	2011 CE_{68}	—	December 8, 2010	Mount Lemmon	Mount Lemmon Survey	EUN	1.0 km	MPC · JPL
667208	2011 CP_{69}	—	February 7, 2000	Kitt Peak	Spacewatch	EOS	2.1 km	MPC · JPL
667209	2011 CA_{70}	—	February 7, 2011	Socorro	LINEAR	H	490 m	MPC · JPL
667210	2011 CD_{79}	—	February 10, 2011	Mount Lemmon	Mount Lemmon Survey	·	570 m	MPC · JPL
667211	2011 CL_{82}	—	February 5, 2011	Haleakala	Pan-STARRS 1	JUN	640 m	MPC · JPL
667212	2011 CF_{84}	—	February 26, 2011	Mount Lemmon	Mount Lemmon Survey	·	1.1 km	MPC · JPL
667213	2011 CU_{84}	—	February 10, 2011	Mount Lemmon	Mount Lemmon Survey	·	1.3 km	MPC · JPL
667214	2011 CO_{85}	—	February 5, 2011	Haleakala	Pan-STARRS 1	·	1.0 km	MPC · JPL
667215	2011 CR_{88}	—	March 11, 2007	Catalina	CSS	·	1.7 km	MPC · JPL
667216	2011 CM_{91}	—	August 9, 2007	Dauban	C. Rinner, Kugel, F.	TIR	3.0 km	MPC · JPL
667217	2011 CT_{94}	—	February 5, 2011	Haleakala	Pan-STARRS 1	HNS	850 m	MPC · JPL
667218	2011 CX_{95}	—	February 10, 2011	Mount Lemmon	Mount Lemmon Survey	·	580 m	MPC · JPL
667219	2011 CN_{98}	—	November 24, 2009	Mount Lemmon	Mount Lemmon Survey	·	2.6 km	MPC · JPL
667220	2011 CQ_{99}	—	September 6, 2008	Kitt Peak	Spacewatch	·	2.7 km	MPC · JPL
667221	2011 CU_{99}	—	February 5, 2011	Haleakala	Pan-STARRS 1	·	1.3 km	MPC · JPL
667222	2011 CU_{108}	—	February 5, 2011	Haleakala	Pan-STARRS 1	·	1.4 km	MPC · JPL
667223	2011 CK_{113}	—	March 6, 2011	Mount Lemmon	Mount Lemmon Survey	·	2.3 km	MPC · JPL
667224	2011 CE_{115}	—	February 5, 2011	Haleakala	Pan-STARRS 1	·	1.4 km	MPC · JPL
667225	2011 CF_{118}	—	September 28, 2000	Kitt Peak	Spacewatch	EUN	880 m	MPC · JPL
667226	2011 CR_{119}	—	August 30, 2005	Kitt Peak	Spacewatch	(5)	1.1 km	MPC · JPL
667227	2011 CD_{120}	—	February 8, 2011	Mount Lemmon	Mount Lemmon Survey	·	3.3 km	MPC · JPL
667228	2011 CX_{121}	—	February 7, 2011	Mount Lemmon	Mount Lemmon Survey	URS	3.1 km	MPC · JPL
667229	2011 CC_{126}	—	January 17, 2015	Mount Lemmon	Mount Lemmon Survey	·	1.2 km	MPC · JPL
667230	2011 CY_{128}	—	February 10, 2011	Catalina	CSS	·	1.4 km	MPC · JPL
667231	2011 CX_{139}	—	January 12, 2011	Mount Lemmon	Mount Lemmon Survey	·	1.3 km	MPC · JPL
667232	2011 CB_{140}	—	February 7, 2011	Mount Lemmon	Mount Lemmon Survey	·	1.1 km	MPC · JPL
667233	2011 DT_{10}	—	February 25, 2011	Mount Lemmon	Mount Lemmon Survey	H	500 m	MPC · JPL
667234	2011 DQ_{11}	—	February 8, 2011	Mount Lemmon	Mount Lemmon Survey	·	2.4 km	MPC · JPL
667235	2011 DN_{19}	—	December 3, 2005	Mauna Kea	A. Boattini	·	2.1 km	MPC · JPL
667236	2011 DJ_{26}	—	February 27, 2006	Kitt Peak	Spacewatch	·	2.1 km	MPC · JPL
667237	2011 DX_{32}	—	February 25, 2011	Mount Lemmon	Mount Lemmon Survey	·	3.2 km	MPC · JPL
667238	2011 DY_{32}	—	September 6, 2008	Mount Lemmon	Mount Lemmon Survey	·	2.0 km	MPC · JPL
667239	2011 DO_{34}	—	October 18, 2009	Mount Lemmon	Mount Lemmon Survey	·	1.2 km	MPC · JPL
667240	2011 DJ_{35}	—	January 14, 2002	Kitt Peak	Spacewatch	·	1.3 km	MPC · JPL
667241	2011 DG_{39}	—	September 4, 2008	Kitt Peak	Spacewatch	·	2.6 km	MPC · JPL
667242	2011 DL_{43}	—	January 28, 2011	Kitt Peak	Spacewatch	·	2.9 km	MPC · JPL
667243	2011 DS_{43}	—	March 18, 2007	Kitt Peak	Spacewatch	·	1.4 km	MPC · JPL
667244	2011 DE_{48}	—	February 26, 2011	Catalina	CSS	·	3.3 km	MPC · JPL
667245	2011 DC_{50}	—	February 25, 2011	Mount Lemmon	Mount Lemmon Survey	H	470 m	MPC · JPL
667246	2011 DM_{51}	—	March 29, 2007	Kitt Peak	Spacewatch	·	1.2 km	MPC · JPL
667247	2011 DM_{53}	—	February 26, 2011	Catalina	CSS	·	1.4 km	MPC · JPL
667248	2011 DQ_{54}	—	February 25, 2011	Mount Lemmon	Mount Lemmon Survey	·	2.2 km	MPC · JPL
667249	2011 DR_{56}	—	February 23, 2011	Catalina	CSS	·	2.2 km	MPC · JPL
667250	2011 EQ_{3}	—	November 10, 2009	Mount Lemmon	Mount Lemmon Survey	·	640 m	MPC · JPL
667251	2011 ET_{3}	—	March 1, 2011	Mount Lemmon	Mount Lemmon Survey	JUN	670 m	MPC · JPL
667252	2011 EE_{8}	—	October 23, 2003	Apache Point	SDSS Collaboration	·	3.0 km	MPC · JPL
667253	2011 ES_{9}	—	May 13, 2008	Kitt Peak	Spacewatch	·	520 m	MPC · JPL
667254	2011 EH_{10}	—	February 10, 2011	Mount Lemmon	Mount Lemmon Survey	·	1.2 km	MPC · JPL
667255	2011 EG_{17}	—	March 6, 2011	Kitt Peak	Spacewatch	APO · PHA	260 m	MPC · JPL
667256	2011 EO_{18}	—	August 26, 2003	Cerro Tololo	Deep Ecliptic Survey	·	2.7 km	MPC · JPL
667257	2011 EK_{21}	—	October 1, 2008	Mount Lemmon	Mount Lemmon Survey	·	2.8 km	MPC · JPL
667258	2011 ES_{21}	—	August 28, 2003	Palomar	NEAT	EOS	2.1 km	MPC · JPL
667259	2011 EW_{24}	—	February 10, 2007	Palomar	NEAT	NYS	1.3 km	MPC · JPL
667260	2011 EB_{30}	—	February 26, 2011	Mount Lemmon	Mount Lemmon Survey	EOS	1.9 km	MPC · JPL
667261	2011 EO_{31}	—	February 8, 2011	Mount Lemmon	Mount Lemmon Survey	·	1.3 km	MPC · JPL
667262	2011 EU_{31}	—	September 21, 2009	Mount Lemmon	Mount Lemmon Survey	EOS	2.0 km	MPC · JPL
667263	2011 EB_{33}	—	August 11, 1997	Kitt Peak	Spacewatch	·	1.5 km	MPC · JPL
667264	2011 EO_{35}	—	February 25, 2011	Mount Lemmon	Mount Lemmon Survey	·	1.3 km	MPC · JPL
667265	2011 EW_{37}	—	March 6, 2011	Kitt Peak	Spacewatch	·	690 m	MPC · JPL
667266	2011 ER_{43}	—	March 6, 2011	Mount Lemmon	Mount Lemmon Survey	HNS	1.2 km	MPC · JPL
667267	2011 EF_{48}	—	March 9, 2011	Mount Lemmon	Mount Lemmon Survey	·	1.6 km	MPC · JPL
667268	2011 ET_{51}	—	March 11, 2011	Mayhill-ISON	L. Elenin	H	400 m	MPC · JPL
667269	2011 EE_{52}	—	February 11, 2011	Mount Lemmon	Mount Lemmon Survey	·	1.1 km	MPC · JPL
667270	2011 ER_{53}	—	March 9, 2011	Kitt Peak	Spacewatch	·	2.0 km	MPC · JPL
667271	2011 EE_{61}	—	March 12, 2011	Mount Lemmon	Mount Lemmon Survey	·	2.7 km	MPC · JPL
667272	2011 EF_{61}	—	March 15, 2007	Kitt Peak	Spacewatch	HNS	980 m	MPC · JPL
667273	2011 EH_{63}	—	September 30, 2003	Apache Point	SDSS Collaboration	EOS	1.8 km	MPC · JPL
667274	2011 EG_{66}	—	September 27, 2008	Mount Lemmon	Mount Lemmon Survey	VER	2.7 km	MPC · JPL
667275	2011 EU_{77}	—	March 10, 2011	Kitt Peak	Spacewatch	H	450 m	MPC · JPL
667276	2011 EQ_{79}	—	December 15, 2001	Apache Point	SDSS	·	1.5 km	MPC · JPL
667277	2011 EF_{81}	—	March 12, 2000	Kitt Peak	Spacewatch	·	2.8 km	MPC · JPL
667278	2011 EX_{82}	—	March 11, 2011	Mount Lemmon	Mount Lemmon Survey	·	3.5 km	MPC · JPL
667279	2011 EO_{86}	—	February 5, 2011	Mount Lemmon	Mount Lemmon Survey	H	470 m	MPC · JPL
667280	2011 EP_{88}	—	March 10, 2011	Kitt Peak	Spacewatch	H	350 m	MPC · JPL
667281	2011 ES_{88}	—	March 10, 2011	Kitt Peak	Spacewatch	EUN	840 m	MPC · JPL
667282	2011 EJ_{90}	—	March 2, 2011	Mount Lemmon	Mount Lemmon Survey	·	2.7 km	MPC · JPL
667283	2011 EX_{90}	—	March 5, 2011	Mount Lemmon	Mount Lemmon Survey	·	1.3 km	MPC · JPL
667284	2011 EO_{91}	—	August 12, 2013	Haleakala	Pan-STARRS 1	·	1.2 km	MPC · JPL
667285	2011 ET_{91}	—	March 9, 2011	Mount Lemmon	Mount Lemmon Survey	·	1.8 km	MPC · JPL
667286	2011 EM_{92}	—	August 29, 2013	Črni Vrh	Vales, J.	·	3.4 km	MPC · JPL
667287	2011 EU_{95}	—	September 6, 2013	Catalina	CSS	·	1.9 km	MPC · JPL
667288	2011 EX_{95}	—	March 11, 2011	Mount Lemmon	Mount Lemmon Survey	·	1.6 km	MPC · JPL
667289	2011 EO_{97}	—	March 2, 2011	Kitt Peak	Spacewatch	·	1.2 km	MPC · JPL
667290	2011 ER_{97}	—	March 11, 2011	Kitt Peak	Spacewatch	H	420 m	MPC · JPL
667291	2011 EV_{101}	—	March 9, 2011	Mount Lemmon	Mount Lemmon Survey	·	1.1 km	MPC · JPL
667292	2011 EO_{107}	—	March 11, 2011	Kitt Peak	Spacewatch	·	650 m	MPC · JPL
667293	2011 FQ	—	March 22, 2011	Bergisch Gladbach	W. Bickel	·	700 m	MPC · JPL
667294 Missen	2011 FX_{17}	Missen	March 28, 2011	Nogales	M. Ory	·	660 m	MPC · JPL
667295	2011 FO_{19}	—	February 8, 2002	Palomar	NEAT	·	1.4 km	MPC · JPL
667296	2011 FW_{19}	—	March 29, 2011	Kitt Peak	Spacewatch	·	540 m	MPC · JPL
667297	2011 FN_{20}	—	April 8, 2006	Kitt Peak	Spacewatch	THM	2.3 km	MPC · JPL
667298	2011 FX_{21}	—	March 26, 2011	Mount Lemmon	Mount Lemmon Survey	VER	3.1 km	MPC · JPL
667299	2011 FP_{23}	—	March 27, 2011	Kitt Peak	Spacewatch	·	1.4 km	MPC · JPL
667300	2011 FA_{25}	—	November 20, 2008	Kitt Peak	Spacewatch	·	3.3 km	MPC · JPL

== 667301–667400 ==
back to top

Designation			Discovery			Properties		Ref
Permanent	Provisional	Named after	Date	Site	Discoverer(s)	Category	Diam.	Ref
667301	2011 FD_{25}	—	August 12, 2004	Cerro Tololo	Deep Ecliptic Survey	·	1.3 km	MPC · JPL
667302	2011 FZ_{27}	—	March 24, 2011	Catalina	CSS	·	1.3 km	MPC · JPL
667303	2011 FR_{29}	—	March 30, 2011	Haleakala	Pan-STARRS 1	APO	170 m	MPC · JPL
667304	2011 FE_{36}	—	July 5, 2005	Mount Lemmon	Mount Lemmon Survey	·	580 m	MPC · JPL
667305	2011 FG_{39}	—	March 13, 2011	Kitt Peak	Spacewatch	·	1.2 km	MPC · JPL
667306	2011 FN_{40}	—	March 30, 2011	Piszkés-tető	K. Sárneczky, Z. Kuli	EOS	1.7 km	MPC · JPL
667307	2011 FF_{42}	—	March 26, 2011	Mount Lemmon	Mount Lemmon Survey	·	4.1 km	MPC · JPL
667308	2011 FN_{43}	—	April 16, 2007	Needville	J. Dellinger, W. G. Dillon	·	1.5 km	MPC · JPL
667309	2011 FR_{44}	—	February 25, 2011	Kitt Peak	Spacewatch	·	1.2 km	MPC · JPL
667310	2011 FU_{54}	—	March 29, 2011	Mount Lemmon	Mount Lemmon Survey	MAS	810 m	MPC · JPL
667311	2011 FZ_{54}	—	March 4, 2011	Kitt Peak	Spacewatch	H	320 m	MPC · JPL
667312	2011 FH_{55}	—	December 27, 2006	Mount Lemmon	Mount Lemmon Survey	MAS	630 m	MPC · JPL
667313	2011 FS_{57}	—	March 14, 2015	Haleakala	Pan-STARRS 1	·	1.3 km	MPC · JPL
667314	2011 FY_{57}	—	March 30, 2011	Mount Lemmon	Mount Lemmon Survey	·	1.9 km	MPC · JPL
667315	2011 FC_{61}	—	March 29, 2011	Mount Lemmon	Mount Lemmon Survey	·	1.5 km	MPC · JPL
667316	2011 FF_{62}	—	March 30, 2011	Mount Lemmon	Mount Lemmon Survey	·	1.4 km	MPC · JPL
667317	2011 FK_{65}	—	October 16, 2009	Catalina	CSS	JUN	910 m	MPC · JPL
667318	2011 FB_{66}	—	March 30, 2011	Mount Lemmon	Mount Lemmon Survey	·	1.3 km	MPC · JPL
667319	2011 FM_{68}	—	March 27, 2011	Mount Lemmon	Mount Lemmon Survey	EOS	1.9 km	MPC · JPL
667320	2011 FA_{71}	—	September 25, 2009	Kitt Peak	Spacewatch	·	510 m	MPC · JPL
667321	2011 FP_{72}	—	January 8, 2011	Mount Lemmon	Mount Lemmon Survey	·	910 m	MPC · JPL
667322	2011 FR_{82}	—	March 14, 2011	Kitt Peak	Spacewatch	·	1.3 km	MPC · JPL
667323	2011 FG_{83}	—	March 10, 2011	Kitt Peak	Spacewatch	VER	2.5 km	MPC · JPL
667324	2011 FN_{84}	—	March 25, 2011	Haleakala	Pan-STARRS 1	·	740 m	MPC · JPL
667325	2011 FT_{84}	—	March 26, 2011	Mount Lemmon	Mount Lemmon Survey	·	1.4 km	MPC · JPL
667326	2011 FQ_{85}	—	October 24, 2009	Kitt Peak	Spacewatch	·	890 m	MPC · JPL
667327	2011 FS_{96}	—	March 29, 2011	Mount Lemmon	Mount Lemmon Survey	·	1.5 km	MPC · JPL
667328	2011 FQ_{98}	—	August 26, 2005	Palomar	NEAT	·	670 m	MPC · JPL
667329	2011 FG_{104}	—	February 8, 2011	Mount Lemmon	Mount Lemmon Survey	HNS	940 m	MPC · JPL
667330	2011 FJ_{104}	—	December 18, 2004	Mount Lemmon	Mount Lemmon Survey	·	2.6 km	MPC · JPL
667331	2011 FY_{105}	—	April 5, 2011	Mount Lemmon	Mount Lemmon Survey	·	1.4 km	MPC · JPL
667332	2011 FG_{112}	—	November 20, 2003	Kitt Peak	Spacewatch	·	2.5 km	MPC · JPL
667333	2011 FE_{121}	—	February 9, 2005	Kitt Peak	Spacewatch	·	3.0 km	MPC · JPL
667334	2011 FU_{127}	—	July 31, 2009	Kitt Peak	Spacewatch	H	530 m	MPC · JPL
667335	2011 FX_{131}	—	October 11, 2001	Palomar	NEAT	·	1.1 km	MPC · JPL
667336	2011 FA_{135}	—	March 28, 2011	Mount Lemmon	Mount Lemmon Survey	·	1.3 km	MPC · JPL
667337	2011 FP_{141}	—	March 26, 2011	Mount Lemmon	Mount Lemmon Survey	·	1.2 km	MPC · JPL
667338	2011 FG_{143}	—	February 16, 2007	Catalina	CSS	V	780 m	MPC · JPL
667339	2011 FR_{146}	—	March 1, 2011	Catalina	CSS	·	1.6 km	MPC · JPL
667340	2011 FM_{149}	—	March 30, 2011	Piszkés-tető	K. Sárneczky, Z. Kuli	·	1.9 km	MPC · JPL
667341	2011 FZ_{153}	—	March 27, 2011	Kitt Peak	Spacewatch	·	610 m	MPC · JPL
667342	2011 FV_{155}	—	November 3, 2008	Mount Lemmon	Mount Lemmon Survey	·	3.6 km	MPC · JPL
667343	2011 FB_{160}	—	October 13, 2013	Nogales	M. Schwartz, P. R. Holvorcem	·	1.5 km	MPC · JPL
667344	2011 FF_{160}	—	March 29, 2011	Catalina	CSS	EUN	1.1 km	MPC · JPL
667345	2011 FS_{161}	—	June 28, 2016	Haleakala	Pan-STARRS 1	·	1.2 km	MPC · JPL
667346	2011 FV_{161}	—	January 28, 2015	Haleakala	Pan-STARRS 1	·	1.0 km	MPC · JPL
667347	2011 FZ_{161}	—	October 4, 2013	Mount Lemmon	Mount Lemmon Survey	·	1.6 km	MPC · JPL
667348	2011 FS_{163}	—	July 23, 2015	Haleakala	Pan-STARRS 2	·	640 m	MPC · JPL
667349	2011 FC_{164}	—	October 12, 2013	Catalina	CSS	·	1.9 km	MPC · JPL
667350	2011 FL_{164}	—	March 29, 2015	Haleakala	Pan-STARRS 1	·	850 m	MPC · JPL
667351	2011 FH_{165}	—	March 26, 2011	Kitt Peak	Spacewatch	·	550 m	MPC · JPL
667352	2011 FD_{166}	—	December 22, 2016	Haleakala	Pan-STARRS 1	·	470 m	MPC · JPL
667353	2011 FW_{166}	—	January 2, 2014	Kitt Peak	Spacewatch	·	550 m	MPC · JPL
667354	2011 FH_{168}	—	March 26, 2011	Mount Lemmon	Mount Lemmon Survey	EUN	910 m	MPC · JPL
667355	2011 FL_{168}	—	March 26, 2011	Mount Lemmon	Mount Lemmon Survey	·	1.7 km	MPC · JPL
667356	2011 FU_{169}	—	March 29, 2011	Kitt Peak	Spacewatch	·	600 m	MPC · JPL
667357	2011 FA_{170}	—	March 26, 2011	Kitt Peak	Spacewatch	·	540 m	MPC · JPL
667358	2011 GS	—	March 11, 2011	Kitt Peak	Spacewatch	·	1.6 km	MPC · JPL
667359	2011 GU_{4}	—	April 1, 2011	Mount Lemmon	Mount Lemmon Survey	·	1.7 km	MPC · JPL
667360	2011 GS_{6}	—	October 1, 2005	Kitt Peak	Spacewatch	V	640 m	MPC · JPL
667361	2011 GH_{7}	—	April 2, 2011	Mount Lemmon	Mount Lemmon Survey	·	1.2 km	MPC · JPL
667362	2011 GB_{9}	—	November 8, 2008	Mount Lemmon	Mount Lemmon Survey	·	2.9 km	MPC · JPL
667363	2011 GS_{10}	—	October 26, 2009	Mount Lemmon	Mount Lemmon Survey	·	520 m	MPC · JPL
667364	2011 GP_{11}	—	April 1, 2011	Mount Lemmon	Mount Lemmon Survey	·	1.8 km	MPC · JPL
667365	2011 GW_{14}	—	April 1, 2011	Mount Lemmon	Mount Lemmon Survey	·	1.3 km	MPC · JPL
667366	2011 GZ_{14}	—	September 13, 2007	Kitt Peak	Spacewatch	·	2.8 km	MPC · JPL
667367	2011 GD_{25}	—	April 4, 2011	Mount Lemmon	Mount Lemmon Survey	HNS	850 m	MPC · JPL
667368	2011 GT_{25}	—	April 4, 2011	Mount Lemmon	Mount Lemmon Survey	GAL	1.2 km	MPC · JPL
667369	2011 GD_{28}	—	November 11, 2006	Mount Lemmon	Mount Lemmon Survey	·	660 m	MPC · JPL
667370	2011 GO_{30}	—	August 22, 2003	Haleakala	NEAT	·	1.6 km	MPC · JPL
667371	2011 GP_{31}	—	April 1, 2011	Mount Lemmon	Mount Lemmon Survey	·	1.3 km	MPC · JPL
667372	2011 GE_{36}	—	July 16, 2004	Cerro Tololo	Deep Ecliptic Survey	·	1.2 km	MPC · JPL
667373	2011 GC_{37}	—	February 11, 2002	Socorro	LINEAR	·	1.3 km	MPC · JPL
667374	2011 GS_{37}	—	March 24, 2011	Catalina	CSS	H	380 m	MPC · JPL
667375	2011 GM_{41}	—	April 5, 2011	Catalina	CSS	·	1.8 km	MPC · JPL
667376	2011 GB_{42}	—	April 5, 2011	Mount Lemmon	Mount Lemmon Survey	·	1.2 km	MPC · JPL
667377	2011 GD_{44}	—	August 23, 2008	Siding Spring	SSS	·	3.6 km	MPC · JPL
667378	2011 GN_{45}	—	April 5, 2011	Mount Lemmon	Mount Lemmon Survey	·	4.1 km	MPC · JPL
667379	2011 GT_{51}	—	August 19, 2001	Cerro Tololo	Deep Ecliptic Survey	HYG	2.5 km	MPC · JPL
667380	2011 GF_{52}	—	April 5, 2011	Mount Lemmon	Mount Lemmon Survey	VER	3.0 km	MPC · JPL
667381	2011 GV_{58}	—	January 12, 2003	Kitt Peak	Spacewatch	·	1.0 km	MPC · JPL
667382	2011 GU_{59}	—	October 21, 1995	Kitt Peak	Spacewatch	·	840 m	MPC · JPL
667383	2011 GU_{64}	—	April 13, 2011	Haleakala	Pan-STARRS 1	H	420 m	MPC · JPL
667384	2011 GP_{68}	—	March 25, 2007	Mount Lemmon	Mount Lemmon Survey	EUN	1.3 km	MPC · JPL
667385	2011 GC_{71}	—	April 13, 2011	Mount Lemmon	Mount Lemmon Survey	H	390 m	MPC · JPL
667386	2011 GW_{72}	—	April 28, 2000	Kitt Peak	Spacewatch	NYS	1.1 km	MPC · JPL
667387	2011 GR_{74}	—	February 22, 2003	Anderson Mesa	LONEOS	·	1.4 km	MPC · JPL
667388	2011 GN_{77}	—	April 13, 2011	Mount Lemmon	Mount Lemmon Survey	·	610 m	MPC · JPL
667389	2011 GR_{77}	—	April 14, 2011	Mount Lemmon	Mount Lemmon Survey	·	600 m	MPC · JPL
667390	2011 GS_{78}	—	April 11, 2011	Črni Vrh	Mikuž, B.	·	1.9 km	MPC · JPL
667391	2011 GY_{81}	—	April 13, 2011	Haleakala	Pan-STARRS 1	·	1.3 km	MPC · JPL
667392	2011 GS_{83}	—	March 27, 2011	Mount Lemmon	Mount Lemmon Survey	·	1.7 km	MPC · JPL
667393	2011 GS_{85}	—	April 1, 2011	Kitt Peak	Spacewatch	·	1.5 km	MPC · JPL
667394	2011 GC_{86}	—	March 10, 2005	Mount Lemmon	Mount Lemmon Survey	·	2.7 km	MPC · JPL
667395	2011 GJ_{90}	—	April 6, 2011	Mount Lemmon	Mount Lemmon Survey	·	1.7 km	MPC · JPL
667396	2011 GQ_{91}	—	April 13, 2011	Kitt Peak	Spacewatch	·	1.4 km	MPC · JPL
667397	2011 GS_{91}	—	April 1, 2011	Kitt Peak	Spacewatch	·	1.4 km	MPC · JPL
667398	2011 GY_{91}	—	January 22, 2015	Haleakala	Pan-STARRS 1	TIN	950 m	MPC · JPL
667399	2011 GF_{92}	—	April 5, 2011	Kitt Peak	Spacewatch	(1547)	1.1 km	MPC · JPL
667400	2011 GJ_{92}	—	January 23, 2015	Haleakala	Pan-STARRS 1	·	1.3 km	MPC · JPL

== 667401–667500 ==
back to top

Designation			Discovery			Properties		Ref
Permanent	Provisional	Named after	Date	Site	Discoverer(s)	Category	Diam.	Ref
667401	2011 GK_{92}	—	April 3, 2011	Haleakala	Pan-STARRS 1	·	520 m	MPC · JPL
667402	2011 GZ_{93}	—	April 11, 2011	Mount Lemmon	Mount Lemmon Survey	H	400 m	MPC · JPL
667403	2011 GP_{95}	—	April 13, 2011	Mount Lemmon	Mount Lemmon Survey	·	3.8 km	MPC · JPL
667404	2011 GS_{100}	—	April 3, 2011	Haleakala	Pan-STARRS 1	·	1.3 km	MPC · JPL
667405	2011 GT_{100}	—	April 13, 2011	Kitt Peak	Spacewatch	·	1.5 km	MPC · JPL
667406	2011 GV_{100}	—	April 2, 2011	Haleakala	Pan-STARRS 1	EUN	1.1 km	MPC · JPL
667407	2011 GZ_{100}	—	April 13, 2011	Haleakala	Pan-STARRS 1	·	1.5 km	MPC · JPL
667408	2011 GC_{101}	—	April 5, 2011	Kitt Peak	Spacewatch	·	1.4 km	MPC · JPL
667409	2011 GF_{101}	—	April 1, 2011	Mount Lemmon	Mount Lemmon Survey	EUN	1.1 km	MPC · JPL
667410	2011 GL_{101}	—	September 30, 2003	Kitt Peak	Spacewatch	·	1.4 km	MPC · JPL
667411	2011 GD_{102}	—	April 3, 2011	Haleakala	Pan-STARRS 1	·	520 m	MPC · JPL
667412	2011 GY_{103}	—	April 1, 2011	Kitt Peak	Spacewatch	·	440 m	MPC · JPL
667413	2011 GJ_{104}	—	April 1, 2011	Kitt Peak	Spacewatch	·	520 m	MPC · JPL
667414	2011 GV_{105}	—	April 2, 2011	Kitt Peak	Spacewatch	·	1.3 km	MPC · JPL
667415	2011 HY_{4}	—	April 23, 2011	Kitt Peak	Spacewatch	·	1.5 km	MPC · JPL
667416	2011 HF_{7}	—	March 2, 2011	Kitt Peak	Spacewatch	·	530 m	MPC · JPL
667417	2011 HZ_{10}	—	February 20, 2002	Kitt Peak	Spacewatch	·	900 m	MPC · JPL
667418	2011 HA_{13}	—	April 23, 2011	Kitt Peak	Spacewatch	·	1.6 km	MPC · JPL
667419	2011 HO_{13}	—	October 28, 2005	Mount Lemmon	Mount Lemmon Survey	·	1.2 km	MPC · JPL
667420	2011 HZ_{18}	—	April 26, 2011	Mount Lemmon	Mount Lemmon Survey	·	1.5 km	MPC · JPL
667421	2011 HK_{22}	—	March 26, 2011	Kitt Peak	Spacewatch	·	1.2 km	MPC · JPL
667422	2011 HQ_{23}	—	April 7, 2007	Mount Lemmon	Mount Lemmon Survey	·	1.1 km	MPC · JPL
667423	2011 HX_{27}	—	April 23, 2011	Catalina	CSS	·	2.1 km	MPC · JPL
667424	2011 HM_{28}	—	March 28, 2011	Kitt Peak	Spacewatch	·	1.5 km	MPC · JPL
667425	2011 HQ_{33}	—	April 2, 2011	Kitt Peak	Spacewatch	·	570 m	MPC · JPL
667426	2011 HB_{34}	—	April 27, 2011	Haleakala	Pan-STARRS 1	VER	3.1 km	MPC · JPL
667427	2011 HV_{34}	—	April 28, 2011	Haleakala	Pan-STARRS 1	·	1.9 km	MPC · JPL
667428	2011 HO_{35}	—	September 4, 2008	Kitt Peak	Spacewatch	·	1.5 km	MPC · JPL
667429	2011 HQ_{40}	—	April 26, 2011	Mount Lemmon	Mount Lemmon Survey	·	1.8 km	MPC · JPL
667430	2011 HX_{41}	—	March 12, 2000	Kitt Peak	Spacewatch	·	3.2 km	MPC · JPL
667431	2011 HP_{42}	—	April 11, 2011	Mount Lemmon	Mount Lemmon Survey	·	2.5 km	MPC · JPL
667432	2011 HC_{45}	—	April 27, 2011	Haleakala	Pan-STARRS 1	·	1.4 km	MPC · JPL
667433	2011 HM_{46}	—	April 6, 2011	Mount Lemmon	Mount Lemmon Survey	·	1.5 km	MPC · JPL
667434	2011 HL_{49}	—	September 11, 2007	Kitt Peak	Spacewatch	DOR	2.0 km	MPC · JPL
667435	2011 HF_{55}	—	May 6, 2002	Palomar	NEAT	·	2.2 km	MPC · JPL
667436	2011 HT_{58}	—	October 23, 2008	Mount Lemmon	Mount Lemmon Survey	·	1.9 km	MPC · JPL
667437	2011 HC_{61}	—	April 24, 2007	Kitt Peak	Spacewatch	EUN	1.4 km	MPC · JPL
667438	2011 HP_{63}	—	April 2, 2011	Kitt Peak	Spacewatch	·	510 m	MPC · JPL
667439	2011 HB_{64}	—	February 13, 2002	Apache Point	SDSS Collaboration	·	1.4 km	MPC · JPL
667440	2011 HX_{64}	—	April 1, 2003	Apache Point	SDSS	·	1.4 km	MPC · JPL
667441	2011 HZ_{65}	—	April 22, 2011	Kitt Peak	Spacewatch	·	1.3 km	MPC · JPL
667442	2011 HM_{66}	—	April 2, 2011	Kitt Peak	Spacewatch	·	1.2 km	MPC · JPL
667443	2011 HQ_{66}	—	January 30, 2011	Haleakala	Pan-STARRS 1	T_{j} (2.97) · 3:2	5.4 km	MPC · JPL
667444	2011 HL_{69}	—	April 23, 2011	Haleakala	Pan-STARRS 1	·	740 m	MPC · JPL
667445	2011 HY_{78}	—	April 30, 2011	Haleakala	Pan-STARRS 1	·	2.9 km	MPC · JPL
667446	2011 HA_{86}	—	March 27, 2011	Mount Lemmon	Mount Lemmon Survey	·	1.3 km	MPC · JPL
667447	2011 HE_{87}	—	October 24, 2005	Mauna Kea	A. Boattini	·	2.0 km	MPC · JPL
667448	2011 HN_{87}	—	April 6, 2011	Mount Lemmon	Mount Lemmon Survey	·	1.8 km	MPC · JPL
667449	2011 HG_{88}	—	April 28, 2011	Mount Lemmon	Mount Lemmon Survey	·	950 m	MPC · JPL
667450	2011 HB_{90}	—	April 30, 2011	Haleakala	Pan-STARRS 1	·	1.6 km	MPC · JPL
667451	2011 HH_{96}	—	April 14, 2007	Mount Lemmon	Mount Lemmon Survey	·	1.4 km	MPC · JPL
667452	2011 HY_{99}	—	April 26, 2011	Kitt Peak	Spacewatch	·	620 m	MPC · JPL
667453	2011 HQ_{104}	—	March 21, 2015	Haleakala	Pan-STARRS 1	EUN	960 m	MPC · JPL
667454	2011 HA_{105}	—	April 30, 2011	Haleakala	Pan-STARRS 1	·	2.2 km	MPC · JPL
667455	2011 HO_{105}	—	October 8, 2013	Mount Lemmon	Mount Lemmon Survey	·	1.9 km	MPC · JPL
667456	2011 HY_{105}	—	September 7, 2008	Mount Lemmon	Mount Lemmon Survey	·	480 m	MPC · JPL
667457	2011 HX_{108}	—	October 5, 2013	Haleakala	Pan-STARRS 1	·	1.4 km	MPC · JPL
667458	2011 HM_{111}	—	April 28, 2011	Haleakala	Pan-STARRS 1	·	610 m	MPC · JPL
667459	2011 JH	—	October 18, 2009	Catalina	CSS	H	500 m	MPC · JPL
667460	2011 JS_{2}	—	May 1, 2011	Haleakala	Pan-STARRS 1	H	380 m	MPC · JPL
667461	2011 JE_{3}	—	March 10, 2011	Catalina	CSS	·	1.6 km	MPC · JPL
667462	2011 JT_{4}	—	August 20, 2008	Kitt Peak	Spacewatch	·	600 m	MPC · JPL
667463	2011 JO_{7}	—	May 6, 2011	Kitt Peak	Spacewatch	·	570 m	MPC · JPL
667464	2011 JE_{11}	—	January 8, 2010	Kitt Peak	Spacewatch	·	1.5 km	MPC · JPL
667465	2011 JQ_{11}	—	March 2, 2011	Mount Lemmon	Mount Lemmon Survey	RAF	970 m	MPC · JPL
667466	2011 JY_{15}	—	May 14, 2011	Siding Spring	SSS	·	2.2 km	MPC · JPL
667467	2011 JR_{16}	—	November 9, 2009	Mount Lemmon	Mount Lemmon Survey	·	1.6 km	MPC · JPL
667468	2011 JC_{21}	—	April 24, 2011	Kitt Peak	Spacewatch	·	1.1 km	MPC · JPL
667469	2011 JE_{21}	—	May 8, 2011	Kitt Peak	Spacewatch	DOR	2.0 km	MPC · JPL
667470	2011 JU_{21}	—	May 12, 2007	Mount Lemmon	Mount Lemmon Survey	·	1.1 km	MPC · JPL
667471	2011 JP_{24}	—	September 25, 2009	Kitt Peak	Spacewatch	·	1.1 km	MPC · JPL
667472	2011 JH_{27}	—	January 30, 2011	Haleakala	Pan-STARRS 1	·	3.9 km	MPC · JPL
667473	2011 JZ_{29}	—	May 3, 2011	Kitt Peak	Spacewatch	·	410 m	MPC · JPL
667474	2011 JX_{31}	—	May 2, 2011	Las Campanas	New Horizons KBO Search	cubewano (cold)	130 km	MPC · JPL
667475	2011 JE_{33}	—	May 7, 2011	Kitt Peak	Spacewatch	·	640 m	MPC · JPL
667476	2011 JK_{36}	—	October 20, 2012	Mount Lemmon	Mount Lemmon Survey	·	550 m	MPC · JPL
667477	2011 JS_{36}	—	May 9, 2011	Mount Lemmon	Mount Lemmon Survey	·	1.7 km	MPC · JPL
667478	2011 JX_{36}	—	May 8, 2011	Mount Lemmon	Mount Lemmon Survey	MRX	950 m	MPC · JPL
667479	2011 JN_{37}	—	April 29, 2011	Mount Bigelow	CSS	·	2.0 km	MPC · JPL
667480	2011 JH_{38}	—	May 12, 2011	Mount Lemmon	Mount Lemmon Survey	·	1.5 km	MPC · JPL
667481	2011 KY	—	April 8, 2003	Palomar	NEAT	·	1.2 km	MPC · JPL
667482	2011 KG_{2}	—	January 23, 2006	Mount Lemmon	Mount Lemmon Survey	·	1.4 km	MPC · JPL
667483	2011 KY_{2}	—	October 20, 2003	Kitt Peak	Spacewatch	·	2.1 km	MPC · JPL
667484	2011 KW_{7}	—	April 30, 2011	Mount Lemmon	Mount Lemmon Survey	·	1.4 km	MPC · JPL
667485	2011 KP_{10}	—	March 16, 2002	Haleakala	NEAT	EUN	1.3 km	MPC · JPL
667486	2011 KC_{17}	—	May 24, 2011	Nogales	M. Schwartz, P. R. Holvorcem	H	610 m	MPC · JPL
667487	2011 KW_{17}	—	May 24, 2011	Haleakala	Pan-STARRS 1	·	670 m	MPC · JPL
667488	2011 KQ_{18}	—	May 27, 2011	Kitt Peak	Spacewatch	H	420 m	MPC · JPL
667489	2011 KO_{20}	—	May 25, 2011	Mount Lemmon	Mount Lemmon Survey	·	1.6 km	MPC · JPL
667490	2011 KD_{23}	—	May 14, 2011	Mount Lemmon	Mount Lemmon Survey	·	1.1 km	MPC · JPL
667491	2011 KT_{23}	—	April 30, 2011	Haleakala	Pan-STARRS 1	·	1.7 km	MPC · JPL
667492	2011 KV_{24}	—	October 20, 2003	Kitt Peak	Spacewatch	·	1.8 km	MPC · JPL
667493	2011 KL_{25}	—	September 30, 2005	Mount Lemmon	Mount Lemmon Survey	·	990 m	MPC · JPL
667494	2011 KX_{32}	—	May 31, 2011	Mount Lemmon	Mount Lemmon Survey	·	1.2 km	MPC · JPL
667495	2011 KK_{36}	—	May 29, 2011	Mount Lemmon	Mount Lemmon Survey	H	440 m	MPC · JPL
667496	2011 KC_{39}	—	July 16, 2004	Cerro Tololo	Deep Ecliptic Survey	3:2 · SHU	4.4 km	MPC · JPL
667497	2011 KY_{41}	—	October 6, 2008	Mount Lemmon	Mount Lemmon Survey	·	1.4 km	MPC · JPL
667498	2011 KF_{45}	—	May 21, 2011	Haleakala	Pan-STARRS 1	·	510 m	MPC · JPL
667499	2011 KS_{48}	—	April 25, 2007	Vail-Jarnac	Jarnac	·	1.5 km	MPC · JPL
667500	2011 KX_{51}	—	May 28, 2011	Mount Lemmon	Mount Lemmon Survey	·	450 m	MPC · JPL

== 667501–667600 ==
back to top

Designation			Discovery			Properties		Ref
Permanent	Provisional	Named after	Date	Site	Discoverer(s)	Category	Diam.	Ref
667501	2011 KF_{56}	—	May 21, 2011	Mount Lemmon	Mount Lemmon Survey	·	1.1 km	MPC · JPL
667502	2011 KQ_{56}	—	July 29, 2008	Kitt Peak	Spacewatch	·	380 m	MPC · JPL
667503	2011 KN_{58}	—	May 21, 2011	Haleakala	Pan-STARRS 1	·	430 m	MPC · JPL
667504	2011 LF	—	June 2, 2011	Siding Spring	SSS	T_{j} (2.99)	2.2 km	MPC · JPL
667505	2011 LE_{5}	—	May 23, 2011	Nogales	M. Schwartz, P. R. Holvorcem	·	2.2 km	MPC · JPL
667506	2011 LE_{6}	—	June 4, 2011	Mount Lemmon	Mount Lemmon Survey	·	510 m	MPC · JPL
667507	2011 LS_{6}	—	May 28, 2001	Kitt Peak	Spacewatch	·	560 m	MPC · JPL
667508	2011 LA_{10}	—	June 6, 2011	Haleakala	Pan-STARRS 1	·	1.8 km	MPC · JPL
667509	2011 LJ_{10}	—	June 4, 2011	Mount Lemmon	Mount Lemmon Survey	·	1.8 km	MPC · JPL
667510	2011 LT_{10}	—	June 6, 2011	Haleakala	Pan-STARRS 1	H	390 m	MPC · JPL
667511	2011 LQ_{14}	—	June 5, 2011	Kitt Peak	Spacewatch	HNS	1.3 km	MPC · JPL
667512	2011 LD_{25}	—	February 6, 2006	Catalina	CSS	·	2.2 km	MPC · JPL
667513	2011 LY_{26}	—	July 25, 2003	Palomar	NEAT	·	2.2 km	MPC · JPL
667514 Pozonuñez	2011 LZ_{31}	Pozonuñez	June 4, 2011	Cerro Tololo	EURONEAR	·	720 m	MPC · JPL
667515 Truța	2011 LB_{35}	Truța	June 4, 2011	Cerro Tololo	EURONEAR	·	810 m	MPC · JPL
667516	2011 LN_{35}	—	June 12, 2011	Mount Lemmon	Mount Lemmon Survey	·	590 m	MPC · JPL
667517	2011 MF_{4}	—	June 25, 2011	Mount Lemmon	Mount Lemmon Survey	EUN	1.3 km	MPC · JPL
667518	2011 ME_{6}	—	September 12, 2007	Kitt Peak	Spacewatch	·	1.4 km	MPC · JPL
667519	2011 MZ_{7}	—	September 27, 2003	Apache Point	SDSS Collaboration	·	2.7 km	MPC · JPL
667520	2011 MU_{8}	—	August 27, 2003	Palomar	NEAT	·	1.8 km	MPC · JPL
667521	2011 MF_{9}	—	June 27, 2011	Mount Lemmon	Mount Lemmon Survey	PHO	1.9 km	MPC · JPL
667522	2011 MV_{11}	—	June 30, 2011	Haleakala	Pan-STARRS 1	SDO	225 km	MPC · JPL
667523	2011 MD_{12}	—	January 24, 2014	Haleakala	Pan-STARRS 1	EOS	1.6 km	MPC · JPL
667524	2011 ME_{12}	—	June 27, 2011	Mount Lemmon	Mount Lemmon Survey	·	1.7 km	MPC · JPL
667525	2011 MO_{12}	—	November 13, 2012	Mount Lemmon	Mount Lemmon Survey	H	450 m	MPC · JPL
667526	2011 MG_{13}	—	October 2, 2017	Haleakala	Pan-STARRS 1	·	1.9 km	MPC · JPL
667527	2011 MR_{14}	—	June 22, 2011	Mount Lemmon	Mount Lemmon Survey	·	760 m	MPC · JPL
667528	2011 NG_{2}	—	June 24, 2011	Mount Lemmon	Mount Lemmon Survey	·	1.7 km	MPC · JPL
667529	2011 NN_{4}	—	July 1, 2011	Mount Lemmon	Mount Lemmon Survey	·	750 m	MPC · JPL
667530	2011 NZ_{4}	—	July 1, 2011	Mount Lemmon	Mount Lemmon Survey	·	700 m	MPC · JPL
667531 Ignasiribas	2011 OF	Ignasiribas	July 20, 2011	Observatorio Astr	Bosch, J. M., Herrero, E.	·	420 m	MPC · JPL
667532	2011 OF_{1}	—	July 19, 2011	Haleakala	Pan-STARRS 1	PHO	690 m	MPC · JPL
667533	2011 OZ_{1}	—	July 22, 2011	Haleakala	Pan-STARRS 1	·	2.3 km	MPC · JPL
667534	2011 OA_{2}	—	July 22, 2011	Haleakala	Pan-STARRS 1	MAR	1.0 km	MPC · JPL
667535	2011 OP_{2}	—	October 2, 2006	Catalina	CSS	AEG	2.1 km	MPC · JPL
667536	2011 OZ_{2}	—	October 10, 2008	Mount Lemmon	Mount Lemmon Survey	(2076)	580 m	MPC · JPL
667537	2011 ON_{9}	—	July 27, 2011	Haleakala	Pan-STARRS 1	·	1.6 km	MPC · JPL
667538	2011 OU_{12}	—	February 16, 2007	Mount Lemmon	Mount Lemmon Survey	·	520 m	MPC · JPL
667539	2011 OX_{12}	—	October 25, 2003	Kitt Peak	Spacewatch	WIT	1.0 km	MPC · JPL
667540	2011 OO_{14}	—	May 29, 2011	ESA OGS	ESA OGS	ADE	2.1 km	MPC · JPL
667541	2011 OS_{17}	—	July 29, 2011	Sierra Stars	R. Matson	·	930 m	MPC · JPL
667542	2011 OB_{18}	—	November 22, 2006	Catalina	CSS	·	3.2 km	MPC · JPL
667543	2011 OX_{22}	—	July 26, 2011	Haleakala	Pan-STARRS 1	·	2.1 km	MPC · JPL
667544	2011 OG_{27}	—	July 28, 2011	Haleakala	Pan-STARRS 1	·	1.5 km	MPC · JPL
667545	2011 ON_{31}	—	October 26, 2008	Mount Lemmon	Mount Lemmon Survey	·	670 m	MPC · JPL
667546	2011 OV_{33}	—	June 4, 2011	Mount Lemmon	Mount Lemmon Survey	·	1.8 km	MPC · JPL
667547	2011 OS_{39}	—	July 5, 2011	Haleakala	Pan-STARRS 1	·	1.0 km	MPC · JPL
667548	2011 OW_{48}	—	January 1, 2008	Mount Lemmon	Mount Lemmon Survey	BRA	1.7 km	MPC · JPL
667549	2011 OW_{49}	—	October 27, 2008	Kitt Peak	Spacewatch	MAS	840 m	MPC · JPL
667550	2011 OG_{51}	—	July 27, 2011	Haleakala	Pan-STARRS 1	H	490 m	MPC · JPL
667551	2011 OT_{51}	—	September 30, 2002	Haleakala	NEAT	·	2.4 km	MPC · JPL
667552	2011 OK_{54}	—	November 24, 2008	Mount Lemmon	Mount Lemmon Survey	·	1.6 km	MPC · JPL
667553	2011 OE_{55}	—	July 26, 2011	Haleakala	Pan-STARRS 1	BRA	1.4 km	MPC · JPL
667554	2011 OQ_{59}	—	July 31, 2011	Haleakala	Pan-STARRS 1	·	670 m	MPC · JPL
667555	2011 OF_{61}	—	December 7, 2013	Kitt Peak	Spacewatch	·	2.0 km	MPC · JPL
667556	2011 OF_{62}	—	December 11, 2012	Mount Lemmon	Mount Lemmon Survey	·	1.5 km	MPC · JPL
667557	2011 OD_{63}	—	July 27, 2011	Haleakala	Pan-STARRS 1	·	2.2 km	MPC · JPL
667558	2011 OA_{66}	—	August 8, 2016	Haleakala	Pan-STARRS 1	·	2.0 km	MPC · JPL
667559	2011 OU_{66}	—	July 27, 2011	Haleakala	Pan-STARRS 1	·	2.6 km	MPC · JPL
667560	2011 OZ_{66}	—	March 25, 2014	Haleakala	Pan-STARRS 1	PHO	710 m	MPC · JPL
667561	2011 OA_{67}	—	July 28, 2011	Haleakala	Pan-STARRS 1	·	2.4 km	MPC · JPL
667562	2011 OW_{67}	—	July 28, 2011	Haleakala	Pan-STARRS 1	·	1.8 km	MPC · JPL
667563	2011 OK_{68}	—	August 3, 2016	Cerro Paranal	Altmann, M., Prusti, T.	·	1.5 km	MPC · JPL
667564	2011 OQ_{69}	—	February 26, 2014	Haleakala	Pan-STARRS 1	·	440 m	MPC · JPL
667565	2011 OQ_{70}	—	July 26, 2011	Haleakala	Pan-STARRS 1	·	1.4 km	MPC · JPL
667566	2011 OR_{70}	—	July 25, 2011	Haleakala	Pan-STARRS 1	·	1.4 km	MPC · JPL
667567	2011 OT_{71}	—	July 29, 2011	Siding Spring	SSS	·	2.4 km	MPC · JPL
667568	2011 OB_{72}	—	September 20, 2007	Catalina	CSS	·	1.5 km	MPC · JPL
667569	2011 OY_{74}	—	November 19, 2008	Kitt Peak	Spacewatch	·	910 m	MPC · JPL
667570	2011 PJ_{2}	—	July 27, 2011	Haleakala	Pan-STARRS 1	V	380 m	MPC · JPL
667571	2011 PD_{3}	—	August 1, 2011	Haleakala	Pan-STARRS 1	BRA	1.2 km	MPC · JPL
667572	2011 PT_{3}	—	August 1, 2011	Haleakala	Pan-STARRS 1	·	680 m	MPC · JPL
667573	2011 PW_{3}	—	August 1, 2011	Haleakala	Pan-STARRS 1	·	1.9 km	MPC · JPL
667574	2011 PM_{9}	—	August 10, 2011	Haleakala	Pan-STARRS 1	EUN	1.0 km	MPC · JPL
667575	2011 PU_{10}	—	January 1, 2009	Mount Lemmon	Mount Lemmon Survey	·	1.9 km	MPC · JPL
667576	2011 PW_{12}	—	July 1, 2011	Mount Lemmon	Mount Lemmon Survey	·	1.5 km	MPC · JPL
667577	2011 PH_{14}	—	July 26, 2011	Haleakala	Pan-STARRS 1	PHO	720 m	MPC · JPL
667578	2011 PM_{14}	—	August 10, 2011	Haleakala	Pan-STARRS 1	·	1.6 km	MPC · JPL
667579	2011 PO_{16}	—	August 24, 2011	Haleakala	Pan-STARRS 1	GEF	1.1 km	MPC · JPL
667580	2011 PR_{16}	—	August 3, 2011	Haleakala	Pan-STARRS 1	TIR	2.5 km	MPC · JPL
667581	2011 PU_{16}	—	November 12, 2012	Kitt Peak	Spacewatch	·	2.5 km	MPC · JPL
667582	2011 PH_{18}	—	August 2, 2011	Haleakala	Pan-STARRS 1	·	910 m	MPC · JPL
667583	2011 PM_{19}	—	February 26, 2014	Mount Lemmon	Mount Lemmon Survey	·	1.8 km	MPC · JPL
667584	2011 QC_{2}	—	August 2, 2011	Haleakala	Pan-STARRS 1	H	460 m	MPC · JPL
667585	2011 QQ_{8}	—	August 19, 2011	Haleakala	Pan-STARRS 1	·	770 m	MPC · JPL
667586	2011 QJ_{11}	—	August 21, 2011	Haleakala	Pan-STARRS 1	H	410 m	MPC · JPL
667587	2011 QS_{12}	—	September 15, 2007	Kitt Peak	Spacewatch	·	1.7 km	MPC · JPL
667588	2011 QX_{12}	—	June 28, 2001	Kitt Peak	Spacewatch	·	690 m	MPC · JPL
667589	2011 QG_{19}	—	August 23, 2011	Haleakala	Pan-STARRS 1	·	2.8 km	MPC · JPL
667590	2011 QF_{20}	—	August 2, 2000	Kitt Peak	Spacewatch	EOS	2.3 km	MPC · JPL
667591	2011 QL_{24}	—	August 20, 2011	Haleakala	Pan-STARRS 1	·	2.0 km	MPC · JPL
667592	2011 QF_{26}	—	September 28, 2003	Apache Point	SDSS Collaboration	·	1.7 km	MPC · JPL
667593	2011 QZ_{28}	—	August 23, 2011	Haleakala	Pan-STARRS 1	·	1.4 km	MPC · JPL
667594	2011 QR_{29}	—	August 24, 2011	Charleston	R. Holmes	·	810 m	MPC · JPL
667595	2011 QR_{30}	—	August 4, 2011	Siding Spring	SSS	·	900 m	MPC · JPL
667596	2011 QT_{31}	—	April 14, 2007	Mount Lemmon	Mount Lemmon Survey	·	660 m	MPC · JPL
667597	2011 QO_{33}	—	August 23, 2011	Haleakala	Pan-STARRS 1	·	2.0 km	MPC · JPL
667598	2011 QG_{34}	—	August 24, 2011	Haleakala	Pan-STARRS 1	·	490 m	MPC · JPL
667599	2011 QT_{34}	—	August 25, 2011	Mayhill-ISON	L. Elenin	·	640 m	MPC · JPL
667600	2011 QR_{40}	—	August 23, 2011	La Sagra	OAM	T_{j} (2.79)	2.8 km	MPC · JPL

== 667601–667700 ==
back to top

Designation			Discovery			Properties		Ref
Permanent	Provisional	Named after	Date	Site	Discoverer(s)	Category	Diam.	Ref
667601	2011 QX_{43}	—	August 2, 2011	Haleakala	Pan-STARRS 1	·	1.6 km	MPC · JPL
667602	2011 QV_{44}	—	August 26, 2011	Haleakala	Pan-STARRS 1	GEF	1.0 km	MPC · JPL
667603	2011 QK_{45}	—	August 22, 2011	La Sagra	OAM	·	2.0 km	MPC · JPL
667604	2011 QH_{48}	—	August 20, 2011	Haleakala	Pan-STARRS 1	·	1.6 km	MPC · JPL
667605	2011 QY_{50}	—	October 6, 2000	Kitt Peak	Spacewatch	·	920 m	MPC · JPL
667606	2011 QK_{53}	—	October 9, 2004	Kitt Peak	Spacewatch	NYS	780 m	MPC · JPL
667607	2011 QF_{55}	—	August 30, 2011	Haleakala	Pan-STARRS 1	·	600 m	MPC · JPL
667608	2011 QK_{61}	—	August 31, 2011	Haleakala	Pan-STARRS 1	·	2.3 km	MPC · JPL
667609	2011 QZ_{61}	—	August 31, 2011	Haleakala	Pan-STARRS 1	·	820 m	MPC · JPL
667610	2011 QH_{62}	—	August 31, 2011	Haleakala	Pan-STARRS 1	PHO	880 m	MPC · JPL
667611	2011 QS_{63}	—	August 31, 2011	La Sagra	OAM	·	2.7 km	MPC · JPL
667612	2011 QM_{69}	—	November 1, 2008	Mount Lemmon	Mount Lemmon Survey	·	2.8 km	MPC · JPL
667613	2011 QU_{69}	—	June 5, 2011	Mount Lemmon	Mount Lemmon Survey	·	950 m	MPC · JPL
667614	2011 QX_{74}	—	July 28, 2011	Haleakala	Pan-STARRS 1	·	1.9 km	MPC · JPL
667615	2011 QY_{77}	—	September 14, 2007	Mount Lemmon	Mount Lemmon Survey	HOF	2.7 km	MPC · JPL
667616	2011 QT_{80}	—	August 24, 2011	Haleakala	Pan-STARRS 1	·	2.7 km	MPC · JPL
667617	2011 QH_{82}	—	August 24, 2011	Haleakala	Pan-STARRS 1	·	1.8 km	MPC · JPL
667618	2011 QP_{84}	—	August 24, 2011	Haleakala	Pan-STARRS 1	·	1.5 km	MPC · JPL
667619	2011 QA_{87}	—	August 26, 2011	Haleakala	Pan-STARRS 1	·	2.2 km	MPC · JPL
667620	2011 QT_{88}	—	February 4, 2009	Kitt Peak	Spacewatch	MAS	630 m	MPC · JPL
667621	2011 QH_{92}	—	December 4, 2008	Kitt Peak	Spacewatch	·	920 m	MPC · JPL
667622	2011 QF_{93}	—	August 30, 2011	Haleakala	Pan-STARRS 1	·	690 m	MPC · JPL
667623	2011 QS_{93}	—	August 31, 2011	La Sagra	OAM	·	2.1 km	MPC · JPL
667624	2011 QE_{94}	—	November 20, 2008	Mount Lemmon	Mount Lemmon Survey	·	940 m	MPC · JPL
667625	2011 QK_{94}	—	August 31, 2011	Haleakala	Pan-STARRS 1	TIR	2.1 km	MPC · JPL
667626	2011 QL_{99}	—	September 20, 2011	Haleakala	Pan-STARRS 1	L5	6.4 km	MPC · JPL
667627	2011 QR_{100}	—	September 15, 2004	Kitt Peak	Spacewatch	·	760 m	MPC · JPL
667628	2011 QE_{101}	—	November 7, 2012	Kitt Peak	Spacewatch	·	1.3 km	MPC · JPL
667629	2011 QN_{101}	—	October 8, 2012	Mount Lemmon	Mount Lemmon Survey	3:2	4.7 km	MPC · JPL
667630	2011 QG_{102}	—	April 6, 2014	Kitt Peak	Spacewatch	·	810 m	MPC · JPL
667631	2011 QL_{102}	—	July 5, 2016	Mount Lemmon	Mount Lemmon Survey	·	2.2 km	MPC · JPL
667632	2011 QH_{103}	—	January 28, 2014	Mount Lemmon	Mount Lemmon Survey	TIN	1.1 km	MPC · JPL
667633	2011 QU_{105}	—	August 25, 2011	Siding Spring	SSS	T_{j} (2.91)	2.8 km	MPC · JPL
667634	2011 QV_{105}	—	January 26, 2017	Haleakala	Pan-STARRS 1	·	940 m	MPC · JPL
667635	2011 QU_{106}	—	August 27, 2011	Haleakala	Pan-STARRS 1	·	690 m	MPC · JPL
667636	2011 QF_{109}	—	August 20, 2011	Haleakala	Pan-STARRS 1	·	760 m	MPC · JPL
667637	2011 QJ_{109}	—	August 27, 2011	Haleakala	Pan-STARRS 1	·	920 m	MPC · JPL
667638	2011 QP_{111}	—	August 31, 2011	Haleakala	Pan-STARRS 1	·	860 m	MPC · JPL
667639	2011 QT_{111}	—	August 24, 2011	Siding Spring	SSS	·	940 m	MPC · JPL
667640	2011 QG_{112}	—	August 31, 2011	Siding Spring	SSS	·	1.3 km	MPC · JPL
667641	2011 QT_{113}	—	August 30, 2011	Haleakala	Pan-STARRS 1	·	820 m	MPC · JPL
667642	2011 QO_{114}	—	August 24, 2011	Haleakala	Pan-STARRS 1	L5	8.8 km	MPC · JPL
667643	2011 QY_{114}	—	August 28, 2011	Haleakala	Pan-STARRS 1	·	590 m	MPC · JPL
667644	2011 QN_{115}	—	August 23, 2011	Haleakala	Pan-STARRS 1	·	1.7 km	MPC · JPL
667645	2011 QU_{115}	—	August 24, 2011	Haleakala	Pan-STARRS 1	·	1.5 km	MPC · JPL
667646	2011 QJ_{117}	—	August 26, 2011	Piszkéstető	K. Sárneczky	·	750 m	MPC · JPL
667647	2011 RB_{1}	—	August 16, 2002	Palomar	NEAT	·	1.8 km	MPC · JPL
667648	2011 RU_{5}	—	August 24, 2011	Haleakala	Pan-STARRS 1	·	770 m	MPC · JPL
667649	2011 RF_{9}	—	September 1, 2011	Haleakala	Pan-STARRS 1	NYS	890 m	MPC · JPL
667650	2011 RV_{9}	—	August 20, 2011	Haleakala	Pan-STARRS 1	·	1.0 km	MPC · JPL
667651	2011 RO_{12}	—	September 4, 2011	Haleakala	Pan-STARRS 1	·	800 m	MPC · JPL
667652	2011 RD_{13}	—	March 12, 2004	Palomar	NEAT	·	2.0 km	MPC · JPL
667653	2011 RH_{14}	—	September 4, 2011	Haleakala	Pan-STARRS 1	·	2.1 km	MPC · JPL
667654	2011 RM_{16}	—	August 27, 2011	Haleakala	Pan-STARRS 1	·	760 m	MPC · JPL
667655	2011 RB_{17}	—	September 2, 2011	Mayhill-ISON	L. Elenin	·	1.1 km	MPC · JPL
667656	2011 RN_{21}	—	September 4, 2011	Haleakala	Pan-STARRS 1	V	540 m	MPC · JPL
667657	2011 RT_{21}	—	August 30, 2016	Mount Lemmon	Mount Lemmon Survey	·	2.4 km	MPC · JPL
667658	2011 RJ_{22}	—	April 23, 2014	Cerro Tololo	DECam	·	2.5 km	MPC · JPL
667659	2011 RN_{22}	—	September 8, 2011	Haleakala	Pan-STARRS 1	TIR	2.2 km	MPC · JPL
667660	2011 RV_{22}	—	September 2, 2011	Haleakala	Pan-STARRS 1	·	1.9 km	MPC · JPL
667661	2011 RY_{24}	—	September 4, 2011	Haleakala	Pan-STARRS 1	·	850 m	MPC · JPL
667662	2011 RU_{27}	—	September 8, 2011	Kitt Peak	Spacewatch	·	1.5 km	MPC · JPL
667663	2011 SY	—	September 5, 2011	Haleakala	Pan-STARRS 1	·	1.7 km	MPC · JPL
667664	2011 SO_{2}	—	October 16, 2007	Mount Lemmon	Mount Lemmon Survey	AGN	1.1 km	MPC · JPL
667665	2011 SS_{3}	—	September 18, 2011	Catalina	CSS	·	2.2 km	MPC · JPL
667666	2011 SX_{4}	—	September 2, 2011	Haleakala	Pan-STARRS 1	·	2.5 km	MPC · JPL
667667	2011 SD_{6}	—	August 30, 2011	Haleakala	Pan-STARRS 1	·	780 m	MPC · JPL
667668	2011 SE_{6}	—	August 22, 2004	Kitt Peak	Spacewatch	·	740 m	MPC · JPL
667669	2011 SX_{7}	—	January 13, 2002	Kitt Peak	Spacewatch	·	810 m	MPC · JPL
667670	2011 SP_{8}	—	September 16, 2006	Anderson Mesa	LONEOS	·	2.0 km	MPC · JPL
667671	2011 SV_{8}	—	August 31, 2011	La Sagra	OAM	·	990 m	MPC · JPL
667672	2011 SW_{8}	—	September 18, 2011	Mount Lemmon	Mount Lemmon Survey	·	1.1 km	MPC · JPL
667673	2011 SP_{9}	—	August 31, 2011	Haleakala	Pan-STARRS 1	·	860 m	MPC · JPL
667674	2011 SZ_{9}	—	September 19, 2011	Catalina	CSS	V	570 m	MPC · JPL
667675	2011 SS_{10}	—	September 2, 2011	Haleakala	Pan-STARRS 1	·	970 m	MPC · JPL
667676	2011 SF_{11}	—	August 4, 2005	Palomar	NEAT	·	3.2 km	MPC · JPL
667677	2011 SG_{12}	—	September 4, 2011	Haleakala	Pan-STARRS 1	·	1.5 km	MPC · JPL
667678	2011 SP_{15}	—	September 4, 2011	Haleakala	Pan-STARRS 1	·	640 m	MPC · JPL
667679	2011 SC_{18}	—	January 20, 2009	Kitt Peak	Spacewatch	·	1.1 km	MPC · JPL
667680	2011 SO_{18}	—	September 19, 2011	Mount Lemmon	Mount Lemmon Survey	EOS	1.4 km	MPC · JPL
667681	2011 SN_{20}	—	September 20, 2011	Haleakala	Pan-STARRS 1	TIR	2.4 km	MPC · JPL
667682	2011 SE_{21}	—	January 28, 2007	Kitt Peak	Spacewatch	·	2.0 km	MPC · JPL
667683	2011 SF_{24}	—	September 20, 2011	Ka-Dar	Gerke, V.	·	1.0 km	MPC · JPL
667684	2011 SK_{27}	—	August 29, 2011	Siding Spring	SSS	·	1.4 km	MPC · JPL
667685	2011 SH_{29}	—	September 19, 2006	Kitt Peak	Spacewatch	EOS	1.9 km	MPC · JPL
667686	2011 SQ_{29}	—	August 20, 2011	Haleakala	Pan-STARRS 1	·	900 m	MPC · JPL
667687	2011 SC_{37}	—	September 20, 2011	Kitt Peak	Spacewatch	·	2.4 km	MPC · JPL
667688	2011 SS_{37}	—	September 20, 2011	Kitt Peak	Spacewatch	(12739)	1.9 km	MPC · JPL
667689	2011 SU_{37}	—	September 27, 2006	Mount Lemmon	Mount Lemmon Survey	·	1.7 km	MPC · JPL
667690	2011 SW_{37}	—	September 20, 2011	Kitt Peak	Spacewatch	·	2.7 km	MPC · JPL
667691	2011 SS_{39}	—	November 19, 2006	Kitt Peak	Spacewatch	·	1.7 km	MPC · JPL
667692	2011 SW_{42}	—	September 18, 2011	Mount Lemmon	Mount Lemmon Survey	·	1.0 km	MPC · JPL
667693	2011 SH_{47}	—	September 20, 2011	Mount Lemmon	Mount Lemmon Survey	·	1.0 km	MPC · JPL
667694	2011 SS_{49}	—	November 7, 2007	Kitt Peak	Spacewatch	AEO	1.0 km	MPC · JPL
667695	2011 SE_{55}	—	September 23, 2011	Haleakala	Pan-STARRS 1	·	910 m	MPC · JPL
667696	2011 SA_{56}	—	February 9, 2008	Mount Lemmon	Mount Lemmon Survey	TEL	1.0 km	MPC · JPL
667697	2011 SR_{56}	—	September 23, 2011	Haleakala	Pan-STARRS 1	·	1.8 km	MPC · JPL
667698	2011 SN_{57}	—	September 23, 2011	Mount Lemmon	Mount Lemmon Survey	·	2.3 km	MPC · JPL
667699	2011 SW_{57}	—	October 9, 2007	Mount Lemmon	Mount Lemmon Survey	MAR	950 m	MPC · JPL
667700	2011 SX_{57}	—	March 16, 2010	Mount Lemmon	Mount Lemmon Survey	·	660 m	MPC · JPL

== 667701–667800 ==
back to top

Designation			Discovery			Properties		Ref
Permanent	Provisional	Named after	Date	Site	Discoverer(s)	Category	Diam.	Ref
667701	2011 SB_{60}	—	January 15, 2009	Kitt Peak	Spacewatch	NYS	740 m	MPC · JPL
667702	2011 SU_{60}	—	September 19, 2011	Haleakala	Pan-STARRS 1	·	1.8 km	MPC · JPL
667703	2011 SZ_{60}	—	October 7, 2002	Haleakala	NEAT	·	1.9 km	MPC · JPL
667704	2011 SJ_{61}	—	February 19, 2009	Catalina	CSS	·	2.1 km	MPC · JPL
667705	2011 SO_{62}	—	September 21, 2011	Haleakala	Pan-STARRS 1	·	1.9 km	MPC · JPL
667706	2011 SQ_{62}	—	September 21, 2011	Haleakala	Pan-STARRS 1	EUP	3.0 km	MPC · JPL
667707	2011 SW_{62}	—	June 8, 2011	Haleakala	Pan-STARRS 1	BRA	1.5 km	MPC · JPL
667708	2011 SS_{63}	—	October 11, 2002	Socorro	LINEAR	·	1.5 km	MPC · JPL
667709	2011 SS_{65}	—	September 19, 2011	Haleakala	Pan-STARRS 1	·	620 m	MPC · JPL
667710	2011 SW_{65}	—	August 31, 2011	Piszkéstető	K. Sárneczky	·	1.8 km	MPC · JPL
667711	2011 SG_{66}	—	October 3, 2002	Palomar	NEAT	·	2.2 km	MPC · JPL
667712	2011 SK_{66}	—	September 21, 2011	Mayhill-ISON	L. Elenin	·	1.3 km	MPC · JPL
667713 Richardholman	2011 SA_{71}	Richardholman	September 23, 2011	Mayhill	Falla, N.	·	1.9 km	MPC · JPL
667714	2011 SN_{74}	—	September 19, 2011	Mount Lemmon	Mount Lemmon Survey	·	2.0 km	MPC · JPL
667715	2011 SL_{75}	—	September 20, 2011	Mount Lemmon	Mount Lemmon Survey	L5	5.9 km	MPC · JPL
667716	2011 SA_{78}	—	September 4, 2011	Haleakala	Pan-STARRS 1	·	1.6 km	MPC · JPL
667717	2011 SE_{82}	—	October 6, 2002	Palomar	NEAT	·	1.4 km	MPC · JPL
667718	2011 SX_{82}	—	March 19, 2009	Mount Lemmon	Mount Lemmon Survey	·	2.1 km	MPC · JPL
667719	2011 SA_{87}	—	September 22, 2011	Kitt Peak	Spacewatch	HOF	2.5 km	MPC · JPL
667720	2011 SL_{88}	—	October 29, 2002	Kitt Peak	Spacewatch	·	1.8 km	MPC · JPL
667721	2011 SX_{88}	—	September 22, 2011	Kitt Peak	Spacewatch	·	1.1 km	MPC · JPL
667722	2011 SC_{92}	—	September 22, 2011	Kitt Peak	Spacewatch	T_{j} (2.97) · 3:2	3.9 km	MPC · JPL
667723	2011 SE_{95}	—	September 24, 2011	Mount Lemmon	Mount Lemmon Survey	H	420 m	MPC · JPL
667724	2011 SG_{99}	—	April 4, 2005	Mount Lemmon	Mount Lemmon Survey	(5)	1.3 km	MPC · JPL
667725	2011 SM_{101}	—	September 24, 2011	Mount Lemmon	Mount Lemmon Survey	·	670 m	MPC · JPL
667726	2011 SH_{102}	—	September 19, 2011	Haleakala	Pan-STARRS 1	·	670 m	MPC · JPL
667727	2011 SK_{103}	—	June 27, 2011	Mount Lemmon	Mount Lemmon Survey	·	1.2 km	MPC · JPL
667728	2011 SN_{103}	—	September 7, 2011	Kitt Peak	Spacewatch	EUN	1.5 km	MPC · JPL
667729	2011 SG_{104}	—	September 23, 2011	Kitt Peak	Spacewatch	EOS	1.4 km	MPC · JPL
667730	2011 SS_{106}	—	September 24, 2011	Bergisch Gladbach	W. Bickel	·	910 m	MPC · JPL
667731	2011 SY_{106}	—	September 20, 2011	Kitt Peak	Spacewatch	EUN	1.5 km	MPC · JPL
667732	2011 SA_{108}	—	June 4, 2011	Cerro Tololo	EURONEAR	·	1.4 km	MPC · JPL
667733	2011 SZ_{109}	—	October 5, 2004	Anderson Mesa	LONEOS	·	1.1 km	MPC · JPL
667734	2011 SX_{110}	—	March 4, 2005	Mount Lemmon	Mount Lemmon Survey	·	2.0 km	MPC · JPL
667735	2011 SD_{112}	—	August 30, 2011	Piszkéstető	K. Sárneczky	·	1.1 km	MPC · JPL
667736	2011 SR_{113}	—	September 30, 2006	Mount Lemmon	Mount Lemmon Survey	·	2.2 km	MPC · JPL
667737	2011 SF_{114}	—	September 20, 2011	Mount Lemmon	Mount Lemmon Survey	MAS	590 m	MPC · JPL
667738	2011 SS_{117}	—	October 9, 2004	Kitt Peak	Spacewatch	·	870 m	MPC · JPL
667739	2011 SC_{118}	—	October 31, 2002	Palomar	NEAT	·	2.4 km	MPC · JPL
667740	2011 SN_{118}	—	September 24, 2011	Mount Lemmon	Mount Lemmon Survey	MAS	660 m	MPC · JPL
667741	2011 SP_{119}	—	September 26, 2011	Kitt Peak	Spacewatch	·	780 m	MPC · JPL
667742	2011 SA_{120}	—	September 20, 2011	La Sagra	OAM	·	2.6 km	MPC · JPL
667743	2011 SH_{120}	—	September 27, 2011	Mayhill-ISON	L. Elenin	KOR	1.4 km	MPC · JPL
667744	2011 SS_{120}	—	November 12, 2001	Apache Point	SDSS Collaboration	EOS	1.9 km	MPC · JPL
667745	2011 SF_{124}	—	September 23, 2011	Haleakala	Pan-STARRS 1	·	1.9 km	MPC · JPL
667746	2011 SF_{126}	—	August 15, 2002	Kitt Peak	Spacewatch	·	1.6 km	MPC · JPL
667747	2011 SK_{126}	—	September 20, 2011	Kitt Peak	Spacewatch	EOS	1.4 km	MPC · JPL
667748	2011 SN_{126}	—	September 20, 2011	Kitt Peak	Spacewatch	NYS	950 m	MPC · JPL
667749	2011 SF_{127}	—	August 14, 2006	Siding Spring	SSS	GEF	1.2 km	MPC · JPL
667750	2011 SZ_{128}	—	December 31, 2008	Kitt Peak	Spacewatch	·	530 m	MPC · JPL
667751	2011 SU_{131}	—	May 20, 2010	Mount Lemmon	Mount Lemmon Survey	AEO	1.2 km	MPC · JPL
667752	2011 ST_{133}	—	October 23, 2004	Kitt Peak	Spacewatch	·	820 m	MPC · JPL
667753	2011 SA_{137}	—	September 4, 2011	Haleakala	Pan-STARRS 1	·	2.1 km	MPC · JPL
667754	2011 SR_{138}	—	September 4, 2011	Haleakala	Pan-STARRS 1	·	2.0 km	MPC · JPL
667755	2011 SV_{138}	—	March 8, 2003	Kitt Peak	Spacewatch	·	650 m	MPC · JPL
667756	2011 SL_{142}	—	January 19, 2004	Kitt Peak	Spacewatch	·	1.9 km	MPC · JPL
667757	2011 ST_{142}	—	September 23, 2011	Haleakala	Pan-STARRS 1	·	2.8 km	MPC · JPL
667758	2011 SY_{144}	—	September 26, 2011	Catalina	CSS	T_{j} (2.99) · EUP	2.6 km	MPC · JPL
667759	2011 SM_{147}	—	September 26, 2011	Mount Lemmon	Mount Lemmon Survey	·	2.2 km	MPC · JPL
667760	2011 SN_{148}	—	September 26, 2011	Mount Lemmon	Mount Lemmon Survey	V	500 m	MPC · JPL
667761	2011 SD_{157}	—	October 21, 2007	Mount Lemmon	Mount Lemmon Survey	·	1.6 km	MPC · JPL
667762	2011 SL_{157}	—	October 20, 2006	Kitt Peak	Spacewatch	·	1.6 km	MPC · JPL
667763	2011 SX_{160}	—	September 23, 2011	Kitt Peak	Spacewatch	·	1.6 km	MPC · JPL
667764	2011 SP_{161}	—	September 23, 2011	Kitt Peak	Spacewatch	·	2.2 km	MPC · JPL
667765	2011 SA_{162}	—	November 22, 2006	Catalina	CSS	·	2.2 km	MPC · JPL
667766	2011 SB_{162}	—	October 9, 2004	Kitt Peak	Spacewatch	·	840 m	MPC · JPL
667767	2011 SP_{162}	—	September 23, 2011	Kitt Peak	Spacewatch	EOS	1.7 km	MPC · JPL
667768	2011 SK_{163}	—	October 4, 2006	Mount Lemmon	Mount Lemmon Survey	EOS	1.5 km	MPC · JPL
667769	2011 SO_{164}	—	September 20, 2011	Kitt Peak	Spacewatch	·	1.9 km	MPC · JPL
667770	2011 SY_{168}	—	September 21, 2011	Kitt Peak	Spacewatch	·	770 m	MPC · JPL
667771	2011 SM_{169}	—	September 21, 2011	Kitt Peak	Spacewatch	NYS	840 m	MPC · JPL
667772 Wuhsinheng	2011 SO_{169}	Wuhsinheng	November 12, 2006	Mount Lulin	LUSS	·	2.2 km	MPC · JPL
667773	2011 SV_{169}	—	September 28, 2011	Mount Lemmon	Mount Lemmon Survey	·	2.3 km	MPC · JPL
667774	2011 SX_{169}	—	September 28, 2011	Mount Lemmon	Mount Lemmon Survey	·	940 m	MPC · JPL
667775	2011 SY_{169}	—	September 28, 2011	Mount Lemmon	Mount Lemmon Survey	·	860 m	MPC · JPL
667776	2011 SF_{174}	—	September 6, 2011	Bisei	BATTeRS	·	930 m	MPC · JPL
667777	2011 SR_{175}	—	September 8, 2011	Kitt Peak	Spacewatch	MAS	620 m	MPC · JPL
667778	2011 SJ_{176}	—	September 29, 2011	Mount Lemmon	Mount Lemmon Survey	·	2.2 km	MPC · JPL
667779	2011 SE_{178}	—	September 24, 2011	Mount Lemmon	Mount Lemmon Survey	·	2.5 km	MPC · JPL
667780	2011 SY_{179}	—	September 26, 2011	Kitt Peak	Spacewatch	NYS	770 m	MPC · JPL
667781	2011 SX_{183}	—	July 15, 2004	Siding Spring	SSS	·	550 m	MPC · JPL
667782	2011 SK_{184}	—	September 26, 2011	Kitt Peak	Spacewatch	·	1.7 km	MPC · JPL
667783	2011 SX_{185}	—	September 28, 2011	Mount Lemmon	Mount Lemmon Survey	·	2.1 km	MPC · JPL
667784	2011 SP_{186}	—	September 29, 2011	Kitt Peak	Spacewatch	HOF	2.5 km	MPC · JPL
667785	2011 SW_{186}	—	September 29, 2011	Mount Lemmon	Mount Lemmon Survey	EUP	2.8 km	MPC · JPL
667786	2011 SZ_{186}	—	January 20, 2009	Kitt Peak	Spacewatch	NYS	960 m	MPC · JPL
667787	2011 SN_{188}	—	September 22, 2011	Kitt Peak	Spacewatch	·	1.7 km	MPC · JPL
667788	2011 SP_{191}	—	September 2, 2011	Haleakala	Pan-STARRS 1	·	2.2 km	MPC · JPL
667789	2011 SR_{195}	—	August 20, 2011	Haleakala	Pan-STARRS 1	V	720 m	MPC · JPL
667790	2011 SH_{197}	—	February 27, 2009	Mount Lemmon	Mount Lemmon Survey	KOR	1.2 km	MPC · JPL
667791	2011 SQ_{202}	—	September 19, 2011	Mount Lemmon	Mount Lemmon Survey	·	990 m	MPC · JPL
667792	2011 SA_{203}	—	September 19, 2011	Catalina	CSS	·	2.5 km	MPC · JPL
667793	2011 ST_{203}	—	September 20, 2011	Kitt Peak	Spacewatch	PHO	540 m	MPC · JPL
667794	2011 SP_{204}	—	September 20, 2011	Kitt Peak	Spacewatch	·	2.6 km	MPC · JPL
667795	2011 SJ_{206}	—	August 30, 2011	Haleakala	Pan-STARRS 1	·	470 m	MPC · JPL
667796	2011 SN_{206}	—	August 31, 2011	Haleakala	Pan-STARRS 1	·	1.6 km	MPC · JPL
667797	2011 SM_{209}	—	November 4, 2002	Kitt Peak	Spacewatch	·	1.9 km	MPC · JPL
667798	2011 SJ_{210}	—	August 4, 2011	Haleakala	Pan-STARRS 1	·	550 m	MPC · JPL
667799	2011 SE_{212}	—	August 23, 2011	Haleakala	Pan-STARRS 1	·	1.2 km	MPC · JPL
667800	2011 SF_{213}	—	December 31, 2008	Mount Lemmon	Mount Lemmon Survey	·	1.3 km	MPC · JPL

== 667801–667900 ==
back to top

Designation			Discovery			Properties		Ref
Permanent	Provisional	Named after	Date	Site	Discoverer(s)	Category	Diam.	Ref
667801	2011 SK_{213}	—	October 21, 2006	Mount Lemmon	Mount Lemmon Survey	·	1.9 km	MPC · JPL
667802	2011 SV_{213}	—	August 28, 2011	Haleakala	Pan-STARRS 1	·	2.4 km	MPC · JPL
667803	2011 SB_{219}	—	September 25, 2011	Wildberg	R. Apitzsch	NYS	670 m	MPC · JPL
667804	2011 SX_{220}	—	October 8, 2004	Kitt Peak	Spacewatch	V	890 m	MPC · JPL
667805	2011 SG_{222}	—	February 9, 2008	Kitt Peak	Spacewatch	EUP	3.0 km	MPC · JPL
667806	2011 SF_{224}	—	September 21, 2011	Les Engarouines	L. Bernasconi	·	1.9 km	MPC · JPL
667807	2011 ST_{225}	—	September 29, 2011	Mount Lemmon	Mount Lemmon Survey	·	2.1 km	MPC · JPL
667808	2011 SX_{225}	—	September 29, 2011	Mount Lemmon	Mount Lemmon Survey	V	490 m	MPC · JPL
667809	2011 SA_{226}	—	September 29, 2011	Mount Lemmon	Mount Lemmon Survey	·	1.8 km	MPC · JPL
667810	2011 SB_{226}	—	September 29, 2011	Mount Lemmon	Mount Lemmon Survey	·	1.9 km	MPC · JPL
667811	2011 SM_{228}	—	May 7, 2005	Kitt Peak	Spacewatch	(18466)	2.2 km	MPC · JPL
667812	2011 SV_{229}	—	July 3, 2011	Mount Lemmon	Mount Lemmon Survey	·	970 m	MPC · JPL
667813	2011 SK_{230}	—	September 26, 2011	Haleakala	Pan-STARRS 1	·	1.7 km	MPC · JPL
667814	2011 SJ_{232}	—	August 30, 2002	Anderson Mesa	LONEOS	JUN	1.4 km	MPC · JPL
667815	2011 SS_{236}	—	October 8, 2004	Kitt Peak	Spacewatch	·	1.1 km	MPC · JPL
667816	2011 SO_{239}	—	September 26, 2011	Mount Lemmon	Mount Lemmon Survey	MAS	530 m	MPC · JPL
667817	2011 SH_{245}	—	September 29, 2011	Mount Lemmon	Mount Lemmon Survey	·	1.2 km	MPC · JPL
667818	2011 SS_{245}	—	October 1, 2000	Kitt Peak	Spacewatch	·	880 m	MPC · JPL
667819	2011 SM_{246}	—	September 20, 2011	Kitt Peak	Spacewatch	·	530 m	MPC · JPL
667820	2011 SX_{249}	—	September 29, 2011	Mount Lemmon	Mount Lemmon Survey	·	2.1 km	MPC · JPL
667821	2011 SE_{251}	—	September 25, 2011	Haleakala	Pan-STARRS 1	·	2.3 km	MPC · JPL
667822	2011 SD_{252}	—	September 26, 2011	Haleakala	Pan-STARRS 1	·	1.7 km	MPC · JPL
667823	2011 SX_{253}	—	September 28, 2011	Kitt Peak	Spacewatch	·	2.1 km	MPC · JPL
667824	2011 SC_{254}	—	February 26, 2009	Calar Alto	F. Hormuth	NEM	2.0 km	MPC · JPL
667825	2011 SC_{257}	—	September 22, 2011	Kitt Peak	Spacewatch	·	2.6 km	MPC · JPL
667826	2011 SH_{257}	—	September 23, 2011	Kitt Peak	Spacewatch	·	570 m	MPC · JPL
667827	2011 SR_{259}	—	September 28, 2011	Kitt Peak	Spacewatch	NYS	910 m	MPC · JPL
667828	2011 SM_{260}	—	September 30, 2011	Kitt Peak	Spacewatch	THM	1.9 km	MPC · JPL
667829	2011 SU_{260}	—	March 1, 2009	Cerro Burek	Burek, Cerro	GEF	1.3 km	MPC · JPL
667830	2011 SF_{264}	—	August 27, 2011	Haleakala	Pan-STARRS 1	·	1.8 km	MPC · JPL
667831	2011 SF_{265}	—	December 20, 2007	Kitt Peak	Spacewatch	KOR	1.7 km	MPC · JPL
667832	2011 SO_{267}	—	September 21, 2011	Kitt Peak	Spacewatch	KOR	1.3 km	MPC · JPL
667833	2011 SB_{268}	—	October 19, 2006	Kitt Peak	Deep Ecliptic Survey	·	1.7 km	MPC · JPL
667834	2011 SH_{268}	—	September 23, 2011	Kitt Peak	Spacewatch	·	930 m	MPC · JPL
667835	2011 SV_{268}	—	September 23, 2011	Haleakala	Pan-STARRS 1	3:2	5.3 km	MPC · JPL
667836	2011 SH_{272}	—	October 5, 2011	Haleakala	Pan-STARRS 1	V	590 m	MPC · JPL
667837	2011 SJ_{273}	—	August 28, 2006	Catalina	CSS	·	2.4 km	MPC · JPL
667838	2011 SV_{275}	—	August 29, 2005	Socorro	LINEAR	THB	2.6 km	MPC · JPL
667839	2011 SE_{276}	—	September 24, 2011	Haleakala	Pan-STARRS 1	·	1.7 km	MPC · JPL
667840	2011 SF_{276}	—	September 14, 2007	Mount Lemmon	Mount Lemmon Survey	·	1.5 km	MPC · JPL
667841	2011 SH_{279}	—	September 23, 2011	Kitt Peak	Spacewatch	·	2.4 km	MPC · JPL
667842	2011 SB_{280}	—	September 24, 2011	Haleakala	Pan-STARRS 1	·	2.1 km	MPC · JPL
667843	2011 SE_{282}	—	September 21, 2011	Mayhill-ISON	L. Elenin	·	2.0 km	MPC · JPL
667844	2011 SF_{282}	—	September 24, 2011	Mount Lemmon	Mount Lemmon Survey	TIR	2.2 km	MPC · JPL
667845	2011 SQ_{282}	—	January 16, 2013	ESA OGS	ESA OGS	·	2.5 km	MPC · JPL
667846	2011 SU_{282}	—	September 24, 2011	Haleakala	Pan-STARRS 1	EOS	1.8 km	MPC · JPL
667847	2011 SB_{283}	—	August 28, 2016	Mount Lemmon	Mount Lemmon Survey	·	1.6 km	MPC · JPL
667848	2011 SD_{283}	—	September 20, 2011	Haleakala	Pan-STARRS 1	·	3.4 km	MPC · JPL
667849	2011 SE_{283}	—	December 6, 2015	Haleakala	Pan-STARRS 1	V	600 m	MPC · JPL
667850	2011 SM_{283}	—	February 8, 2013	Haleakala	Pan-STARRS 1	·	1.6 km	MPC · JPL
667851	2011 SX_{283}	—	September 29, 2011	Mount Lemmon	Mount Lemmon Survey	·	980 m	MPC · JPL
667852	2011 ST_{284}	—	September 24, 2011	Catalina	CSS	PHO	790 m	MPC · JPL
667853	2011 SR_{285}	—	September 26, 2011	Haleakala	Pan-STARRS 1	PHO	800 m	MPC · JPL
667854	2011 SB_{286}	—	September 21, 2011	Catalina	CSS	·	1.6 km	MPC · JPL
667855	2011 SR_{286}	—	July 19, 2015	Haleakala	Pan-STARRS 1	·	1.2 km	MPC · JPL
667856	2011 SY_{287}	—	February 3, 2013	Haleakala	Pan-STARRS 1	·	910 m	MPC · JPL
667857	2011 SH_{288}	—	September 28, 2011	Mount Lemmon	Mount Lemmon Survey	·	2.1 km	MPC · JPL
667858	2011 SD_{289}	—	September 20, 2011	Catalina	CSS	·	1.1 km	MPC · JPL
667859	2011 SO_{289}	—	September 23, 2011	Kitt Peak	Spacewatch	·	1.7 km	MPC · JPL
667860	2011 SO_{290}	—	September 25, 2011	Haleakala	Pan-STARRS 1	ERI	1.4 km	MPC · JPL
667861	2011 SE_{292}	—	September 8, 2011	Kitt Peak	Spacewatch	·	830 m	MPC · JPL
667862	2011 SX_{296}	—	September 20, 2011	Haleakala	Pan-STARRS 1	·	1.3 km	MPC · JPL
667863	2011 SC_{297}	—	April 4, 2014	Mount Lemmon	Mount Lemmon Survey	·	1.5 km	MPC · JPL
667864	2011 SR_{299}	—	April 23, 2014	Cerro Tololo-DECam	DECam	·	1.7 km	MPC · JPL
667865	2011 SX_{299}	—	September 23, 2011	Haleakala	Pan-STARRS 1	·	950 m	MPC · JPL
667866	2011 SH_{300}	—	September 28, 2011	Kitt Peak	Spacewatch	V	510 m	MPC · JPL
667867	2011 SJ_{300}	—	September 26, 2011	Haleakala	Pan-STARRS 1	·	1.1 km	MPC · JPL
667868	2011 SS_{302}	—	September 23, 2011	Haleakala	Pan-STARRS 1	CLA	1.3 km	MPC · JPL
667869	2011 SC_{303}	—	July 9, 2015	Haleakala	Pan-STARRS 1	·	1.9 km	MPC · JPL
667870	2011 ST_{303}	—	September 29, 2011	Mount Lemmon	Mount Lemmon Survey	·	2.2 km	MPC · JPL
667871	2011 SK_{304}	—	March 15, 2013	Mount Lemmon	Mount Lemmon Survey	NYS	730 m	MPC · JPL
667872	2011 SO_{306}	—	September 24, 2011	Haleakala	Pan-STARRS 1	·	2.2 km	MPC · JPL
667873	2011 SS_{306}	—	September 24, 2011	Haleakala	Pan-STARRS 1	·	1.0 km	MPC · JPL
667874	2011 SX_{307}	—	September 27, 2011	Mount Lemmon	Mount Lemmon Survey	EOS	1.6 km	MPC · JPL
667875	2011 SG_{308}	—	September 26, 2011	Haleakala	Pan-STARRS 1	V	410 m	MPC · JPL
667876	2011 SJ_{309}	—	September 23, 2011	Kitt Peak	Spacewatch	EOS	1.5 km	MPC · JPL
667877	2011 SQ_{309}	—	September 28, 2011	Kitt Peak	Spacewatch	NYS	1.0 km	MPC · JPL
667878	2011 SX_{309}	—	September 28, 2011	Mount Lemmon	Mount Lemmon Survey	·	820 m	MPC · JPL
667879	2011 SP_{310}	—	September 26, 2011	Haleakala	Pan-STARRS 1	·	650 m	MPC · JPL
667880	2011 SQ_{310}	—	September 23, 2011	Mount Lemmon	Mount Lemmon Survey	·	2.0 km	MPC · JPL
667881	2011 SJ_{311}	—	September 27, 2011	Mount Lemmon	Mount Lemmon Survey	·	1 km	MPC · JPL
667882	2011 SQ_{311}	—	September 25, 2011	Haleakala	Pan-STARRS 1	EUP	2.1 km	MPC · JPL
667883	2011 SJ_{312}	—	September 24, 2011	Haleakala	Pan-STARRS 1	EOS	1.5 km	MPC · JPL
667884	2011 SQ_{312}	—	September 23, 2011	Mount Lemmon	Mount Lemmon Survey	·	1.2 km	MPC · JPL
667885	2011 SV_{317}	—	September 20, 2011	Mount Lemmon	Mount Lemmon Survey	·	1.8 km	MPC · JPL
667886	2011 SV_{318}	—	February 29, 2008	Kitt Peak	Spacewatch	·	2.3 km	MPC · JPL
667887	2011 SM_{320}	—	September 28, 2011	Kitt Peak	Spacewatch	·	1.6 km	MPC · JPL
667888	2011 SK_{324}	—	September 21, 2011	Kitt Peak	Spacewatch	·	2.2 km	MPC · JPL
667889	2011 SL_{324}	—	September 22, 2011	Kitt Peak	Spacewatch	LIX	2.3 km	MPC · JPL
667890	2011 SA_{326}	—	September 21, 2011	Mount Lemmon	Mount Lemmon Survey	·	1.4 km	MPC · JPL
667891	2011 ST_{327}	—	September 27, 2011	Mount Lemmon	Mount Lemmon Survey	·	2.1 km	MPC · JPL
667892	2011 SD_{332}	—	September 18, 2011	Mount Lemmon	Mount Lemmon Survey	KOR	1.2 km	MPC · JPL
667893	2011 SW_{332}	—	September 19, 2011	Haleakala	Pan-STARRS 1	EOS	1.6 km	MPC · JPL
667894	2011 SJ_{333}	—	September 28, 2011	Kitt Peak	Spacewatch	MAS	610 m	MPC · JPL
667895	2011 SS_{334}	—	September 30, 2011	Kitt Peak	Spacewatch	EOS	1.4 km	MPC · JPL
667896	2011 SF_{335}	—	September 20, 2011	Mount Lemmon	Mount Lemmon Survey	·	1.3 km	MPC · JPL
667897	2011 SQ_{336}	—	September 24, 2011	Mount Lemmon	Mount Lemmon Survey	·	1.6 km	MPC · JPL
667898	2011 SW_{336}	—	September 27, 2011	Mount Lemmon	Mount Lemmon Survey	·	2.3 km	MPC · JPL
667899	2011 SL_{338}	—	September 21, 2011	Mount Lemmon	Mount Lemmon Survey	·	1.5 km	MPC · JPL
667900	2011 SF_{339}	—	September 21, 2011	Mount Lemmon	Mount Lemmon Survey	KOR	1.2 km	MPC · JPL

== 667901–668000 ==
back to top

Designation			Discovery			Properties		Ref
Permanent	Provisional	Named after	Date	Site	Discoverer(s)	Category	Diam.	Ref
667901	2011 SV_{344}	—	January 18, 2008	Mount Lemmon	Mount Lemmon Survey	·	1.5 km	MPC · JPL
667902	2011 SG_{347}	—	September 28, 2011	Mount Lemmon	Mount Lemmon Survey	·	1.7 km	MPC · JPL
667903	2011 SM_{349}	—	September 19, 2011	Haleakala	Pan-STARRS 1	·	2.8 km	MPC · JPL
667904	2011 SE_{352}	—	September 18, 2011	Mount Lemmon	Mount Lemmon Survey	·	730 m	MPC · JPL
667905	2011 TM_{1}	—	October 2, 2011	Taunus	R. Kling, Zimmer, U.	·	900 m	MPC · JPL
667906	2011 TY_{1}	—	September 21, 2011	Mayhill-ISON	L. Elenin	·	1.2 km	MPC · JPL
667907	2011 TB_{2}	—	November 19, 2001	Socorro	LINEAR	·	690 m	MPC · JPL
667908	2011 TP_{2}	—	October 1, 2011	Kitt Peak	Spacewatch	·	1.9 km	MPC · JPL
667909	2011 TO_{3}	—	September 28, 2011	Kitt Peak	Spacewatch	·	2.2 km	MPC · JPL
667910	2011 TW_{3}	—	September 23, 2011	Mount Lemmon	Mount Lemmon Survey	MAS	460 m	MPC · JPL
667911	2011 TP_{5}	—	October 4, 2011	Mayhill-ISON	L. Elenin	·	1.4 km	MPC · JPL
667912	2011 TU_{5}	—	October 4, 2011	Les Engarouines	L. Bernasconi	·	2.0 km	MPC · JPL
667913	2011 TV_{6}	—	October 1, 2011	Bergisch Gladbach	W. Bickel	·	1.7 km	MPC · JPL
667914	2011 TE_{7}	—	October 2, 2011	Bergisch Gladbach	W. Bickel	·	2.0 km	MPC · JPL
667915	2011 TD_{8}	—	October 4, 2011	Charleston	R. Holmes	·	1.3 km	MPC · JPL
667916	2011 TM_{8}	—	January 12, 2010	Kitt Peak	Spacewatch	H	420 m	MPC · JPL
667917	2011 TP_{9}	—	October 15, 2011	Catalina	CSS	·	1.1 km	MPC · JPL
667918	2011 TD_{11}	—	August 26, 2011	Piszkéstető	K. Sárneczky	·	2.0 km	MPC · JPL
667919	2011 TC_{13}	—	October 5, 2011	Haleakala	Guido, E.	·	2.0 km	MPC · JPL
667920	2011 TY_{13}	—	October 7, 2011	Charleston	R. Holmes	·	2.4 km	MPC · JPL
667921	2011 TB_{14}	—	September 19, 2001	Socorro	LINEAR	·	600 m	MPC · JPL
667922	2011 TE_{14}	—	September 6, 2002	Socorro	LINEAR	·	2.0 km	MPC · JPL
667923	2011 TJ_{14}	—	December 4, 2007	Kitt Peak	Spacewatch	EUN	1.2 km	MPC · JPL
667924	2011 TK_{14}	—	October 2, 2011	Mayhill-ISON	L. Elenin	TRE	2.5 km	MPC · JPL
667925	2011 TP_{15}	—	September 1, 2002	Palomar	NEAT	·	2.0 km	MPC · JPL
667926	2011 TB_{16}	—	October 1, 2011	Kitt Peak	Spacewatch	·	2.3 km	MPC · JPL
667927	2011 TJ_{16}	—	October 5, 2011	Piszkéstető	K. Sárneczky	LIX	2.8 km	MPC · JPL
667928	2011 TX_{16}	—	September 21, 2011	Haleakala	Pan-STARRS 1	MAS	590 m	MPC · JPL
667929	2011 TU_{17}	—	May 8, 2006	Mount Lemmon	Mount Lemmon Survey	ADE	2.3 km	MPC · JPL
667930	2011 TG_{19}	—	October 3, 2011	XuYi	PMO NEO Survey Program	·	750 m	MPC · JPL
667931	2011 TR_{20}	—	October 4, 2011	Piszkés-tető	K. Sárneczky, S. Kürti	·	1.8 km	MPC · JPL
667932	2011 TZ_{20}	—	October 1, 2011	Catalina	CSS	·	1.9 km	MPC · JPL
667933	2011 TZ_{21}	—	October 1, 2011	Kitt Peak	Spacewatch	·	2.5 km	MPC · JPL
667934	2011 UF_{3}	—	July 31, 2005	Palomar	NEAT	EOS	2.2 km	MPC · JPL
667935	2011 US_{3}	—	October 1, 2000	Socorro	LINEAR	NYS	840 m	MPC · JPL
667936	2011 UV_{9}	—	September 13, 2007	Mount Lemmon	Mount Lemmon Survey	MAS	590 m	MPC · JPL
667937	2011 US_{10}	—	May 11, 2010	Mount Lemmon	Mount Lemmon Survey	·	1.7 km	MPC · JPL
667938	2011 UU_{10}	—	October 16, 2011	Haleakala	Pan-STARRS 1	·	1.1 km	MPC · JPL
667939	2011 UB_{12}	—	October 12, 2007	Dauban	Kugel, C. R. F.	·	1.6 km	MPC · JPL
667940	2011 UT_{12}	—	October 4, 1996	Kitt Peak	Spacewatch	·	970 m	MPC · JPL
667941	2011 UX_{12}	—	July 9, 2002	Palomar	NEAT	·	1.7 km	MPC · JPL
667942	2011 UA_{13}	—	September 23, 2011	Kitt Peak	Spacewatch	·	2.0 km	MPC · JPL
667943	2011 UQ_{13}	—	September 27, 2011	Mount Lemmon	Mount Lemmon Survey	·	2.4 km	MPC · JPL
667944	2011 UJ_{14}	—	October 14, 2007	Mount Lemmon	Mount Lemmon Survey	·	2.0 km	MPC · JPL
667945	2011 UF_{18}	—	October 19, 2011	Kitt Peak	Spacewatch	·	800 m	MPC · JPL
667946	2011 UD_{19}	—	February 28, 2009	Kitt Peak	Spacewatch	·	1.9 km	MPC · JPL
667947	2011 UP_{22}	—	October 16, 2011	Kitt Peak	Spacewatch	·	2.4 km	MPC · JPL
667948	2011 UJ_{24}	—	September 21, 2011	Mount Lemmon	Mount Lemmon Survey	·	540 m	MPC · JPL
667949	2011 UM_{24}	—	October 17, 2011	Kitt Peak	Spacewatch	·	1.6 km	MPC · JPL
667950	2011 UZ_{24}	—	September 28, 2011	Mount Lemmon	Mount Lemmon Survey	·	780 m	MPC · JPL
667951	2011 UN_{25}	—	October 12, 2007	Kitt Peak	Spacewatch	·	1 km	MPC · JPL
667952	2011 UP_{28}	—	August 18, 2001	Palomar	NEAT	·	2.7 km	MPC · JPL
667953	2011 UM_{29}	—	September 21, 2011	Kitt Peak	Spacewatch	EOS	1.6 km	MPC · JPL
667954	2011 UW_{29}	—	October 4, 2002	Palomar	NEAT	EUN	1.2 km	MPC · JPL
667955	2011 US_{30}	—	November 13, 2002	Kitt Peak	Spacewatch	·	1.8 km	MPC · JPL
667956	2011 UX_{32}	—	September 23, 2011	Kitt Peak	Spacewatch	V	630 m	MPC · JPL
667957	2011 UA_{37}	—	October 19, 2011	Mount Lemmon	Mount Lemmon Survey	·	2.4 km	MPC · JPL
667958	2011 UO_{37}	—	September 28, 2011	Ka-Dar	Gerke, V.	·	2.2 km	MPC · JPL
667959	2011 UR_{38}	—	February 22, 2009	Kitt Peak	Spacewatch	·	900 m	MPC · JPL
667960	2011 UV_{39}	—	September 4, 2007	Mount Lemmon	Mount Lemmon Survey	·	840 m	MPC · JPL
667961	2011 UA_{40}	—	December 6, 2007	Mount Lemmon	Mount Lemmon Survey	MIS	2.0 km	MPC · JPL
667962	2011 UB_{42}	—	September 30, 2011	Kitt Peak	Spacewatch	·	950 m	MPC · JPL
667963	2011 UK_{42}	—	February 13, 2009	Great Shefford	Birtwhistle, P.	V	560 m	MPC · JPL
667964	2011 US_{45}	—	March 21, 2009	Mount Lemmon	Mount Lemmon Survey	·	1.8 km	MPC · JPL
667965	2011 UE_{52}	—	October 18, 2011	Kitt Peak	Spacewatch	·	890 m	MPC · JPL
667966	2011 UD_{53}	—	October 7, 2002	Palomar	NEAT	·	1.6 km	MPC · JPL
667967	2011 UR_{53}	—	October 12, 2006	Palomar	NEAT	·	2.0 km	MPC · JPL
667968	2011 UY_{53}	—	September 15, 2006	Kitt Peak	Spacewatch	·	1.6 km	MPC · JPL
667969	2011 UJ_{55}	—	September 24, 2011	Mount Lemmon	Mount Lemmon Survey	·	930 m	MPC · JPL
667970	2011 UU_{55}	—	January 4, 2001	Haleakala	NEAT	·	1.4 km	MPC · JPL
667971	2011 UB_{57}	—	October 18, 2011	Piszkés-tető	K. Sárneczky, A. Szing	H	460 m	MPC · JPL
667972	2011 UD_{65}	—	October 6, 2011	Mount Lemmon	Mount Lemmon Survey	·	2.2 km	MPC · JPL
667973	2011 UH_{66}	—	May 10, 2007	Mount Lemmon	Mount Lemmon Survey	·	540 m	MPC · JPL
667974	2011 UE_{67}	—	October 20, 2011	Mount Lemmon	Mount Lemmon Survey	·	1.1 km	MPC · JPL
667975	2011 UJ_{67}	—	October 20, 2011	Mount Lemmon	Mount Lemmon Survey	·	860 m	MPC · JPL
667976	2011 UW_{67}	—	October 20, 2011	Mount Lemmon	Mount Lemmon Survey	·	1.1 km	MPC · JPL
667977	2011 UP_{68}	—	October 1, 2011	Kitt Peak	Spacewatch	EOS	1.4 km	MPC · JPL
667978	2011 UX_{70}	—	September 27, 2011	Mount Lemmon	Mount Lemmon Survey	·	2.2 km	MPC · JPL
667979	2011 UH_{71}	—	October 22, 2011	Mount Lemmon	Mount Lemmon Survey	·	2.2 km	MPC · JPL
667980	2011 UK_{71}	—	October 22, 2011	Mount Lemmon	Mount Lemmon Survey	·	2.1 km	MPC · JPL
667981	2011 UC_{74}	—	February 1, 2005	Kitt Peak	Spacewatch	·	1.1 km	MPC · JPL
667982	2011 UD_{74}	—	September 28, 2002	Haleakala	NEAT	·	1.8 km	MPC · JPL
667983	2011 UN_{79}	—	September 13, 2007	Catalina	CSS	·	810 m	MPC · JPL
667984	2011 UX_{79}	—	September 25, 2005	Kitt Peak	Spacewatch	·	1.8 km	MPC · JPL
667985	2011 UB_{88}	—	September 18, 2007	Kitt Peak	Spacewatch	·	960 m	MPC · JPL
667986	2011 UB_{89}	—	October 21, 2011	Mount Lemmon	Mount Lemmon Survey	·	2.6 km	MPC · JPL
667987	2011 UO_{89}	—	August 22, 2006	Palomar	NEAT	·	1.7 km	MPC · JPL
667988	2011 UW_{91}	—	September 26, 2011	Kitt Peak	Spacewatch	HYG	1.8 km	MPC · JPL
667989	2011 UM_{92}	—	October 4, 2011	Črni Vrh	Zakrajsek, J.	·	2.0 km	MPC · JPL
667990	2011 US_{93}	—	September 21, 2011	Kitt Peak	Spacewatch	THM	1.6 km	MPC · JPL
667991	2011 UN_{94}	—	September 4, 2011	Haleakala	Pan-STARRS 1	·	1.9 km	MPC · JPL
667992	2011 UM_{97}	—	September 23, 2011	Kitt Peak	Spacewatch	·	2.2 km	MPC · JPL
667993	2011 UH_{98}	—	October 20, 2011	Kitt Peak	Spacewatch	·	1.8 km	MPC · JPL
667994	2011 UJ_{101}	—	September 28, 2011	Kitt Peak	Spacewatch	·	970 m	MPC · JPL
667995	2011 UJ_{103}	—	October 20, 2011	Kitt Peak	Spacewatch	EOS	1.7 km	MPC · JPL
667996	2011 UM_{103}	—	June 10, 2002	Palomar	NEAT	·	1.8 km	MPC · JPL
667997	2011 UH_{104}	—	October 21, 2011	Kitt Peak	Spacewatch	H	430 m	MPC · JPL
667998	2011 UR_{104}	—	February 17, 2009	La Sagra	OAM	MAS	650 m	MPC · JPL
667999	2011 US_{104}	—	November 2, 2000	Kitt Peak	Spacewatch	·	950 m	MPC · JPL
668000	2011 UU_{104}	—	December 3, 2004	Kitt Peak	Spacewatch	NYS	1.1 km	MPC · JPL

back to top

== Meaning of names ==
As minor planet discoveries are confirmed, they are given a permanent number by the IAU's Minor Planet Center (MPC), and the discoverers can then submit names for them, following the IAU's naming conventions. The list below concerns those minor planets in the specified number-range that have received names, and explains the meanings of those names.

Official naming citations of newly named small Solar System bodies are approved and published in a bulletin by IAU's Working Group for Small Bodies Nomenclature (WGSBN). Before May 2021, citations were published in MPC's Minor Planet Circulars for many decades. Recent citations can also be found on the JPL Small-Body Database (SBDB). Until his death in 2016, German astronomer Lutz D. Schmadel compiled these citations into the Dictionary of Minor Planet Names (DMP) and regularly updated the collection.

Based on Paul Herget's The Names of the Minor Planets, Schmadel also researched the unclear origin of numerous asteroids, most of which had been named prior to World War II. This article incorporates text from this source, which is in the public domain: SBDB New namings may only be added to this list below after official publication as the preannouncement of names is condemned. The WGSBN publishes a comprehensive guideline for the naming rules of non-cometary small Solar System bodies.

Named minor planet	Provisional	This minor planet was named for...	Ref · Catalog
667294 Missen	2011 FX_{17}	François Missen (b. 1933), a French journalist, reporter and author.	IAU · 667294
667514 Pozonuñez	2011 LZ_{31}	Francisco Pozo Nuñez, Chilean astrophysicist.	IAU · 667514
667515 Truța	2011 LB_{35}	Raul Cosmin Truța, Romanian astronomy entrepreneur.	IAU · 667515
667531 Ignasiribas	2011 OF	Ignasi Ribas Canudas (b. 1971), a Catalan astrophysicist specialized in exoplanets and stellar physics, known by his contributions to the research of new Earth-like planets.	IAU · 667531
667713 Richardholman	2011 SA_{71}	Richard Holman, an ex-colleague of the discoverer.	IAU · 667713
667772 Wuhsinheng	2011 SO_{169}	Hsin-Heng Wu, astronomer and a professor in the Department of Physics at National Central University.	IAU · 667772
