= Kyffhäuser (Verwaltungsgemeinschaft) =

Coordinates: 51.367°N 11.000°E

Kyffhäuser was a Verwaltungsgemeinschaft ("collective municipality") in the district Kyffhäuserkreis, in Thuringia, Germany. It was disbanded on 31 December 2012. The seat of the Verwaltungsgemeinschaft was in Bendeleben.

The Verwaltungsgemeinschaft Kyffhäuser consisted of the following municipalities:

1. Badra
2. Bendeleben
3. Göllingen
4. Günserode
5. Hachelbich
6. Oberbösa
7. Rottleben
8. Seega
9. Steinthaleben
