= Kyffhäuser =

Mountain range in Germany

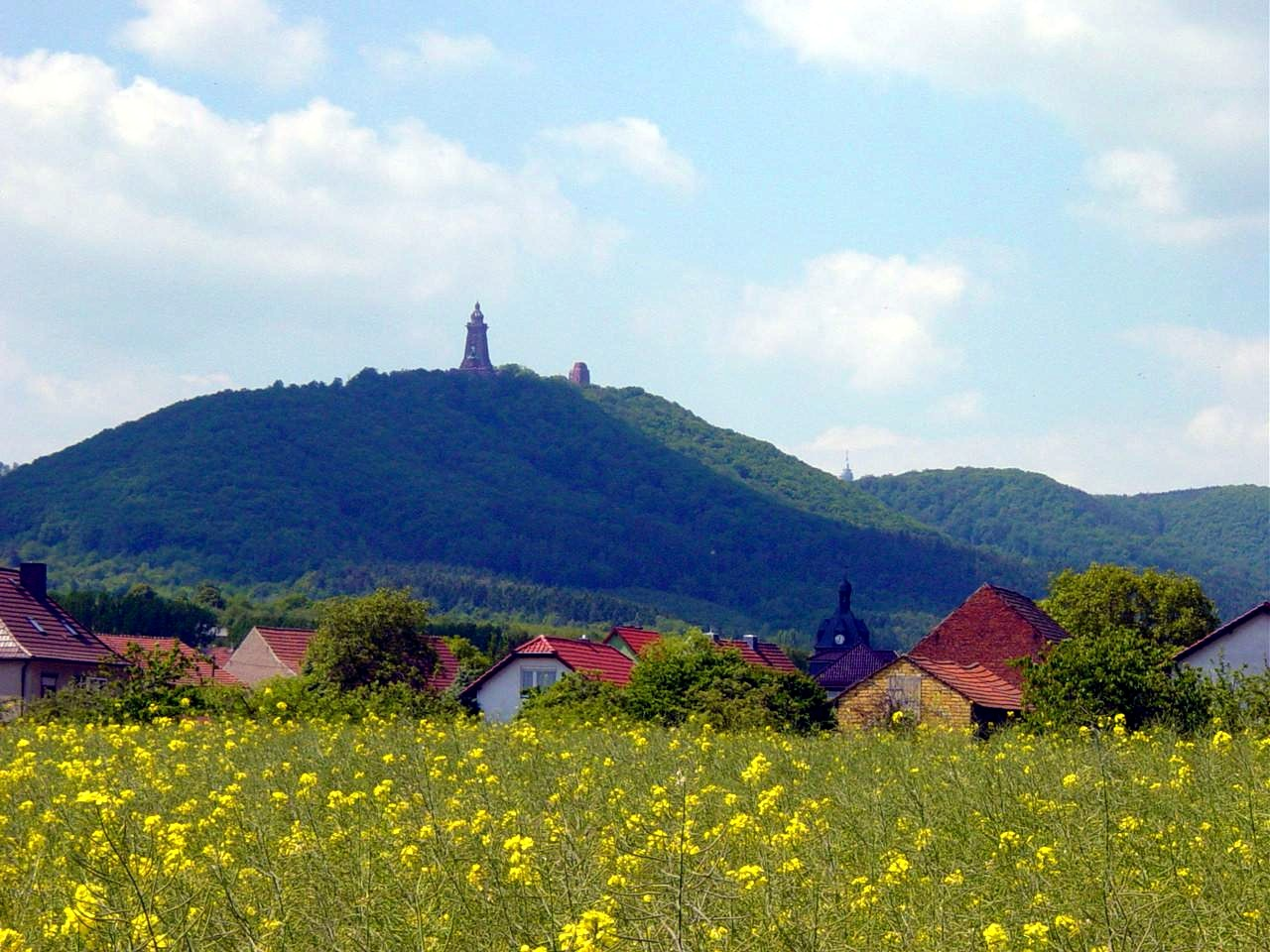
- View from Tilleda of the hills and the Kyffhäuser Monument

Highest point
- Peak: Kulpenberg
- Elevation: 1,553 ft (473 m)
- Coordinates: 51°23′42″N 11°04′27″E

Geography
- Country: Germany
- States: Thuringia; Saxony-Anhalt

Geology
- Orogeny: Variscan
- Rock types: Sandstone; Conglomerate; Carboniferous sedimentary; metamorphic rocks

The Kyffhäuser (German pronunciation: [ˈkɪfˌhɔʏzɐ], sometimes also referred to as Kyffhäusergebirge) is a hill range in Central Germany, shared by Thuringia and Saxony-Anhalt, southeast of the Harz mountains. It reaches its highest point at the Kulpenberg with an elevation of 473.4 m (1,553 ft). The range is the site of medieval Kyffhausen Castle (Reichsburg Kyffhausen) and the 19th century Kyffhäuser Monument; it has significance in German traditional mythology as the legendary resting place of Emperor Frederick Barbarossa.

== Etymology ==
The origin of the name has not been conclusively established. Kyffhäuser (formerly also Kiffhäuser) probably stems from the Low German word cuf 'head' or 'peak', and huse 'house'. Other explanations refer to kiff 'quarrel' and the historic castles at the site.

== Geography ==
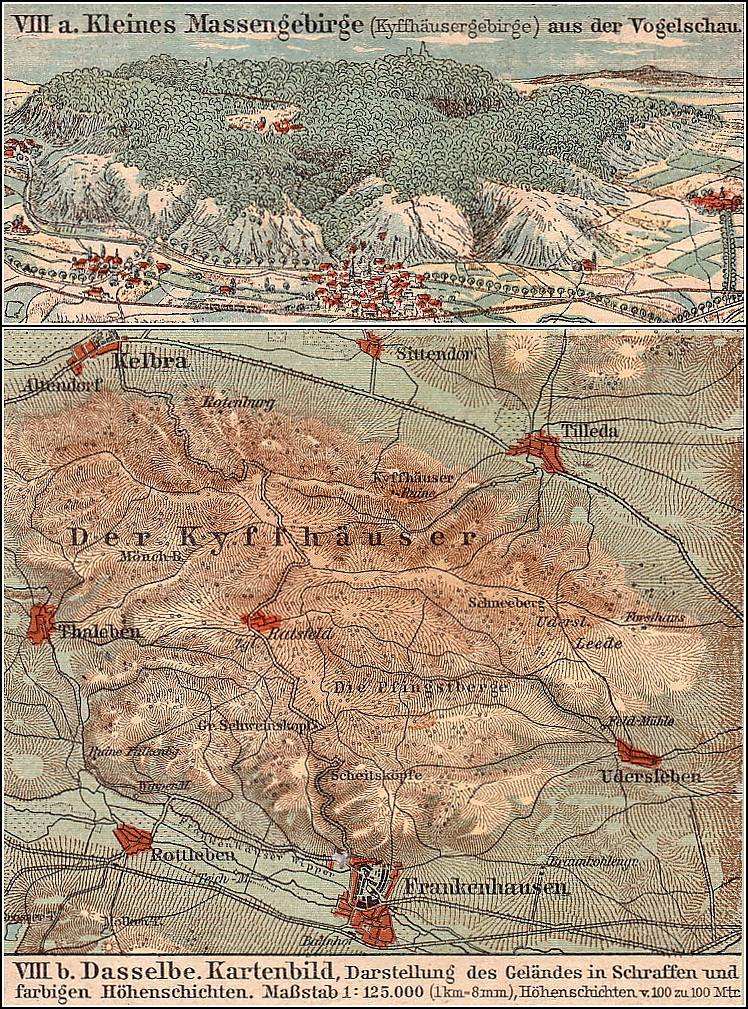
Map of the Kyffhäuser range (about 1913)

The Kyffhäuser is a small Mittelgebirge located in the Kyffhäuserkreis district of Thuringia and the Mansfeld-Südharz district of Saxony-Anhalt, not far from the larger Harz range to the northwest. The range has a length of 19 km (12 mi), from west to east, and a width of 7 km (4.3 mi). The highest point at the Kulpenberg, with the Kulpenburg TV tower, is located near the village of Steinthaleben in Thuringia. The range borders on the Hainleite hill chain and the fertile Goldene Aue basin in the south. Large portions are protected as a nature park.

Some parts of the range on the western and southern slopes are karstified and bare of trees, covered by calcareous grassland. The area shaped by numerous sandstone quarries today is the site of a geopark, comprising the Kyffhäuser Monument, the Barbarossa Cave near Rottleben, the Kaiserpfalz at Tilleda, and the Bilzingsleben Paleolithic site. The Schlachtberg hill on the southeastern rim near Bad Frankenhausen was the site of the decisive Battle of Frankenhausen during the German Peasants' War in 1525, commemorated in the monumental painting Early Bourgeois Revolution in Germany by Werner Tübke.

== History ==
The settlement of Tilleda, located below the northern rim of the range, was already mentioned as Dullide in the early 9th century in the Breviarium Sancti Lulli register of Hersfeld Abbey. A Kaiserpfalz at the site is attested by the 972 Marriage Charter of Empress Theophanu. Numerous stays of her husband Otto II, as well as by his successors Otto III, Conrad II, and Henry III are documented by deeds they issued here.

During the 11th century, Tilleda was superseded by a castle on the hill above the settlement that may have been erected by Emperor Henry IV during the Saxon Rebellion. His son Henry V inherited the quarrels and the castle was finally slighted by the Saxon Duke (and later Emperor) Lothair of Supplinburg in 1119. Lothair himself started the reconstruction in his later years and the Imperial Castle of Kyffhausen, one of the largest castle complexes in Germany, was completed under the Hohenstaufen emperor Frederick Barbarossa. Tilleda was last mentioned as an Imperial castle in 1194, when Frederick's son Henry VI reconciled here with the insurgent Welf duke Henry the Lion.

In 1698 Count Albert Anton of Schwarzburg-Rudolstadt had a Baroque hunting lodge erected at the hamlet of Rathsfeld in the centre of the Kyffhäuser range. Last used as a residence by Prince Günther Victor of Schwarzburg after his abdication in 1918, it was turned into a recreation home of the Kyffhäuserbund veterans' association in 1925. After World War II the remote site became a Young Pioneer camp and a training camp of the East German Gesellschaft für Sport und Technik; since German reunification, the empty premises have decayed.

== Kyffhäuser legend ==
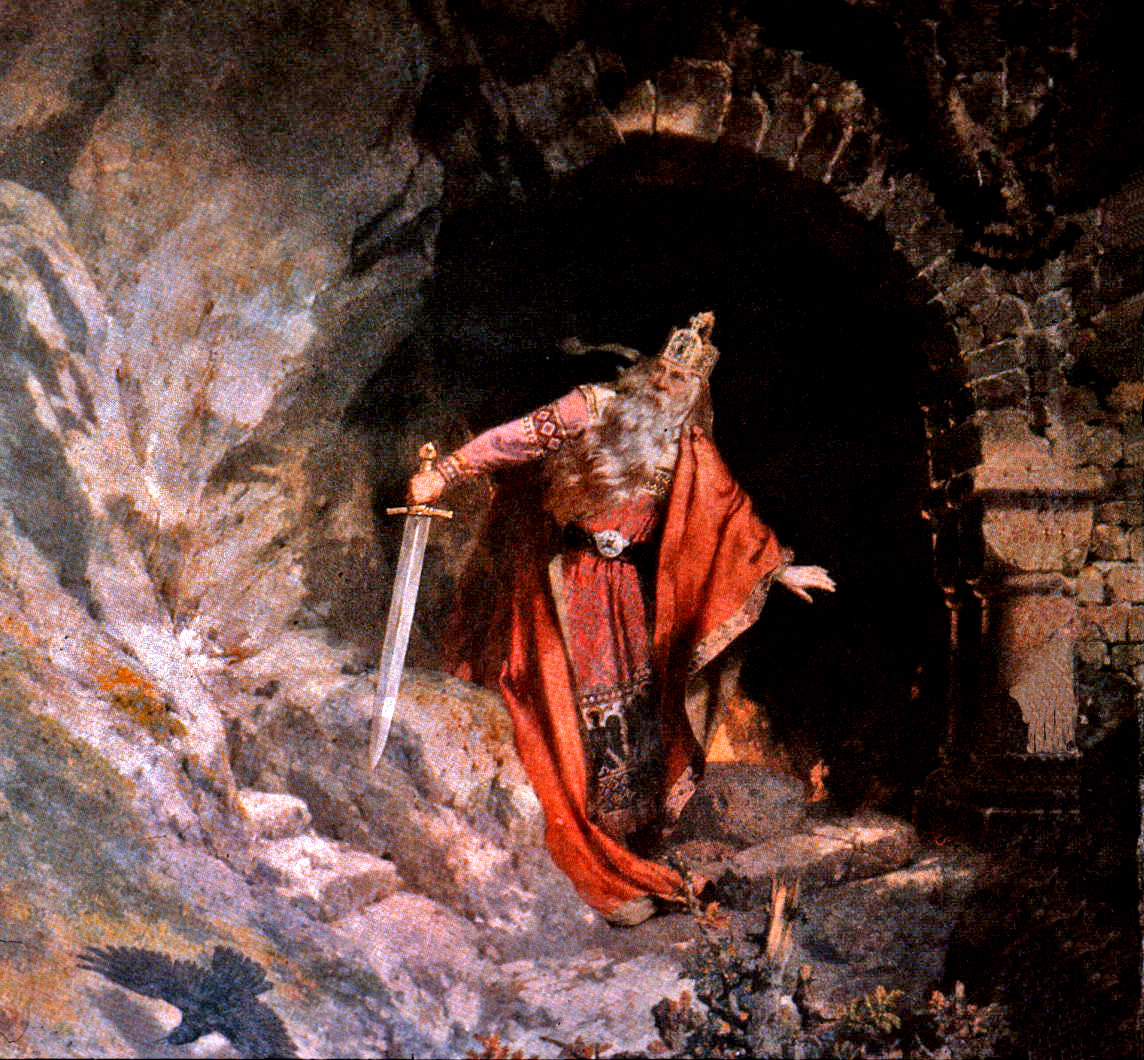
Barbarossa awakens, 19th-century painting by Hermann Wislicenus in the Imperial Palace of Goslar

According to a king asleep in mountain legend, Emperor Frederick Barbarossa, who actually drowned on 10 June 1190 in the Calycadnus River near Seleukeia in Asia Minor during the Third Crusade, is not in fact dead, but sleeps in a hidden chamber underneath the Kyffhäuser hills. He sits motionless at a stone table and his beard has supposedly grown so long over the centuries that it grew through the table. As in the similar legend of King Arthur, Barbarossa supposedly awaits Germany's hour of greatest need, when he will emerge once again from under the hill. The presence of ravens circling the Kyffhäuser summit is said to be a sign of Barbarossa's continuing presence. Similar rapture legends refer to Emperor Frederick II or to Charlemagne sleeping in the Untersberg near Salzburg.

The Barbarossa myth was first documented in the late 17th century and later popularized by the Brothers Grimm and a poem written in 1817 by Friedrich Rückert. Frequently taken up by Romantic authors, and satirized in Germany. A Winter's Tale by Heinrich Heine, it became the expression of the desire for the Old Empire's re-emergence as a German nation state. When the Kyffhäuser Monument was built at the ruins of the Imperial Castle in 1890–1896, with a statue of Frederick Barbarossa and an Emperor William monument, the German Emperor Wilhelm I was thought to have "laid to rest" Barbarossa by the 1871 unification of Germany.

== Today ==
Today, the hills are a popular tourist site, featuring the restored medieval Reichsburg Kyffhausen complex, including a small museum and the castle well, at 176 m (577 ft) depth said to be "the deepest castle well in the world". The downhill Pfalz of Tilleda is an archaeological open-air museum and a stop on the scenic Romanesque Road.

The range is also the site of an annual touring car hillclimbing and of the Kyffhäuser-Berglauf cross country running competition. The range is a popular destination for hikers; the Kaiser Way leads across the Kyffhäuser northwards to the Harz mountains.

== See also ==
There is a video game based on this story, called The longing.

- List of mountains and hills of Thuringia
- Sebastianism
