= Kyffhäuser Monument =

Late 19th century colossal monument in Germany

- Kyffhäuserdenkmal
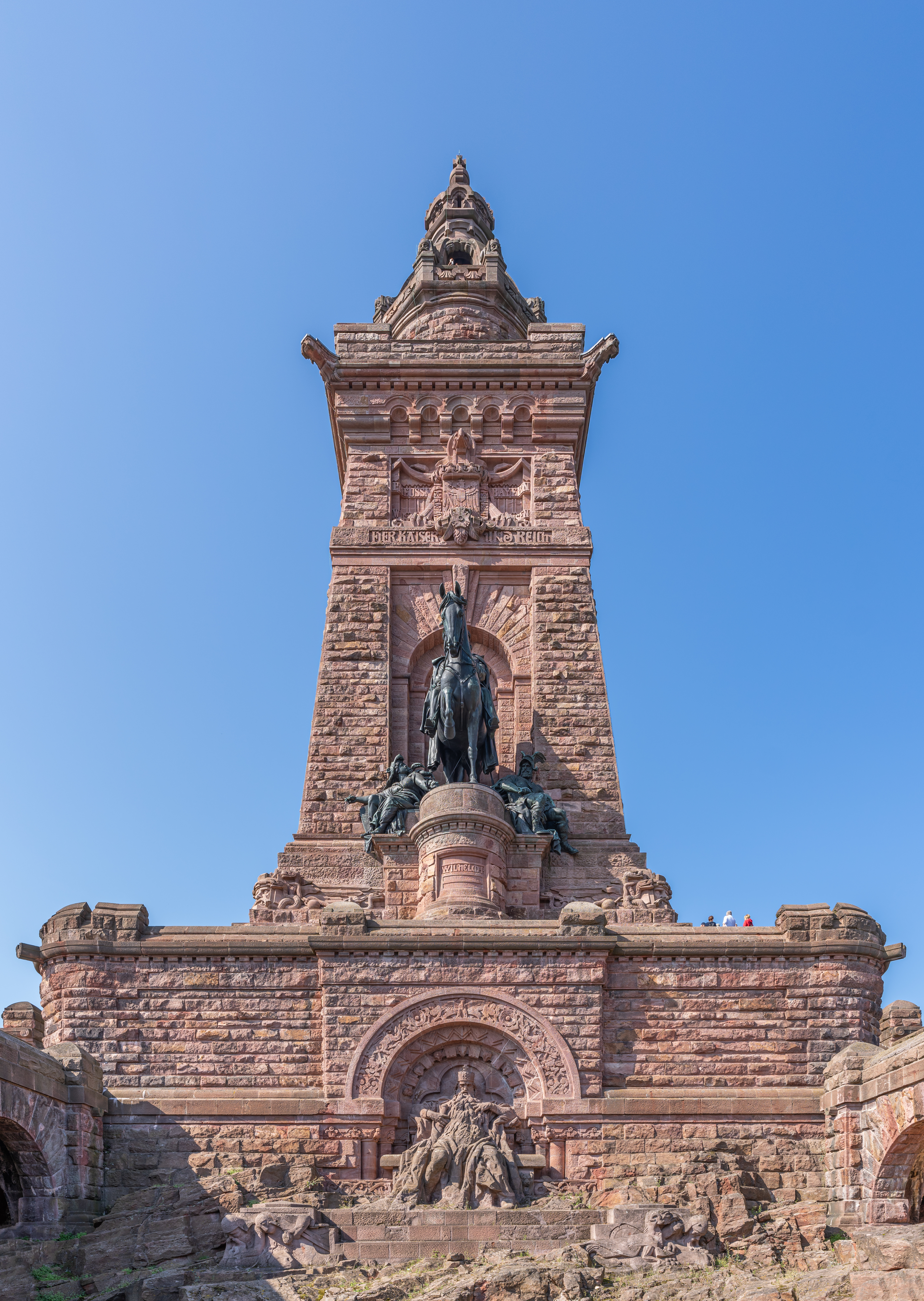
- Central tower and equestrian statue of Emperor William I
- Interactive map of Kyffhäuser Monument
- Location: Steinthaleben community, Thuringia, Germany
- Coordinates: 51°24′47″N 11°06′35″E
- Designer: Bruno Schmitz
- Material: Copper plates on iron frame, red sandstone
- Height: 81 metres (266 ft)
- Completion date: 1896
- Dedicated to: William I, Frederick I

Aerial views of Kyffhäuser Monument.

The Kyffhäuser Monument (German: Kyffhäuserdenkmal), also known as Barbarossa Monument (Barbarossadenkmal), is an Emperor William monument in the Kyffhäuser mountain range in the German state of Thuringia. It was erected from 1890 to 1896 atop the ruins of the medieval Kyffhausen Castle near Bad Frankenhausen.

Designed by architect Bruno Schmitz (1858–1916), it is the third-largest monument in Germany. Schmitz has also designed the two largest memorials, the Monument to the Battle of the Nations, that commemorates the 1813 Battle of Leipzig and the Emperor William Monument at the Porta Westfalica.

== Geography ==
The monument has a total height of 81 m (266 ft) and is located at an elevation of 420 m (1,380 ft) on top of an 800 m (2,600 ft) long outcrop of the eastern Kyffhäuser range, below the 439 m (1,440 ft) high mountain peak of the Kyffhausen Castle. The site lies within the Steinthaleben community in the Kyffhäuserland district, about 6.5 km (4.0 mi) north of Bad Frankenhausen and southwest of Tilleda in the Goldene Aue plain.

== History ==
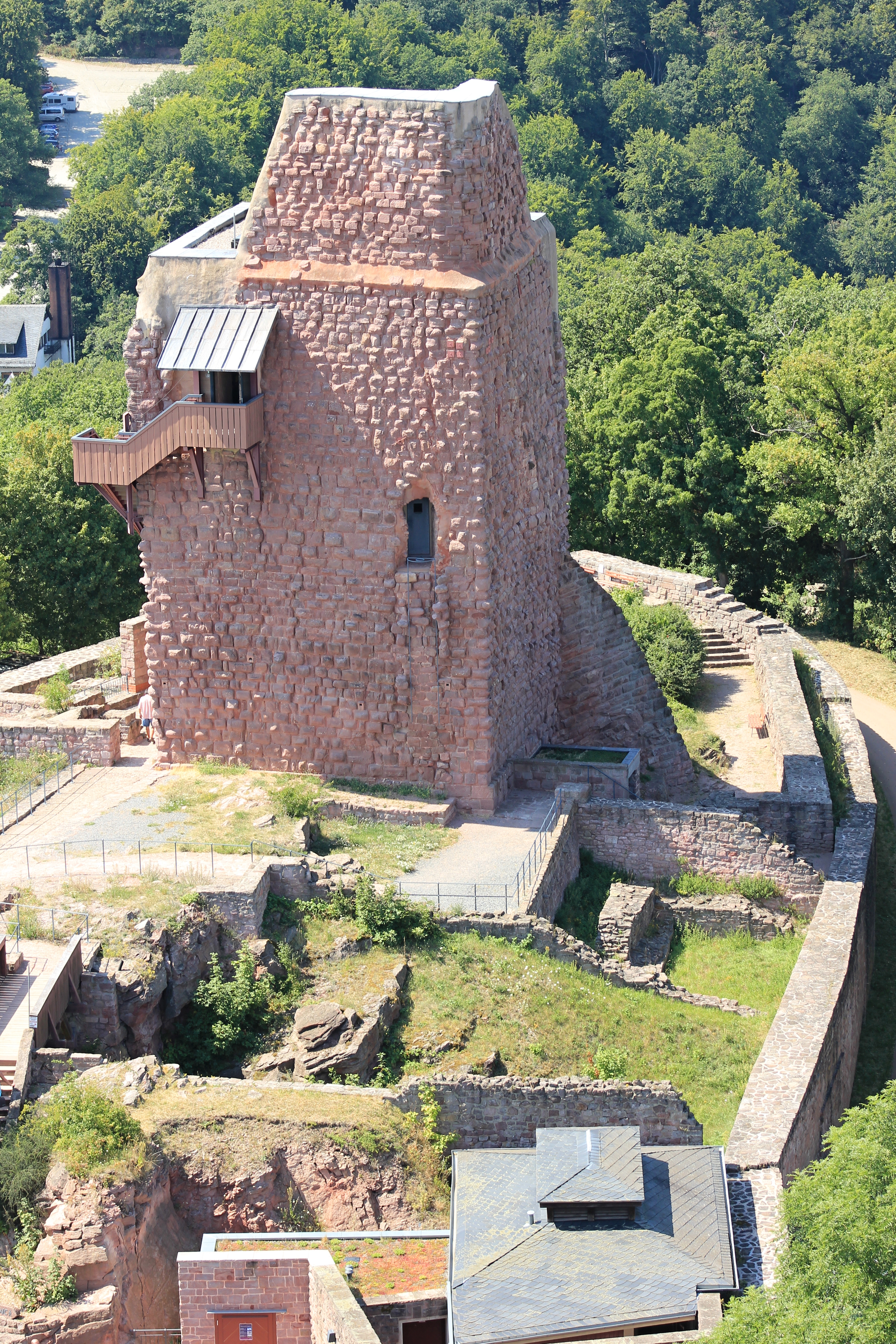
Ruins of the medieval Kyffhausen Castle

After the 1888 death of emperor William I, numerous memorials were erected in his honour all over Germany. The Kyffhäuser Monument had initially been proposed by the 19th century War Veterans Federation (Deutscher Kriegerbund), which as Kyffhäuser Federation (Kyffhäuserbund) took over its management around 1900. Architect Bruno Schmitz drew up plans in accordance with the late 19th century tradition of imperial grandeur, realized in massive stone structures like the Walhalla in Bavaria, the Hermannsdenkmal in the Teutoburg Forest, and the Niederwalddenkmal near Rüdesheim.

The monument sits among the ruins (the upper and lower castle) of the medieval Imperial castle of Kyffhausen, that, built beginning around 1,000 AD, reached its maximal extent during the reign of the Hohenstaufen emperor Frederick I Barbarossa. Curious evidence of the medieval imperial castle has been preserved, such as the world's deepest castle well of 176 m (577 ft) depth. The 17 m (56 ft) high keep on the site of the former upper Kyffhausen castle is accessible and houses two exhibitions. Parts of the old gate structures have also been preserved. The Castle Museum focuses on the history of the ancient castle complex, the Barbarossa Saga and the construction history of the Emperor Wilhelm monument. The Museum also exhibits numerous artefacts, that were unearthed during excavations and conservation work by the Kyffhäuser Federation in and around the medieval castle.

Architect Bruno Schmitz had borrowed romanesque style elements from the Hohenstaufen castles and fortresses of the 12th and 13th centuries for his Monument walls and towers. The roughly hewn stones are reminiscent of the Hohenstaufen hump block masonry, that were also used on the Barbarossa tower. The 1871 founded Prussian-dominated empire, was to be understood as the legitimate successor to the medieval Holy Roman Empire. It also signifies the national theme of decline and rebirth.

== Features ==
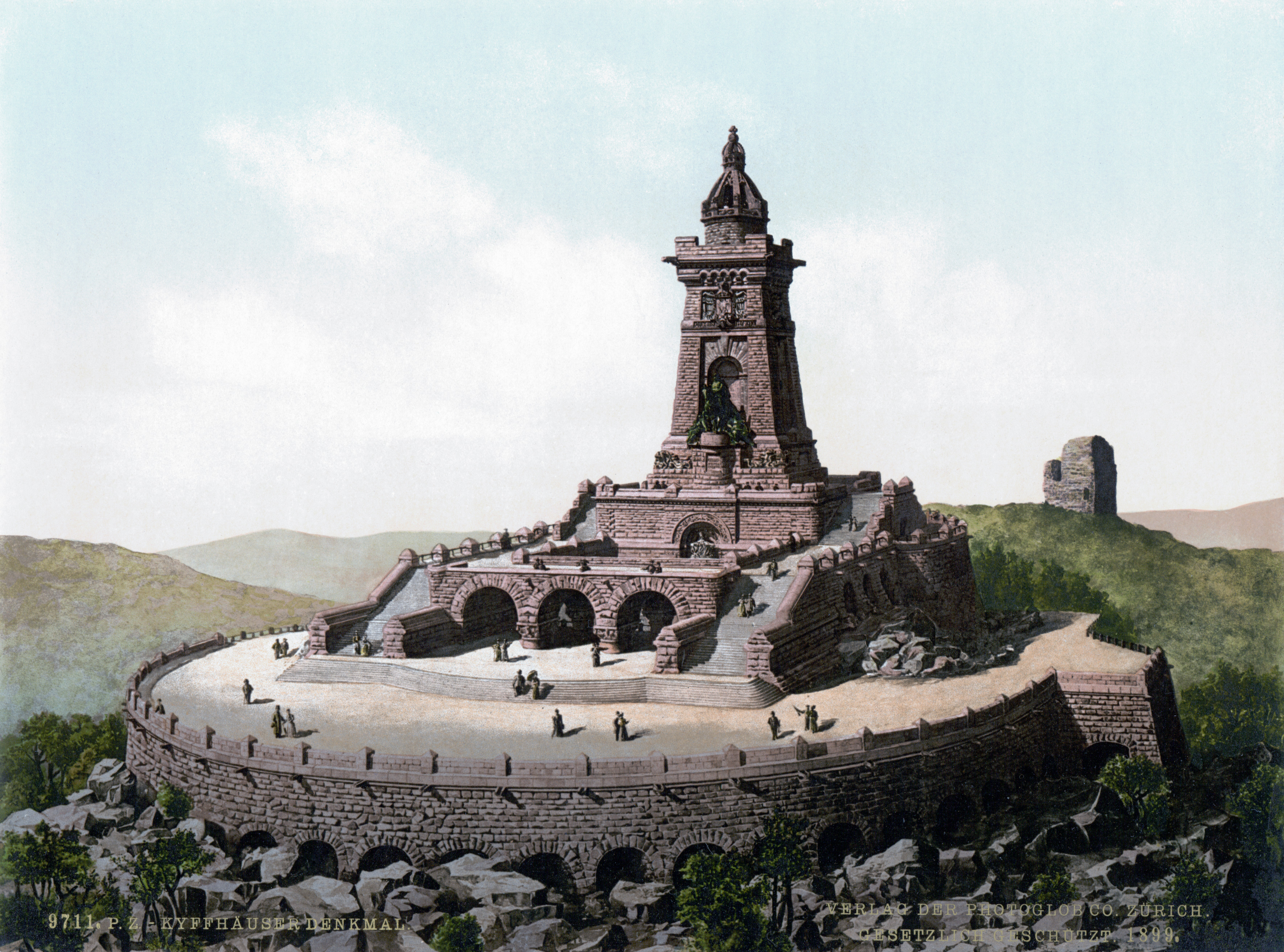
The monument around 1900

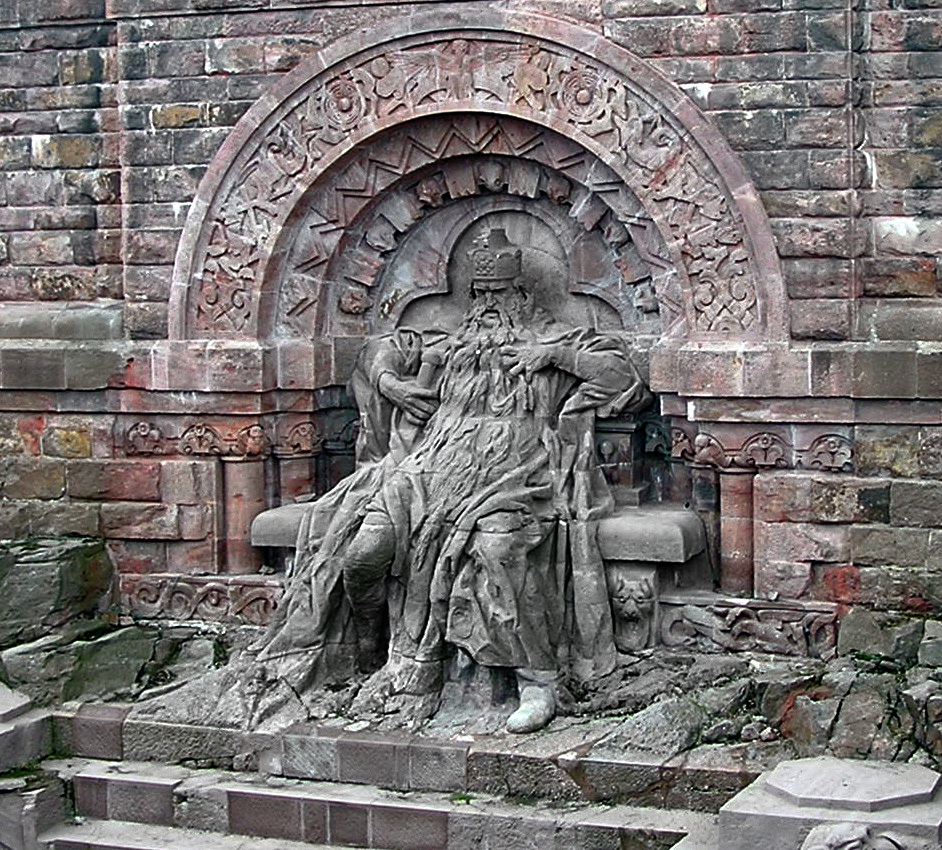
Sculpture of Frederick Barbarossa

A small, scenic stone quarry surrounded by terraces on the east side of the monument forms the backdrop for the emperor Frederick Barbarossa sandstone sculpture created by Nikolaus Geiger (1849–1897). The 6.5 m (21 ft) high figure was fashioned on site from several sandstone blocks. At its feet linger knights, mythical creatures and members of his court, with whom the old emperor is lying in wait for resurrection in his underground dungeon. The Barabarossa legend holds, that he would rise again when Germany was in need of his leadership. The emperor himself is depicted as one might imagine an ancient powerful monarch in poems and legends at the very moment of awakening. Sculptor Nikolaus Geiger decorated the emperor's red beard with the imperial crown, as its original is on display in the Vienna Hofburg.

Above him towers an equestrian statue of Emperor William I, designed by sculptor Emil Hundrieser (1846–1911) in Neo-baroque style. Wilhelm is depicted as a general, with Pickelhaube and Grand Cross of the Iron Cross, he poses on horseback in a dignified manner. He is flanked by two allegorical sculptures. To the right a Germanic warrior, who represents defense and to the left a woman, holding a pen and an oak leaf wreath, symbolizing history. Both, the Barbarossa and the Wilhelm sculptures represent the idea of the monument's program - the glorification of the monarchy and the military strength of the empire. The whole group has a height of almost 11 m (36 ft) and weighs around 16 tons. The driven copper sheets have a thickness of 2 to 3 mm (0.079 to 0.118 in).

The Wilhelm sculpture is attached to a 57-metre (187 ft) tower, which is topped by a huge imperial crown. A 247-step stairway leads to a platform on top of the tower, that offers a panoramic view over the Kyffhäuser range to the Harz mountains in the north and down to the Thuringian Forest in the south.

Since 2014 the site is run by the Kur & Tourismus GmbH Bad Frankenhausen after the Kyffhäuser-Tourismusverband had run into financial difficulties.

== See also ==
- Barbarossa Cave
- Cultural depictions of Frederick Barbarossa
