= Kyffhausen Castle =

Medieval castle ruin

Coordinates: 51°24′46″N 11°06′30″E

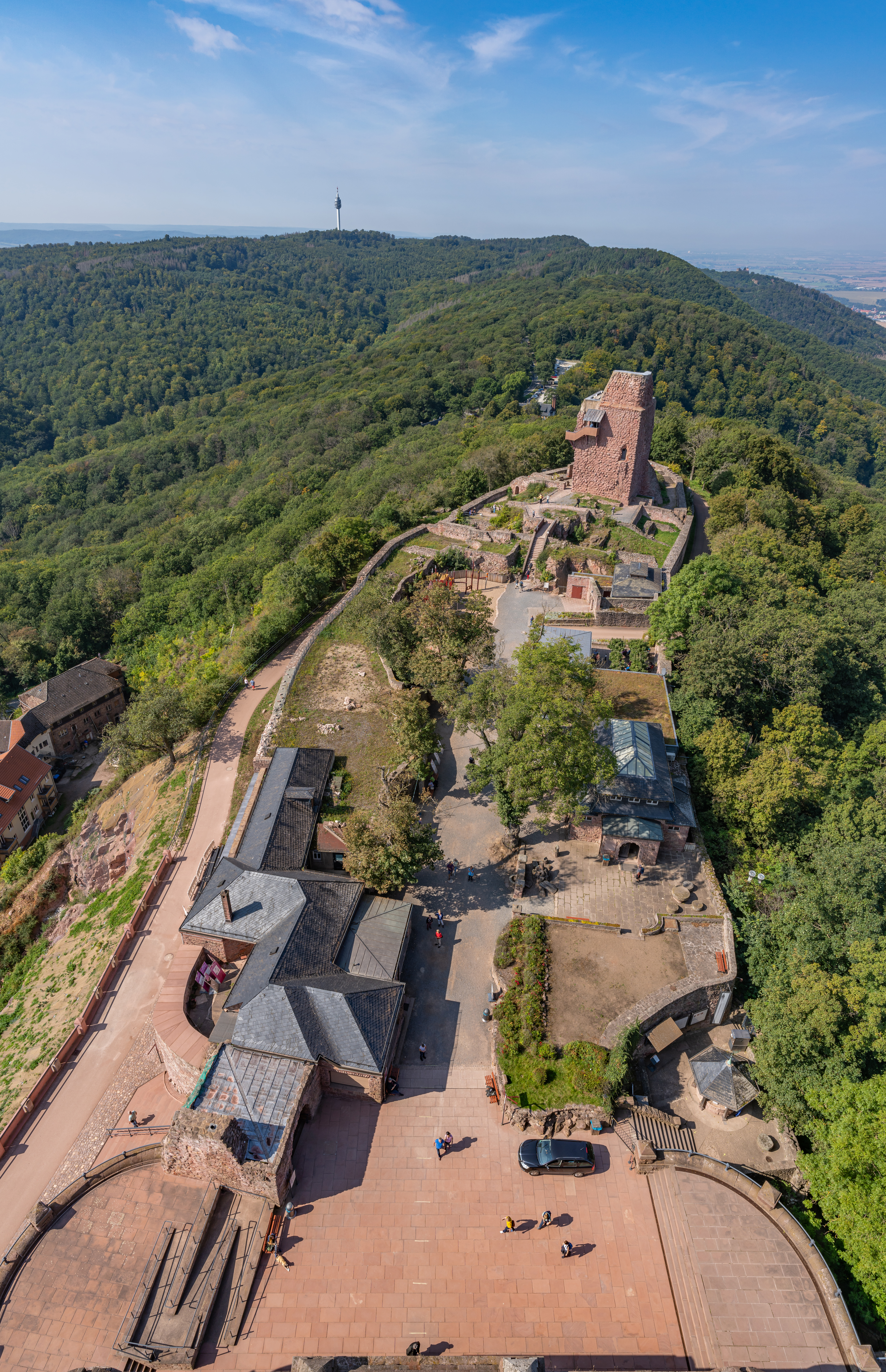
Castle complex with Barbarossa Tower, view from Kyffhäuser Monument

The Imperial Castle of Kyffhausen (German: Reichsburg Kyffhausen) is a medieval castle ruin, situated in the Kyffhäuser hills in the German state of Thuringia, close to its border with Saxony-Anhalt. Probably founded about 1000, it superseded the nearby imperial palace (Kaiserpfalz) of Tilleda under the rule of the Hohenstaufen emperors during the 12th and 13th centuries. Together with the Kyffhäuser Monument, erected on the castle grounds between 1890 and 1896, it is today a popular tourist destination. The castle is variously known in English as Kyffhausen Castle, (Note: See e.g. in Goebel, Stefan (2007). The Great War and Medieval Memory. Cambridge: CUP. p. 265: "Amidst the ruins of Kyffhausen Castle...") Kyffhauser Castle, (Note: See e.g. Barrowclough, David (2017). Digging for Hitler. Fonthill. "Schirmer was recommended to him for his work at the Ahnenerbe's Kyffhauser Castle dig...") Kyffhäuser Castle, (Note: See e.g. Willson, A Leslie (2015). Surveys and Soundings in European Literature. Princeton: PUP. p. 7: "As late as 1546 an insane tailor was found in the ruins of Kyffhäuser Castle...") and Kyffhaueser Castle. (Note: See e.g. Kim, Hoo (2007). Art of Success. New Day. p. 120: "Among Germans, a folk belief is widespread that he didn't die but is asleep in Kyffhaueser Castle...)

== Location ==
The ruins of the imperial castle of Kyffhausen are located on the northeastern rim of the range on a hill, the Kyffhäuserburgberg (439.7 m above sea level (NN)), an approximately 800 m (2,600 ft) long eastern spur. The castle is in the parish of Steinthaleben, about 3 km (1.9 mi) northeast of the village of Rathsfeld, in the Thuringian municipality of Kyffhäuserland, near the town of Bad Frankenhausen in Kyffhäuserkreis. The Goldene Aue ("Golden Water Meadows", ca. 160 m above NN) plain to the north, including the villages of Sittendorf and Tilleda roughly 280 metres below, are parts of the municipality of Kelbra in the Mansfeld-Südharz district of Saxony-Anhalt.

The castle grounds are part of the Kyffhäuser Nature Park – situated about 300 m (980 ft) south of its northern boundary.

== History ==
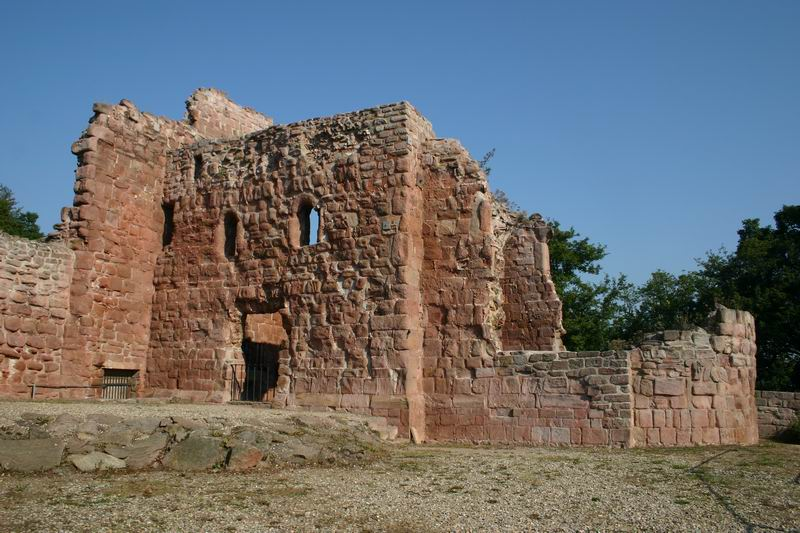
Castle chapel in the lower ward

Archaeological findings of several shoe-last celts at the summit denote a settlement already in the Neolithic period. Excavated Bronze Age ceramics may stem from devastated tumuli erected on the prominent spur. In the 1930s, remnants of fortress dating from the Hallstatt era were discovered.

A first castle high above the Tilleda Kaiserpfalz was probably erected under the rule of the Salian emperor Henry IV, in order to protect his royal domains south of the Harz mountains. Nevertheless, it was not mentioned until 1118, when it was demolished by the Saxon duke Lothair of Supplinburg after his forces had defeated Emperor Henry V at the 1115 Battle of Welfesholz.

Reconstruction started shortly afterwards and was accomplished under the rule of the Hohenstaufen emperor Frederick Barbarossa, who stayed downhill at Tilleda several times. The rebuilt castle complex of bright red sandstone then spread over large parts of the Kyffhäuserberg ridge; administrated by Hohenstaufen ministeriales, it was meant as an expression of imperial power in the region.

After the fall of the House of Hohenstaufen, the fortress lost its strategic importance. Rudolf of Habsburg, elected King of the Romans in 1273, ceded the premises to the Counts of Beichlingen, who from 1375 held the castle as vassals of the Wettin landgraves of Thuringia. Given in pawn to the comital House of Schwarzburg shortly afterwards and seized by the Counts of Schwarzburg-Rudolstadt in 1407, the fortress was already mentioned as a ruin in the 15th century.

From the time of Weimar Classicism in the late 18th century, even more in the Romantic era, the picturesque castle ruins became a popular destination for writers such as Johann Wolfgang von Goethe, who wandered in the Kyffhäuser range together with Duke Karl August of Saxe-Weimar in 1776. The legend of Frederick Barbarossa asleep in the mountain, perpetuated by Friedrich Rückert in an 1817 poem, became a symbol of rising German nationalism, illustrated by regular meetings of Burschenschaft fraternities and finally by the erection of the Kyffhäuser Monument from 1890 onwards. In 1900 the Kyffhäuserbund veterans' and reservists' association took its name from the historic site.

== Literature ==
- Wolfgang Timpel: Die mittelalterliche Keramik der Kyffhäuserburgen. In: Paul Grimm: Tilleda. Eine Königspfalz am Kyffhäuser. Vol. 2: Die Vorburg und Zusammenfassung (= Schriften zur Ur- und Frühgeschichte. Vol. 40). Akademie-Verlag, Berlin, 1990, ISBN 3-05-000400-2, pp. 249ff.
- Hansjürgen Brachmann: Zum Burgenbau salischer Zeit zwischen Harz und Elbe. In: Horst Wolfgang Böhme (ed.): Burgen der Salierzeit. Vol. 1: In den nördlichen Landschaften des Reiches (= Römisch-Germanisches Zentralmuseum zu Mainz, RGZM, Forschungsinstitut für Vor- und Frühgeschichte. Monographien 25). Thorbecke, Sigmaringen, 1991, ISBN 3-7995-4134-9, pp. 97–148, specifically pp. 118–120, 129 ff. (Cat. No. 2–3).
- Holger Reinhardt: Zum Dualismus von Materialfarbigkeit und Fassung an hochmittelalterlichen Massivbauten. Neue Befunde aus Thüringen. In: Burgen und Schlösser in Thüringen. Vol. 1, 1996, ISSN 1436-0624, pp. 70–84.
- Karl Peschel: Höhensiedlungen der älteren vorrömischen Eisenzeit nördlich des Thüringer Waldes. In: Albrecht Jockenhövel (ed.): Ältereisenzeitliches Befestigungswesen zwischen Maas/Mosel und Elbe (= Veröffentlichungen der Altertumskommission für Westfalen. Vol. 11). Internationales Kolloquium am 8. November 1997 in Münster anlässlich des hundertjährigen Bestehens der Altertumskommission für Westfalen. Aschendorff, Münster, 1999, ISBN 3-402-05036-6, pp. 125–158, especially pp. 134 and 139, Abb. 10 and 150.
- Thomas Bienert: Mittelalterliche Burgen in Thüringen. 430 Burgen, Burgruinen und Burgstätten. Wartberg, Gudensberg-Gleichen, 2000, ISBN 3-86134-631-1, pp. 166–172.
- Dankwart Leistikow: Die Rothenburg am Kyffhäuser. In: Burgen und frühe Schlösser in Thüringen und seinen Nachbarländern (= Forschungen zu Burgen und Schlössern. Vol. 5). Deutscher Kunstverlag, Munich etc., 2000, ISBN 3-422-06263-7, pp. 31–46 (here also a short summary of the Imperial Castle of Kyffhausen with a comprehensive bibliography).
- Ralf Rödger, Petra Wäldchen: Kyffhäuser, Burg und Denkmal (= Schnell Kunstführer. Bd. 2061). 11th, fully revised edition. Schnell und Steiner, Regensburg, 2003, ISBN 3-7954-5791-2.
- Heinrich Schleiff: Denkmalpflege an den Kyffhäuser-Burganlagen und dem Kaiser-Wilhelm-National-Denkmal von 1990–2003. In: Aus der Arbeit des Thüringischen Landesamtes für Denkmalpflege (= Arbeitsheft des Thüringischen Landesamtes für Denkmalpflege. Neue Folge Bd. 13). Vol. 1. Thüringisches Landesamt für Denkmalpflege, Erfurt, 2003, ISBN 3-910166-93-8, pp. 122–128.
