= Seegar =

Seegar may refer to:

- Edward Seegar (c. 1685 – 1721), Irish-born British pirate and privateer
- Miriam Seegar (1907–2011), American silent film actress
- Sara Seegar (1914–1990), American stage, film, radio, and television actress, sister of Miriam

== See also ==
- Seega, German village
- Stacy Seegars (born c. 1972), former American football player
