= The Longing =

2020 video game

- Promotional art
- Developer: Studio Seufz
- Publisher: Application Systems Heidelberg
- Director: Anselm Pyta
- Producer: Stefan Michel
- Programmers: Thomas Krüger; Anselm Pyta
- Artist: Anselm Pyta
- Composers: Jan Roth; Jürgen Härtenstein; Anselm Pyta
- Engine: Unity
- Platforms: Windows; macOS; Linux; Switch; Android; iOS
- Release: Windows, macOS, Linux; March 5, 2020; Switch; April 14, 2021; Android, iOS; December 18, 2023
- Genres: Point-and-click adventure, idle
- Mode: Single-player

The Longing is a 2020 point-and-click adventure game created by independent developer Studio Seufz. Set in an underground kingdom, the player controls the Shade, a creature tasked with watching over a sleeping king for 400 days. The Shade performs recreational activities, including reading and exploring, as it waits out the 400 days in real time. The in-game timer can continue regardless of the player's actions, but moves faster if the Shade performs certain actions inside its home, such as decorating the walls with drawings.

Developer Anselm Pyta conceived of The Longing after hearing the Kyffhäuser legend while visiting the Barbarossa Cave. Pyta sought to explore emotional themes in a narrative-driven story and used time as a game mechanism. The developer was inspired by dungeon synth music, which helped him define the subterranean atmosphere and theme of loneliness. Pyta acted as the primary developer for most of the game's six-year production, having to rely upon personal intuition to design the pacing due to playtesting difficulties.

The Longing was first released for Windows, macOS, and Linux on March 5, 2020. It gained praise for its soundtrack, visuals, and experimental nature, but the slow-paced gameplay divided critics. The game was released during the COVID-19 pandemic, and many commentators compared it to life under quarantine. The Longing was a finalist for the Nuovo Award at the 2020 Independent Games Festival and won the "Best Debut" award at the 2020 Deutscher Computerspielpreis.

== Gameplay ==
The decorations and pastimes within the Shade's home cause the timer to advance faster.

The Longing is a point-and-click adventure game that takes place in an underground kingdom. The player controls the Shade, a lonely creature serving an elderly king. After the king falls asleep to regain his diminished powers, the Shade is tasked with awakening its master after 400 days in real time. The Shade can explore caves, gather resources to furnish its home, or perform other activities such as reading classical literature and drawing.

Interaction with the world is slow-paced, with the Shade's walking speed being particularly slow. Many aspects of gameplay depend upon the passage of time, including puzzles that require the player to wait for a certain period to progress. Performing actions inside the Shade's home causes time to pass at an increased rate. For example, reading books and decorating the walls with drawings makes the in-game timer advance more rapidly.

Other mechanics are reminiscent of idle games, which share a common theme of progressing despite little or no interaction, including when the game is closed. The player can cause the Shade to perform several tasks without outside input, such as reading books. Another mechanism called the "bookmark system" can be accessed through a menu, and the player can use it to instruct the Shade to automatically walk to a previously saved location, return to its home, or randomly wander around. The player is provided a to-do list of things to improve the Shade's life, but no interaction is required to advance the timer, and it continues even if the game is not open. (Note: An area called the "Halls of Eternity" can prevent the passage of time.) As a result, it is possible to finish The Longing by simply starting the game, closing it, and returning after the timer has elapsed. To prevent cheating, players are sent to a dungeon if they attempt to circumvent the time limit by changing their computer's system clock. The Longing features several endings, and not all require the player to wait out the 400 days.

== Plot ==
The Longing begins with an old king informing the Shade that he will sleep for 400 days to recover his powers. After that time has passed, the Shade may awaken its master, and will be rewarded with "a world without longing". The king permits the Shade to wander inside his underground kingdom but warns it against leaving. While waiting to awaken the king, the Shade contemplates its own loneliness and muses over the nature of the king's reward. It considers leaving the kingdom for the outside world and recalls that an exit from the caves exists far above where the king sleeps.

If the Shade waits all 400 days and awakens its master, the stirring of the king causes a cave-in. Once the event subsides, the king explains that he has given the Shade exactly what he promised and created a world without longing "by destroying everything inside of it". The world ceases to exist, and the king and Shade rule over the endless void of the universe for eternity. Alternatively, if the Shade explores enough of the caves close to the surface world, it discovers a dark cavern at the edge of a bottomless pit. The Shade can either commit suicide by throwing itself into the pit, or continue onward to face the Darkness, a mysterious creature that resembles the Shade in appearance. Depending on how the player previously interacted with the Shade, it will either hide itself from the Darkness by closing its eyes, or be caught by the creature and sent back to its home.

If the Shade hides from the Darkness and continues walking, it arrives at a cave just below the surface. There, the Shade is given the option of abandoning the kingdom by leaving through a well. If the Shade decides to leave, it is taken out of the well by either a young troll, who drops the Shade back down the well to its death, or an elderly man. If the Shade is taken out by the man, the creature follows him to his home and is served dinner by his family. A post-credits scene shows that the Shade's departure has caused the king to die.

== Development and release ==
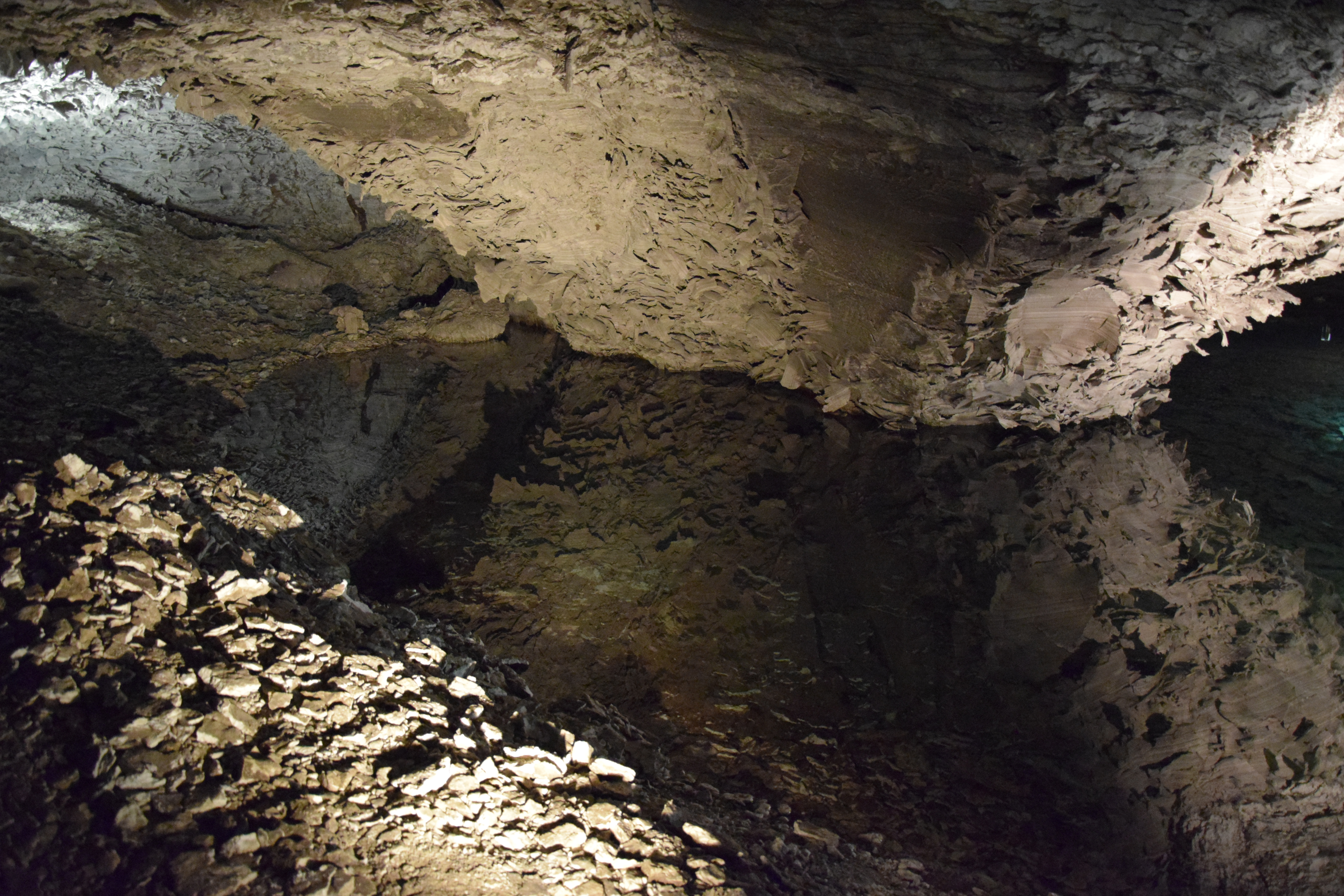
Developer Anselm Pyta was inspired to create The Longing after exploring the Barbarossa Cave (pictured).

Development of The Longing began in 2014 and lasted six years. Developer Anselm Pyta had a background creating Flash animations that were released on Newgrounds, until he co-founded Studio Seufz in 2017. The concept for The Longing came from Pyta's experience hiking in the Barbarossa Cave. According to the Kyffhäuser legend, the cave was home to an old king who slept inside for hundreds of years; a related poem mentioned a dwarf checking on the king once per century to see if he would awaken. Pyta was struck by the character, perplexed about how the dwarf lived its life with so much waiting. He created most of the game alone, including its art, sound design, and mechanics, but received some help with the coding. He used Photoshop to draw the backgrounds, and Adobe Flash to animate the characters; both elements were coded and merged in Unity.

The Longing was influenced by idle games such as Clicker Heroes. Although he was impressed with their ability to progress when not in use, Pyta disliked their lack of endings. He sought to create a story-focused idle game containing elements of adventure games with emotional stakes. Pyta was especially interested in exploring time-based and waiting mechanics, believing that video games are the only medium that could uniquely use extended time to tell a story. Though waiting is often seen as a negative by players, he believed that it could cultivate user investment if combined with a strong story.

Pyta defined The Longing's theme of loneliness while he was studying, and the lonely and subterranean atmosphere was inspired by dungeon synth music. He imagined three possible routes that the player could take: waiting idly for the timer to advance, trying to make the Shade's life comfortable during the 400 days, or abandoning the king and leaving the caves. Waiting offered a stress-free way of playing the game; leaving forced the player to solve puzzles and navigate increasingly dangerous caves. He described the greatest development challenge as coming up with novel ways to use the waiting mechanic without too much repetition.

The Shade was purposefully designed with a cryptic appearance and motivation so the audience could project their own feelings onto the character. Due to the game's long duration, Pyta had difficulty with playtesting, and had to use personal intuition to pace The Longing and ensure that players would not give up. He realized that empathy between the player and the protagonist would be essential to retaining user interest. To show players that progress was being made, he implemented behaviors for the Shade that changed as time passed, such as self-talking and sleeping. Rocks falling in the cave were added to record the passing of time in lieu of a day–night cycle.

Prior to launch, the game was featured at PAX West in 2019. The Longing was published by Application Systems Heidelberg and released on March 5, 2020, to Steam for Windows, macOS, and Linux, followed by a version for Nintendo Switch on April 14, 2021. The launch amid the COVID-19 pandemic caused audience reactions that surprised Pyta, and he thought that the pandemic allowed the player to better connect with the Shade. Ports for Android and iOS were released on December 18, 2023.

== Reception ==
Reception

Aggregate scores
Aggregator	Score
Metacritic	79/100
OpenCritic	74% recommend

Review scores
Publication	Score
4Players	70%
Nintendo Life	5/10
Nintendo World Report	9/10
Pocket Gamer	5/5
PC Gamer (Sweden)	82%

Reception of the game was largely positive. On the review aggregator website Metacritic, the PC and Switch versions received generally favorable reviews. OpenCritic assessed that the game was recommended by 74% of reviewers. Some critics praised The Longing's experimental premise. Adventure Gamers recommended it to players who liked unusual gameplay, or enjoyed video games as an art form. PC Gamer in Swedish called it a "fascinating experiment" with plenty of atmosphere. The Washington Post said that it demonstrated the potential of what video games could do.

The slow-paced gameplay divided reviewers. The Washington Post praised the slowness for allowing the player's mind to wander, comparing it to the works of filmmaker Béla Tarr. Similarly, Hardcore Gamer said that the appeal of the Shade helped pass the time, and eased the player into the pacing naturally. On the other hand, many critics thought that players would become impatient while playing, and the sedate pacing would not be for everyone. Nintendo Life shared this opinion, and although the reviewer liked its reflection on loneliness, he criticized the wait times as tedious. Other critics enjoyed caring for the Shade, and positively compared the protagonist to the Tamagotchi virtual pet.

The Longing's artistic direction was subject to significant commentary. Journalists variously described the game's atmosphere as "gloomy", "lonely" and "eerie". The visuals were highlighted as a strength. Nintendo World Report felt that the caves were well-drawn and distinct. 4Players and Der Spiegel compared the art to that of German cartoonist Walter Moers. In a more critical review, Nintendo Life commended the art and sounds for their boldness, but found the atmosphere to be dull and uninteresting. The soundtrack also received praise from critics. Adventure Gamers appreciated the music for representing a medley of emotions, feeling that the songs expressed the Shade's small size in such a large subterranean kingdom. The Games Machine similarly felt that the sound effectively blended the movement of the Shade with the overall atmosphere.

Due to the release during the COVID-19 pandemic, commentators frequently compared the game experience to life under quarantine. GamesRadar+ likened The Longing to experiencing a COVID-19 lockdown, saying it "best sums up life in the 2020 pandemic". Adventure Gamers suggested that the game's release during the lockdown made the theme of loneliness more relevant, thus enhancing the game's appeal. Wired wrote that the Shade felt alive in a magical way, and that The Longing captured "2020's sad and surreal lockdown energy". The reviewer also felt that the game acted as a refuge from the attention economy that commercial games orient themselves around.

The Longing won the "Best Debut" award at the 2020 Deutscher Computerspielpreis and was a finalist for the Nuovo Award at the 2020 Independent Games Festival.
