= Barbarossa Cave =

Cave in Thuringia, Germany

- Barbarossahöhle
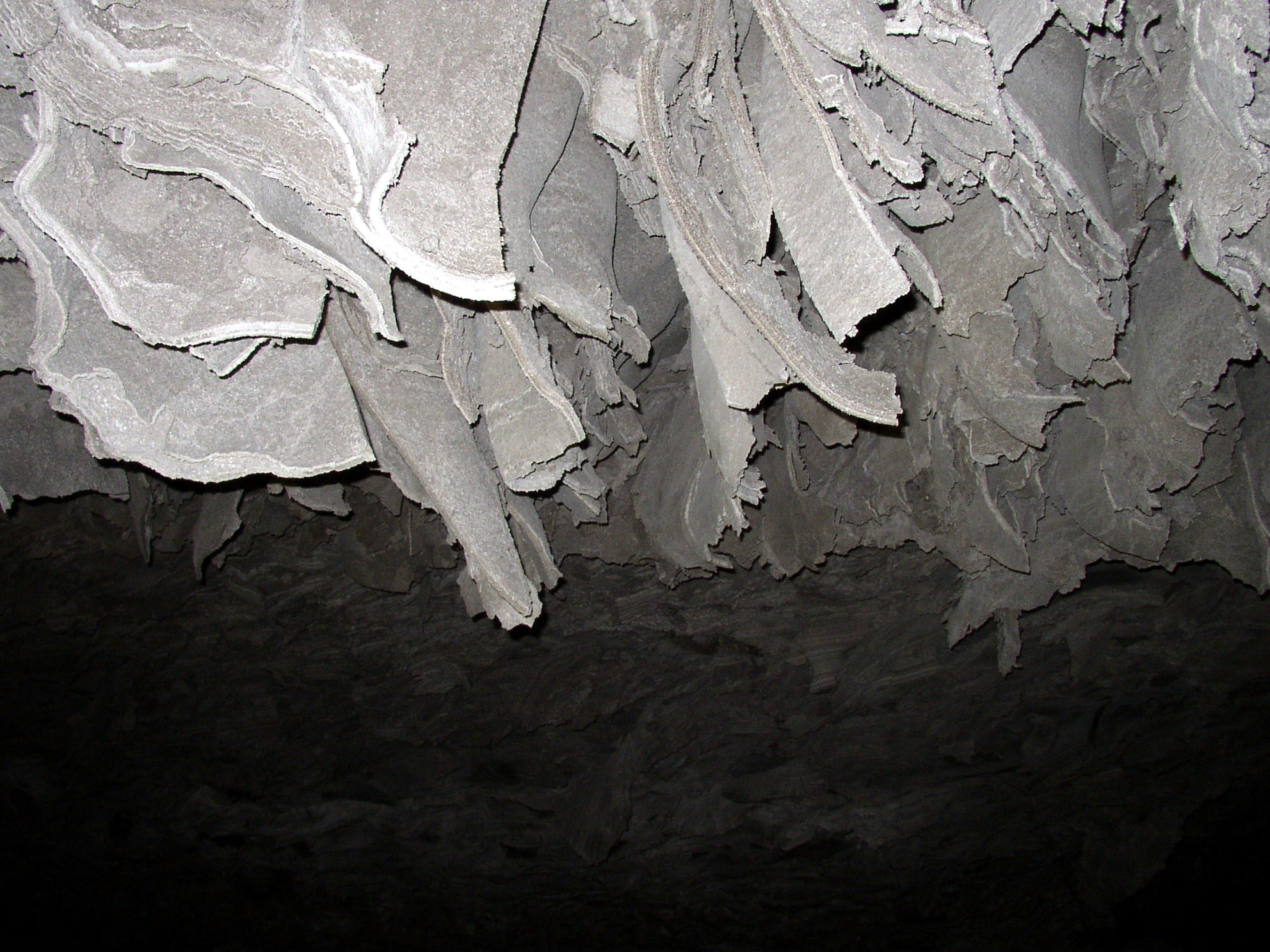
- Flakes of gypsum in the Barbarossa Cave (2005)
- Interactive map of Barbarossa Cave
- Location: Kyffhäuser, Germany
- Coordinates: 51°22′32″N 11°02′11″E
- Length: 1,100 m (1,200 yd)
- Discovery: 1865
- Geology: Anhydrite (Werra Formation) endogenous stratigraphic boundary cave (Schlotte Wimmelburger Type)
- Show cave opened: 1866
- Show cave length: 600 m (660 yd)
- Lighting: electric (since 1895)
- Visitors: 70,000 (2011)
- Features: Gipslappen; Alabasteraugen; Schlangengips
- Website: www.barbarossahoehle.de

The Barbarossa Cave (German: Barbarossahöhle) is an anhydrite cave (gypsum cave) in the Kyffhäuser Hills near Rottleben in the east German state of Thuringia. It is a cave with large caverns, grottos and lakes. The anhydrite has formed gypsum on the surface due to the air moisture in the cave and, as a result, has increased in volume. The resulting layers of gypsum gradually separate from the underlying rock and hang like wallpaper from the walls and ceilings of the caverns.

The cave was discovered in 1865 as a gallery was being driven during prospecting work for kupferschiefer, a copper-bearing shale or bituminous marl. By 1866, it had been developed and opened as a show cave under the name of Falkenburg Cave (Falkenburger Höhle). It has a floor area of about 25,000 m^{2} (269,100 sq ft). Of interest to visitors are the underground lakes whose gypsum content gives them an iridescent green colour, and a human made stone construction, known as Barbarossa's Table and Chair (Tisch und Stuhl von Barbarossa).

Its location in the Kyffhäuser Hills gave rise to its link with the Barbarossa Legend and its proximity to the Kyffhäuser Monument led to it being renamed the Barbarossa Cave (Barbarossahöhle) at the end of the 19th century. According to the legend, Emperor Frederick Barbarossa would sleep in an underground palace until Germany is unified. His beard is growing around a round table. To date, it has gone around the table twice, but when it has encircled the table a third time, the end of the world will begin or Barbarossa will awaken and begin his reign anew. According to the legend, until then, there will be no other good emperors.

The Barbarossa Cave lies on the Karst Trail.

== See also ==
- List of show caves in Germany

== Literature ==
- Behm-Blancke, Günter (2005). Höhlen, Heiligtümer, Kannibalen ein archäologischer Tatsachenbericht (in German). Querfurt. ISBN 978-3-928498-86-9. OCLC 1281539824.
