= Castle well =

Water well built to supply drinking water to a castle

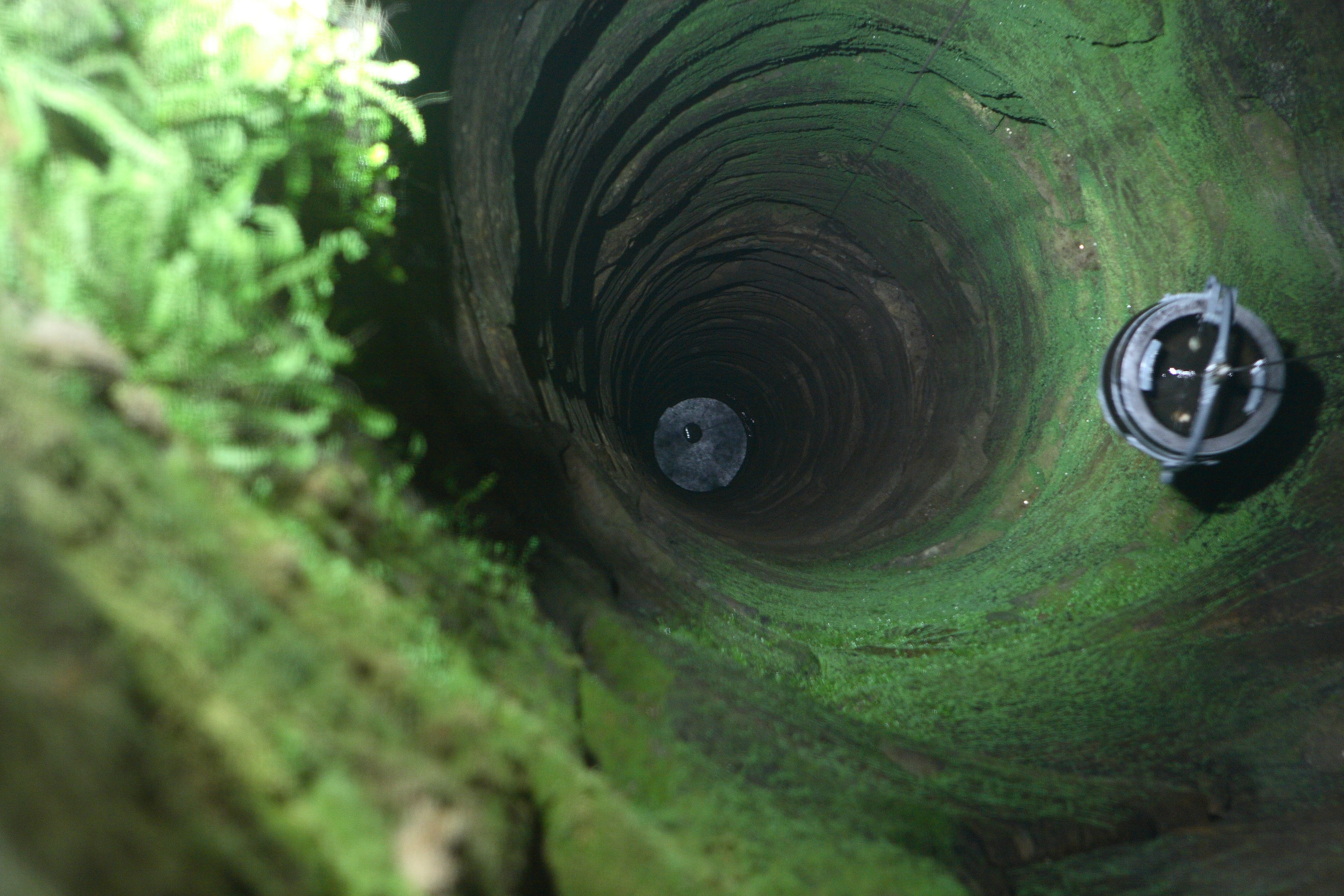
The well at Königstein Fortress

A castle well was a water well built to supply drinking water to a castle. It was often the most costly and time-consuming element in the building of a castle, and its construction time could span decades.

The well – as well as any available cisterns – provided a protected source of drinking water for the castle garrison in peace and war and also for any civil population seeking refuge during a siege. In medieval times, external wells were frequently poisoned, usually with a decomposing body, in order to force a garrison to surrender. But wells sunk within the castle itself could not be poisoned from outside during a siege.

== Construction ==
Wells often had to be sunk a considerable depth in order to tap the nearest geological stratum holding sufficient water, the actual depth depending on the height of the castle and level of the groundwater. This was particularly challenging in the construction of hill castles. In addition, there was also the problem of providing sufficient oxygen for well diggers as they dug the well out of the rock by hand.

In order to supply fresh air to the well diggers during construction, a dividing wall, usually of wood, was built into the well shaft, any gaps being stuffed with straw and pitch to make it as airtight as possible. Over the projecting "chimney" so formed, a fireplace was built that sucked air through the well shaft below. Fresh air (and hence oxygen) circulated through the artificially built U-shaped pipe so created, its two halves being separated by the dividing wall. This supplied fresh air at the "bend" which provided the diggers with sufficient oxygen.

== Notable examples ==
Many of the deepest castle wells in the world are in Germany. They include those at Kyffhausen Castle (176 metres (577 ft)), Königstein Fortress (152 metres) and the Hohenburg in Homberg (150 metres). In addition there is the well at Stolpen Castle (82 metres) which is the deepest well driven into basalt in the world. According to historic sources there was once a castle well over 197 metres deep at Regenstein Castle near Blankenburg in the Harz Mountains. This was, however, filled in long ago. The well located in Zbiroh castle (now château) in the Czech Republic is 163 metres deep. By comparison, the deepest castle well in England is at Beeston Castle (113 metres).

== Literature ==
- Axel W. Gleue: Wie kam das Wasser auf die Burg - Vom Brunnenbau auf Höhenburgen und Bergvesten. 1st edn., Verlag Schnell und Steiner, Regensburg, 2008, ISBN 978-3-7954-2085-7.
