= Göllingen =

- Ortsteil of Kyffhäuserland
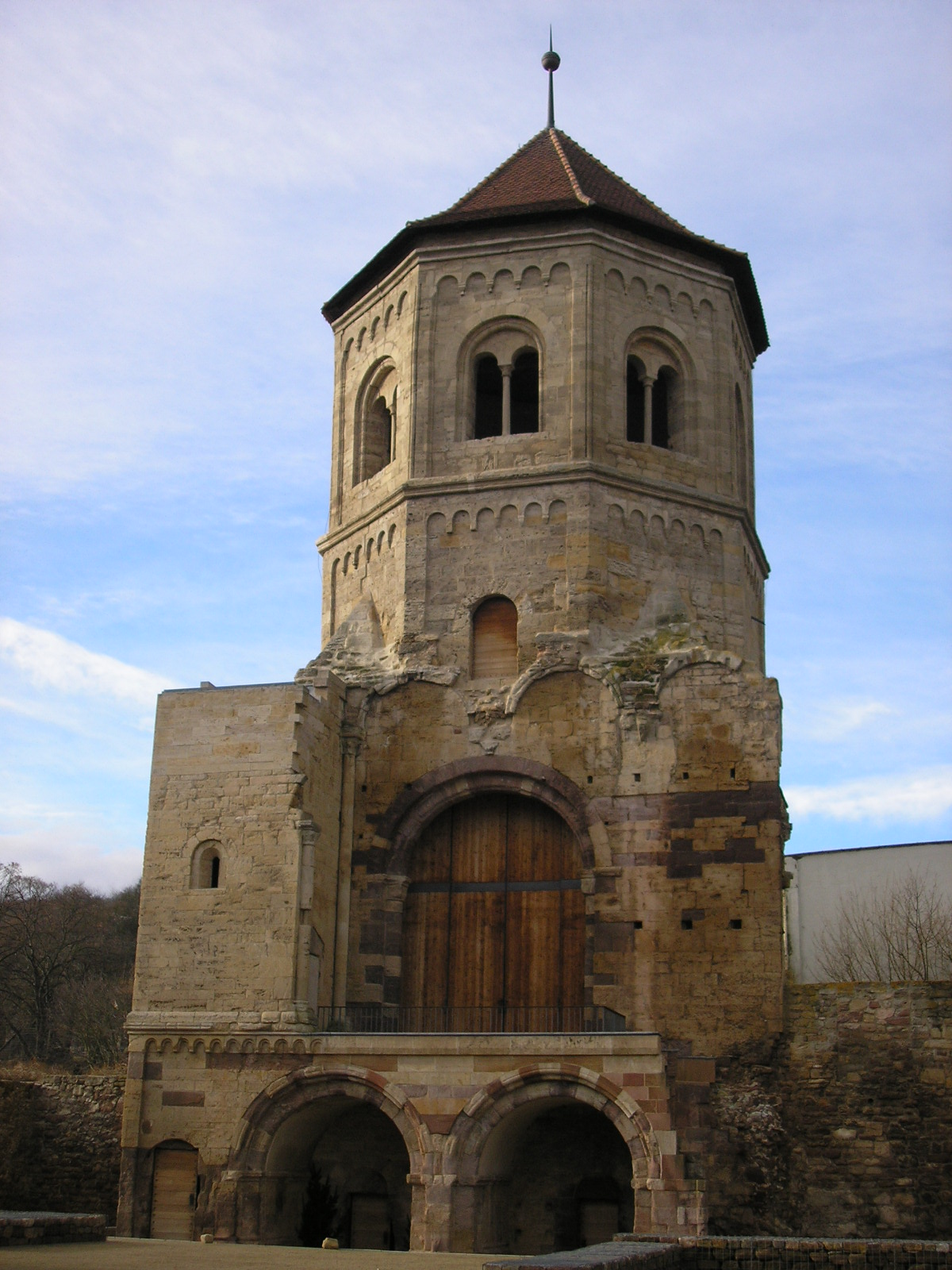
- Kloster Göllingen, a former monastery in Göllingen
- Interactive map of Göllingen
- Location within Germany Location within Thuringia
- Coordinates: 51°20′38″N 11°0′49″E
- Country: Germany
- State: Thuringia
- District: Kyffhäuserkreis
- Municipality: Kyffhäuserland

Area
  - Total: 10.74 km^{2} (4.15 sq mi)
- Elevation: 170 m (560 ft)

Population (2011-12-31)
  - Total: 709
  - Density: 66.0/km^{2} (171/sq mi)
- Time zone: UTC+01:00 (CET)
  - Summer (DST): UTC+02:00 (CEST)
- Postal codes: 06567
- Dialling codes: 03 46 71
- Vehicle registration: KYF

Göllingen (German pronunciation: [ˈɡœlɪŋən]) is a village and a former municipality in the district Kyffhäuserkreis, in Thuringia, Germany. Since 31 December 2012, it is part of the municipality Kyffhäuserland.
