= Günserode =

- Ortsteil of Kyffhäuserland
- Interactive map of Günserode
- Location within Germany Location within Thuringia
- Coordinates: 51°18′28″N 11°2′57″E
- Country: Germany
- State: Thuringia
- District: Kyffhäuserkreis
- Municipality: Kyffhäuserland

Area
  - Total: 8.52 km^{2} (3.29 sq mi)
- Elevation: 180 m (590 ft)

Population (2011-12-31)
  - Total: 161
  - Density: 18.9/km^{2} (48.9/sq mi)
- Time zone: UTC+01:00 (CET)
  - Summer (DST): UTC+02:00 (CEST)
- Postal codes: 06567
- Dialling codes: 034671
- Vehicle registration: KYF

Günserode (German pronunciation: [ɡʏnzəˈʁoːdə]) is a village and a former municipality in the district Kyffhäuserkreis, in Thuringia, Germany. Since 31 December 2012, it is part of the municipality Kyffhäuserland.
