= Hachelbich =

- Ortsteil of Kyffhäuserland
- Coat of arms
- Interactive map of Hachelbich
- Location within Germany Location within Thuringia
- Coordinates: 51°20′39″N 10°57′53″E
- Country: Germany
- State: Thuringia
- District: Kyffhäuserkreis
- Municipality: Kyffhäuserland

Area
  - Total: 23.68 km^{2} (9.14 sq mi)
- Elevation: 190 m (620 ft)

Population (2011-12-31)
  - Total: 599
  - Density: 25.3/km^{2} (65.5/sq mi)
- Time zone: UTC+01:00 (CET)
  - Summer (DST): UTC+02:00 (CEST)
- Postal codes: 99706
- Dialling codes: 03632
- Vehicle registration: KYF

Hachelbich (German pronunciation: [ˈhaxl̩bɪç]) is a small village (probably created as a vicus of a roman castrum) and a former municipality in the district Kyffhäuserkreis, in Thuringia, Germany. Since 31 December 2012, it is part of the municipality Kyffhäuserland.

In the area south of Hachelbich has been recently discovered a Roman marching camp of the first century AD: the Hachelbich Roman castrum. This castrum -discovered in 2009- is the first Roman military camp found in Central Germany (Thuringia) and was deep inside the short-lived Roman province of Germania

== Castrum history ==
The castrum was discovered in 2009. Excavations have taken place in the years 2010 and 2014–2015, demonstrating that it was built by the Romans. The wood discovered in the walls showed a construction period ranging from 50 BC to 125 AD: it was the time when Augustus wanted to annex to his Roman Empire the short-lived province of Germania.

However, some academics (like Jones Brian) believe the castrum was used (or re-used) by emperor Domitian. The most significant military contribution of this emperor was the development of the Limes Germanicus, which encompassed a vast network of roads, forts and watchtowers constructed along the Rhine River to defend the Empire. Around 82 AD, he ordered an attack on the Chatti.

For this purpose, a new legion was founded, Legio I Minervia, which constructed some 75 kilometres (46 mi) of roads through Chatti territory in central Germania to uncover the enemy's hiding places inside Magna Germania. In these years, Domitian should have used the Hachelbich marching camp.

Although little information survives of the battles fought, enough early victories were apparently achieved for Domitian to be back in Rome by the end of 83 AD, where he celebrated an elaborate triumph and conferred upon himself the title of Germanicus.

A pointed trench on the south side is found at 425 m. In the east, a rounded section of the same length follows a round corner. In the northeast is a geophysical prospected entrance with an upstream trench ("Titulum"). Eight ovens with a working pit complete the previously excavated structures. The system continues in the north and west in a similar way, so there it is an irregular square with an enclosed space of at least 18 hectares. Among the still not very numerous finds, there are the non-metallic objects belonging to Roman equipment and four iron shackles.Mario Küßner

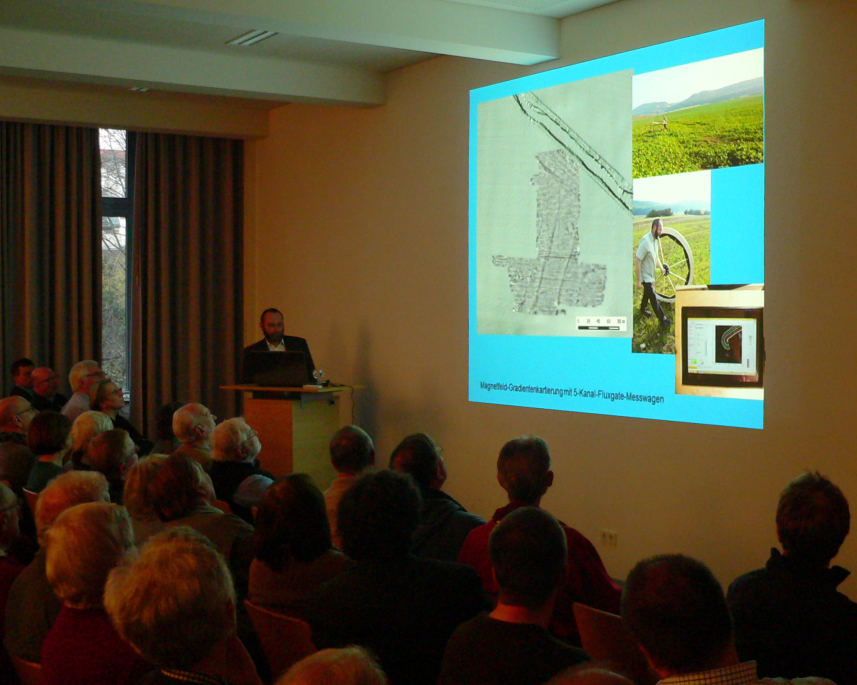
Exposition of 2015 findings in the Hachelbich castrum

In 2016 the archaeologists announced that they estimate the castrum size to be at least 23 hectares and probably 40 hectares.

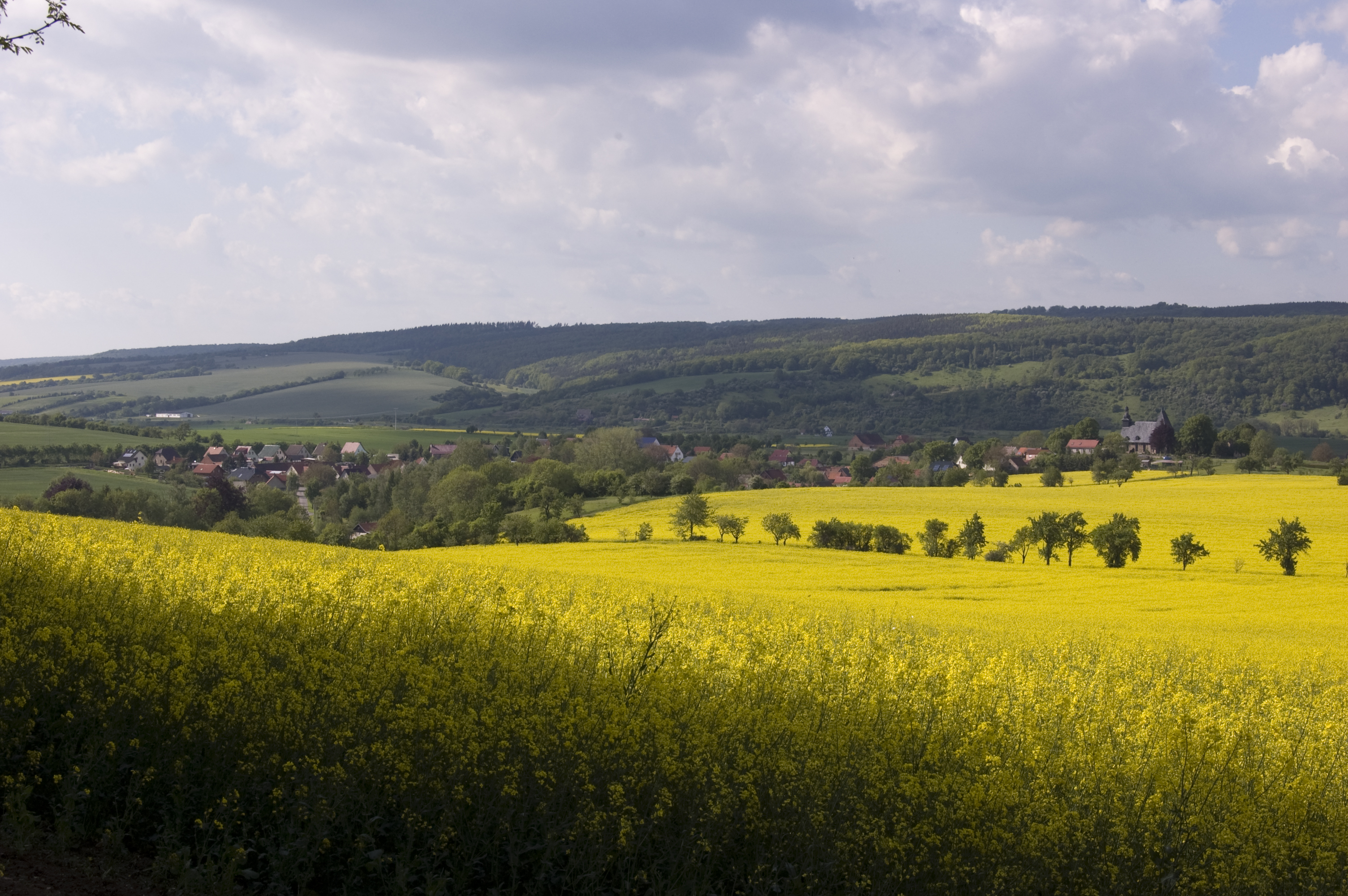
Actual area where was found the Roman camp in Hachelbich

The archaeologists estimate the castrum had the size needed for at least one Roman legion (with about 5,000 legionaries) together with auxiliary troops: a total of about 8,000 to 9,000 men could have used it. Some objects belonging to the legionaries have been found in the excavations.

But they give no precise clue about the legion stationed or what emperor used the castrum: some researchers think that it could have been related to the third century Battle at the Harzhorn. Indeed Maximinus Thrax (the first Roman "soldier-emperor" who reigned briefly from 235 to 238 AD) was personally involved in operations against the Germanic tribes in the recently discovered battle site at Harzhorn and he raided the area around Hachelbich.

== Bibliography ==
- Jones, Brian W. (1992). The Emperor Domitian. London: Routledge ed. ISBN 0-415-10195-6.
- Mario Küßner, Tim Schüler: Truppen in Thüringen. Nordöstlichste römische Militäranlage entdeckt. In: Archäologie in Deutschland 3/2014, S. 6 (online).

== See also ==
- Kyffhäuserland
- Limes Germanicus
- Germania Antiqua
