= Badra, Germany =

Badra
- Ortsteil of Kyffhäuserland
- Interactive map of Badra
- Location within Germany Location within Thuringia
- Coordinates: 51°24′26″N 10°58′17″E
- Country: Germany
- State: Thuringia
- District: Kyffhäuserkreis
- Municipality: Kyffhäuserland

Area
  - Total: 13.99 km^{2} (5.40 sq mi)
- Elevation: 225 m (738 ft)

Population (2011-12-31)
  - Total: 569
  - Density: 40.7/km^{2} (105/sq mi)
- Time zone: UTC+01:00 (CET)
  - Summer (DST): UTC+02:00 (CEST)
- Postal codes: 99706
- Dialling codes: 03632
- Vehicle registration: KYF

Badra (German pronunciation: [ˈbaːdʁa]) is a village in the municipality Kyffhäuserland in Thuringia, Germany, near its border with Saxony-Anhalt. It is located between the Windleite and Kyffhäuser Mountains. Until 31 December 2012, it was part of the district Kyffhäuserkreis.
