= Tilleda =

- Stadtteil of Kelbra
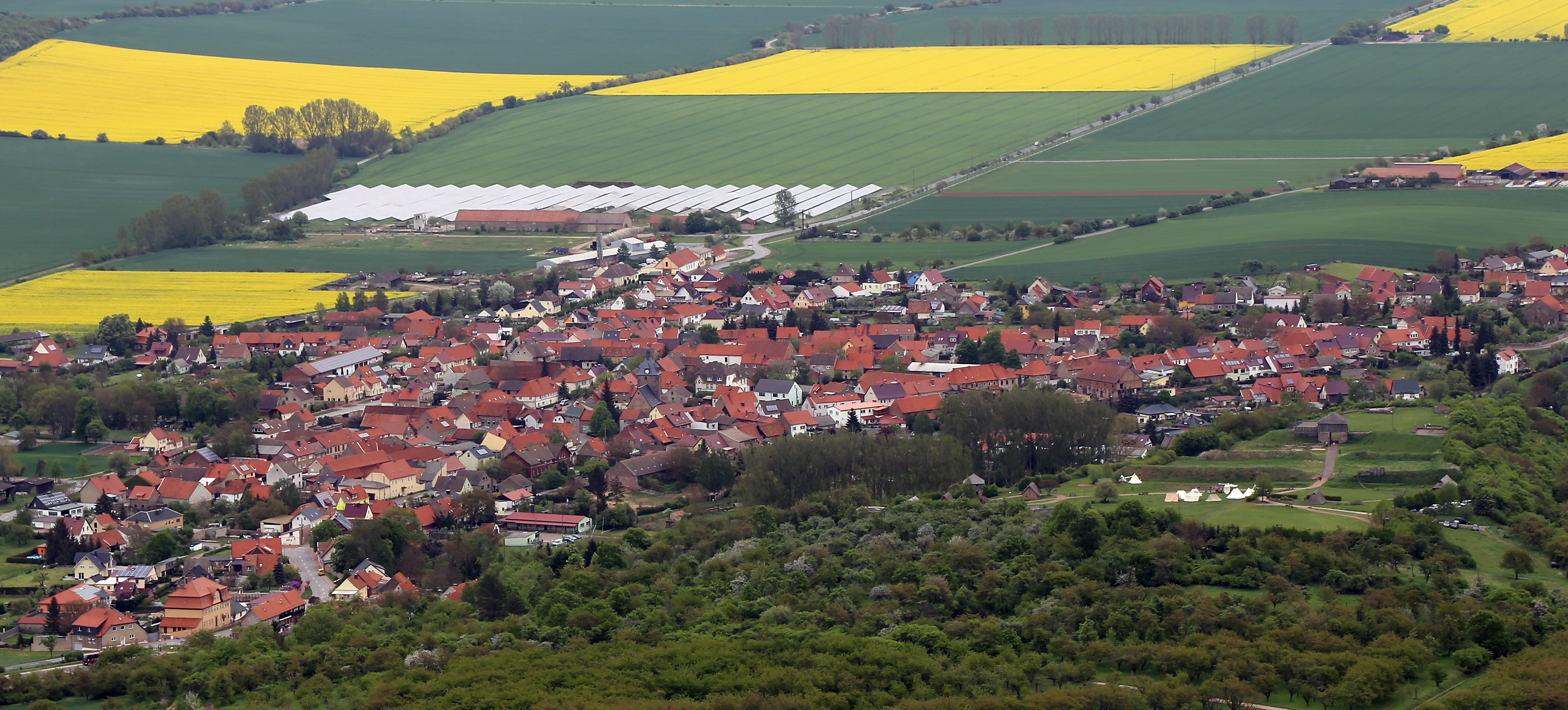
- Tilleda viewed from Kyffhäuser
- Interactive map of Tilleda
- Location within Germany Location within Saxony-Anhalt
- Coordinates: 51°25′14″N 11°8′36″E
- Country: Germany
- State: Saxony-Anhalt
- District: Mansfeld-Südharz
- Town: Kelbra

Area
  - Total: 14.7 km^{2} (5.7 sq mi)
- Elevation: 169 m (554 ft)

Population (2006-12-31)
  - Total: 918
  - Density: 62.4/km^{2} (162/sq mi)
- Time zone: UTC+01:00 (CET)
  - Summer (DST): UTC+02:00 (CEST)
- Postal codes: 06537
- Dialling codes: 034651
- Vehicle registration: MSH
- Website: www.vwg-goldene-aue.de

Tilleda is a village and a former municipality in the Mansfeld-Südharz district, in the German state of Saxony-Anhalt. Since 1 July 2009, it has been part of the town Kelbra. Tilleda is located at the northern rim of the Kyffhäuser mountain range with the Kyffhäuser Monument, located in neighbouring Thuringia. The population is about 900.

Tilleda is notable mainly for having been the site of a medieval Royal palace or Pfalz which has been partially excavated and reconstructed.

== History ==
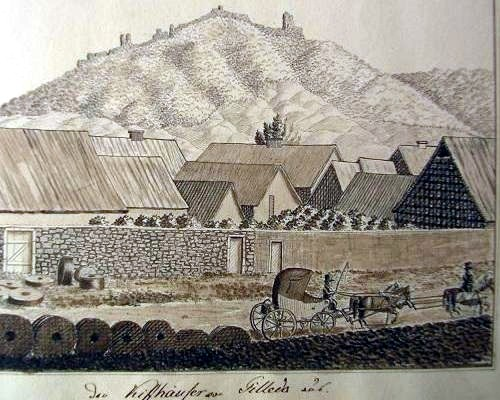
Tilleda / Kyffhäuser, ca. 1820

In around 700 a small settlement was founded on the Pfingstberg. The settlement was first mentioned in the early 9th century as Dullide, an estate of Hersfeld Abbey.

The 972 marriage certificate of Emperor Otto II denotes a Kaiserpfalz (imperial palace) at Tilleda. Otto gave the Pfalz as a gift to his bride, Theophanu. Between that year and 1042, the palace was used on and off by the German kings and emperors. However, the period between 1042 and 1174, during which Emperor Frederick I "Barbarossa" stayed there, it is not mentioned in documents at all. In 1194, his son, Henry VI made peace with his former enemy Heinrich der Löwe (Henry the Lion) at Tilleda. This is the last time a king is documented to have been there. By the first half of the 13th century, Tilleda is now assumed not to have served as a Pfalzany more.

The area was then ruled by the Counts of the House of Beichlingen, and a knight from their retinue, called "Bart von Tilleda", lived at Tilleda, holding it as a fief from the Emperor. In 1420, the House of Witzleben was awarded the fief. Around 30 years later, the property was referred to as a common fief held by the House of Stolberg and the House of Schwarzburg.

With the castle gradually falling into ruin, it was forgotten until the 19th century, when it was "discovered" by local historian Karl Meyer. Excavations were conducted in 1935–39 and 1958–79. From 1983 the area was made accessible to the public as an open-air museum, which reopened in its current form in 2001. Some parts of the castle have been reconstructed.

== Sights of Interest ==
- Tilleda Palace, an Ottonian royal settlement, where archeological excavations by Paul Grimm revealed several settlements with an outer bailey occupied by craftsmen. Some of the excavated buildings have been reconstructed for the open-air museum.
- Church of the Saviour (Evangelical church), Romanesque-Gothic village church with partly Baroque features and Renaissance-epitaphs. There is a group of small houses forming a circle around the church which enclose a church garden.
- Kyffhäuser Monument, above Tilleda in the Thuringian part of the Kyffhäuser mountains.
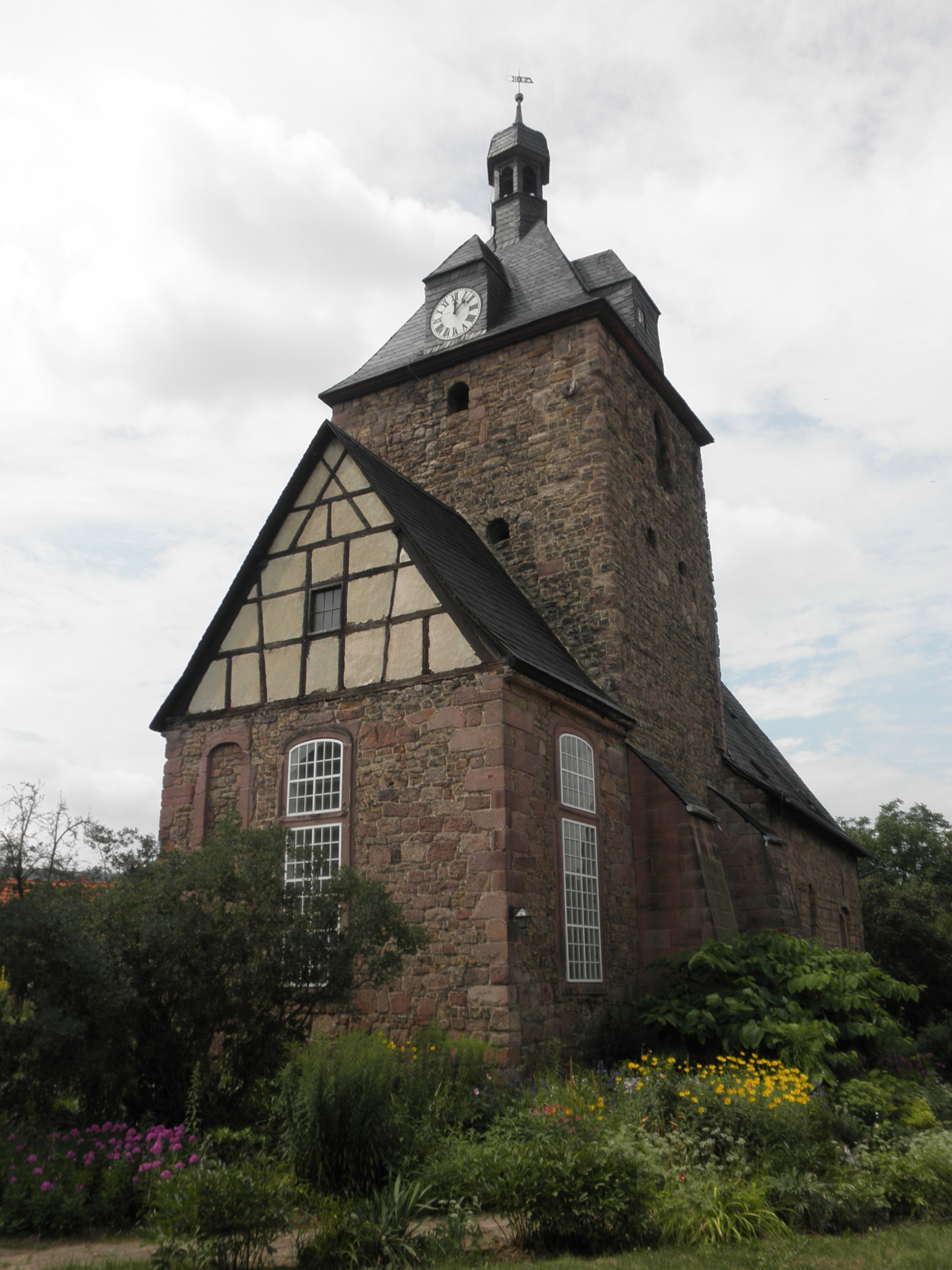
Church of the Saviour in Tilleda

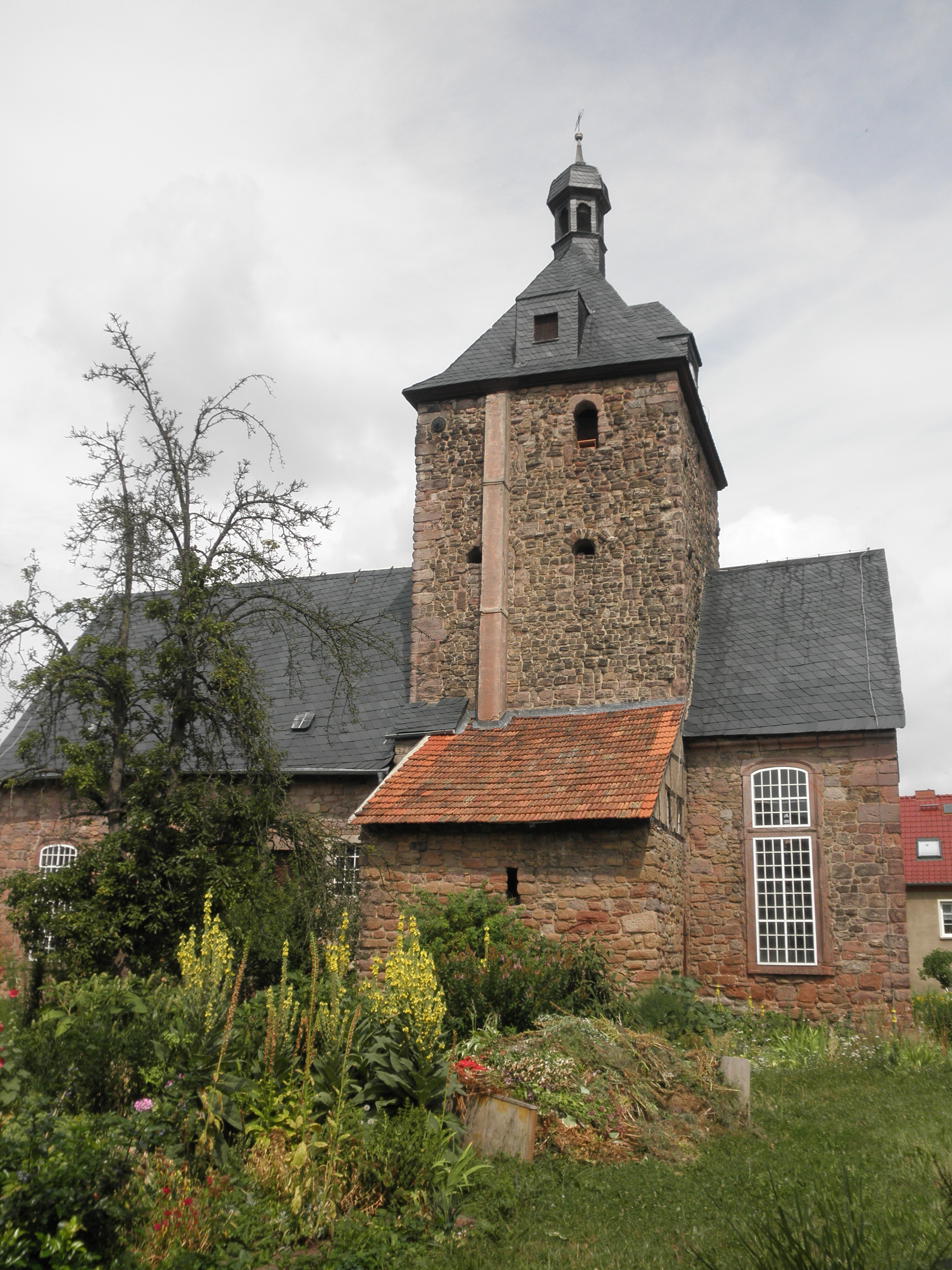
Church of the Saviour in Tilleda

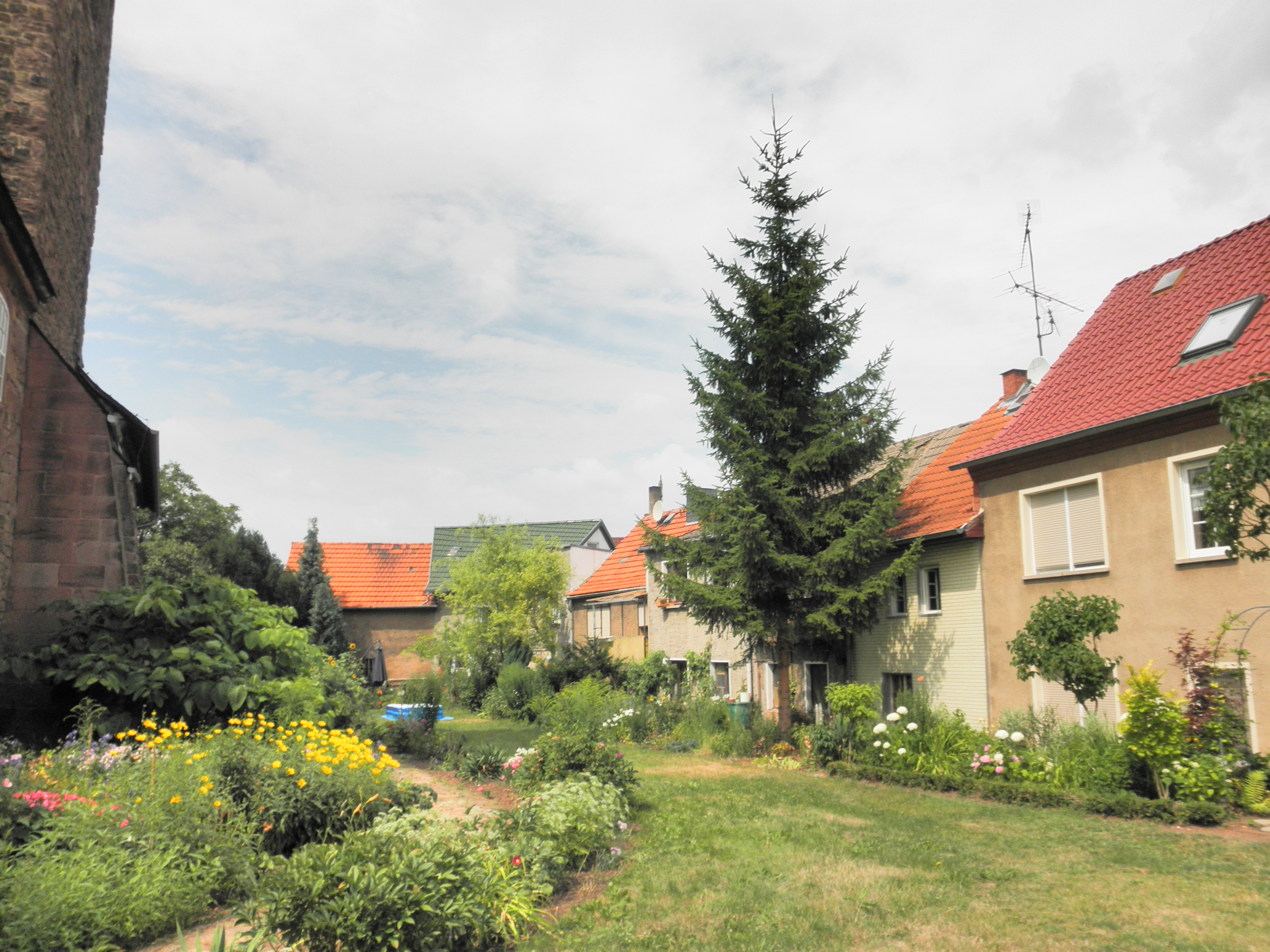
Houses near the church in Tilleda

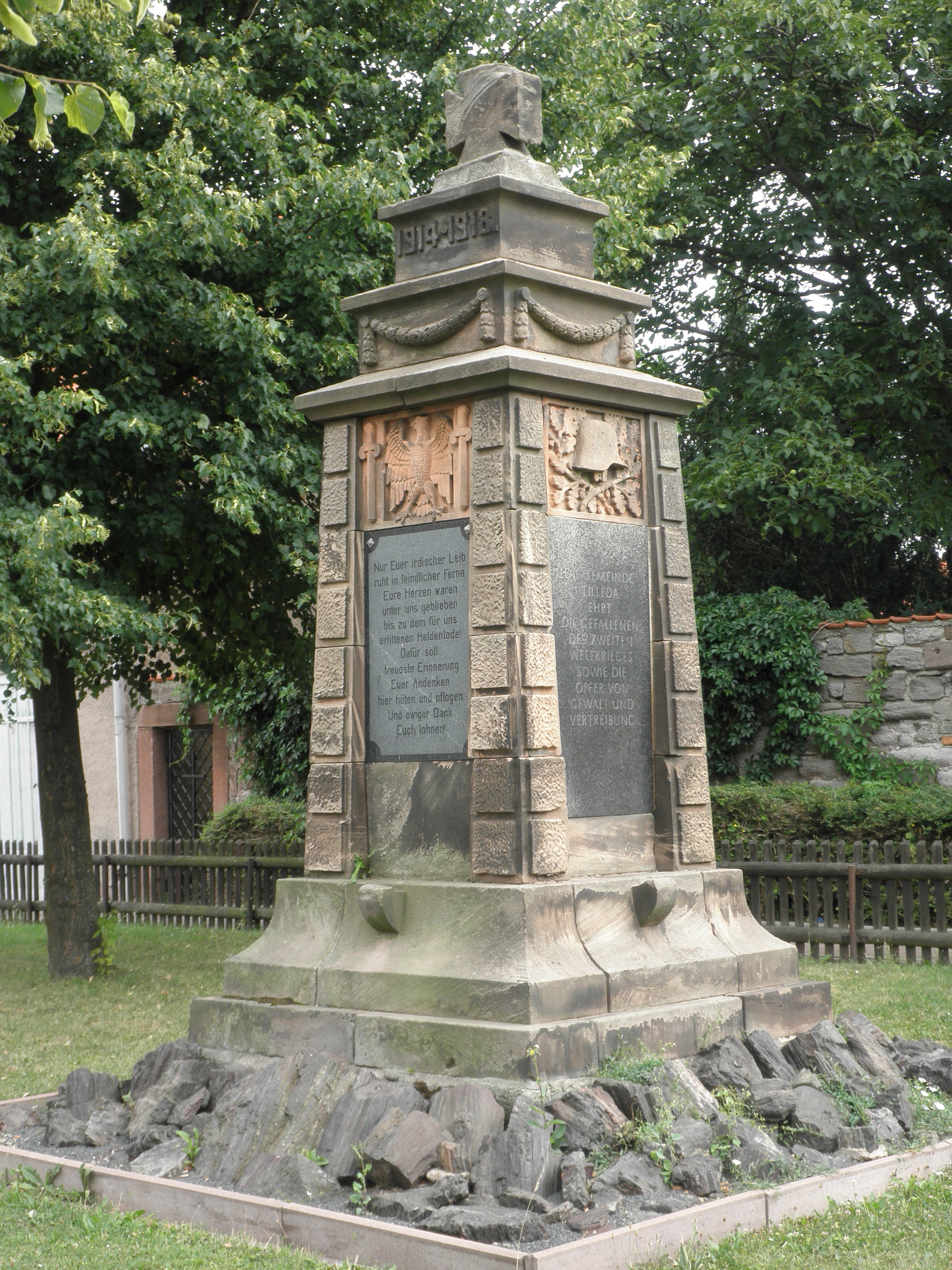
War Memorial in Tilleda

Tilleda is a stop on the tourist route Romanesque Road.
