= Bendeleben =

- Ortsteil of Kyffhäuserland
- Interactive map of Bendeleben
- Location within Germany Location within Thuringia
- Coordinates: 51°22′21″N 11°0′23″E
- Country: Germany
- State: Thuringia
- District: Kyffhäuserkreis
- Municipality: Kyffhäuserland

Area
  - Total: 22.42 km^{2} (8.66 sq mi)
- Elevation: 160 m (520 ft)

Population (2011-12-31)
  - Total: 688
  - Density: 30.7/km^{2} (79.5/sq mi)
- Time zone: UTC+01:00 (CET)
  - Summer (DST): UTC+02:00 (CEST)
- Postal codes: 99706
- Dialling codes: 034671
- Vehicle registration: KYF

Bendeleben (German pronunciation: [ˈbɛndəˌleːbn̩]) is a village in the municipality of Kyffhäuserland, in the Kyffhäuserkreis district of Thuringia, Germany. It lies near the centre of the municipality in a valley basin. The village was first documented in 870, in connection with a donation to Fulda Abbey. Bendeleben contains several historic structures from the baroque period, including a former manor estate, the so-called Neues Schloss, landscaped gardens with an orangerie, and a 21-hectare park complex.

== Historical Population ==
(as of 31 December):

- 1994: 825
- 1995: 797
- 1996: 811
- 1997: 809
- 1998: 811
- 1999: 792
- 2000: 811
- 2001: 804
- 2002: 795
- 2003: 776
- 2004: 772
- 2005: 747
- 2006: 741
- 2007: 726
- 2008: 711
- 2009: 694
- 2010: 698
- 2011: 681

Source: Thuringian State Statistics Office

== Gallery ==
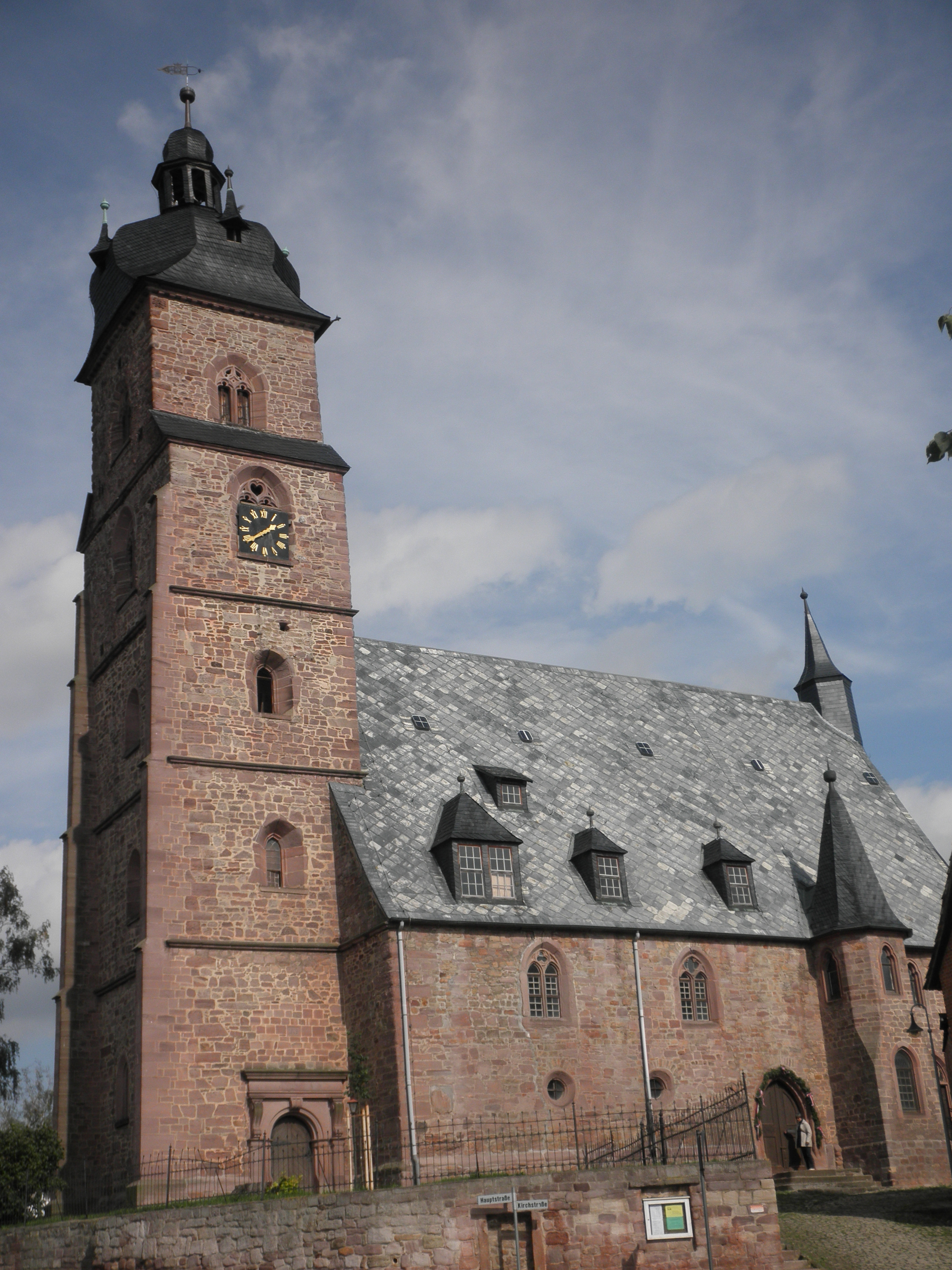
St. Pancras's Church in Bendeleben

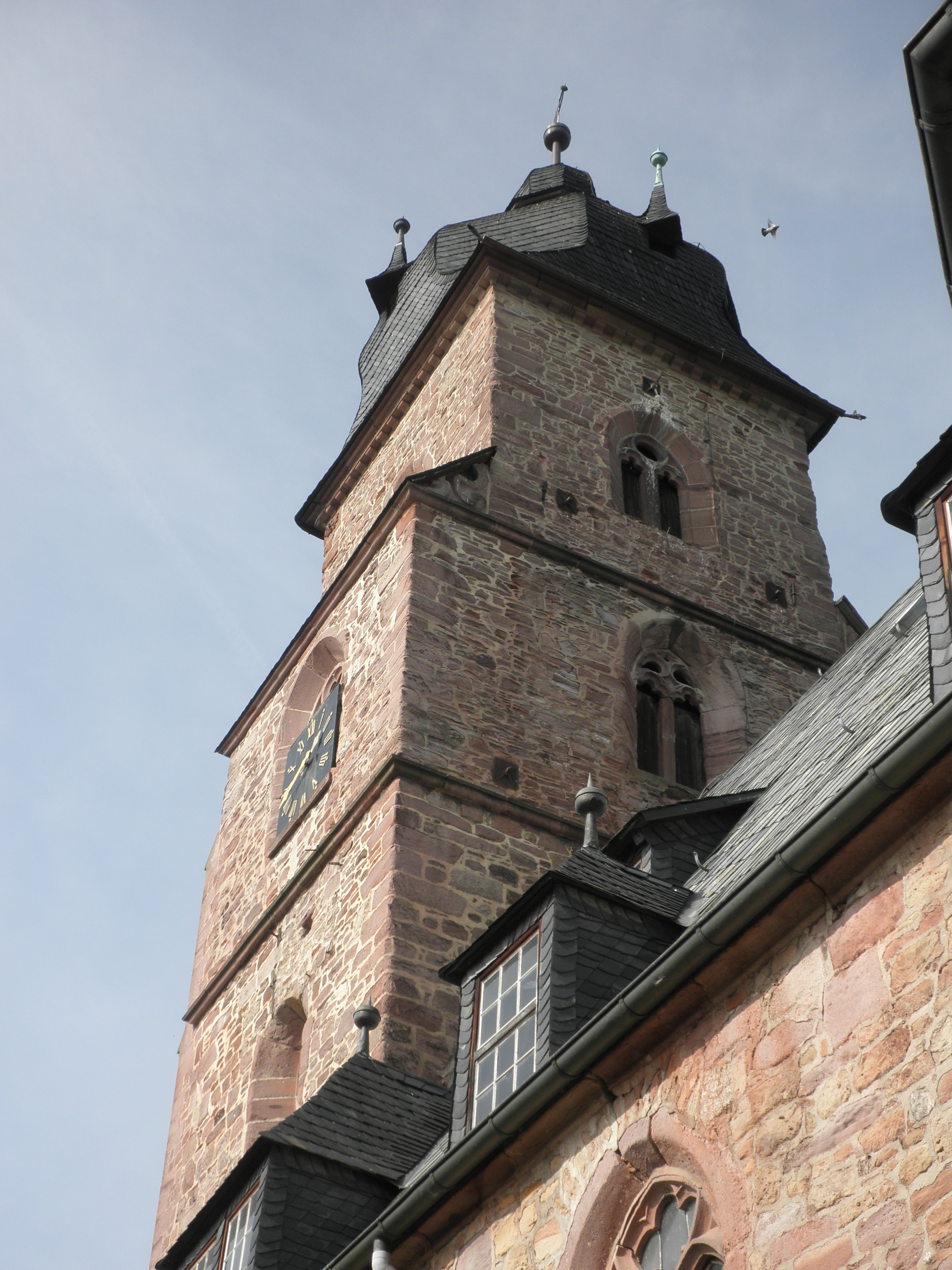
Church Tower in Bendeleben

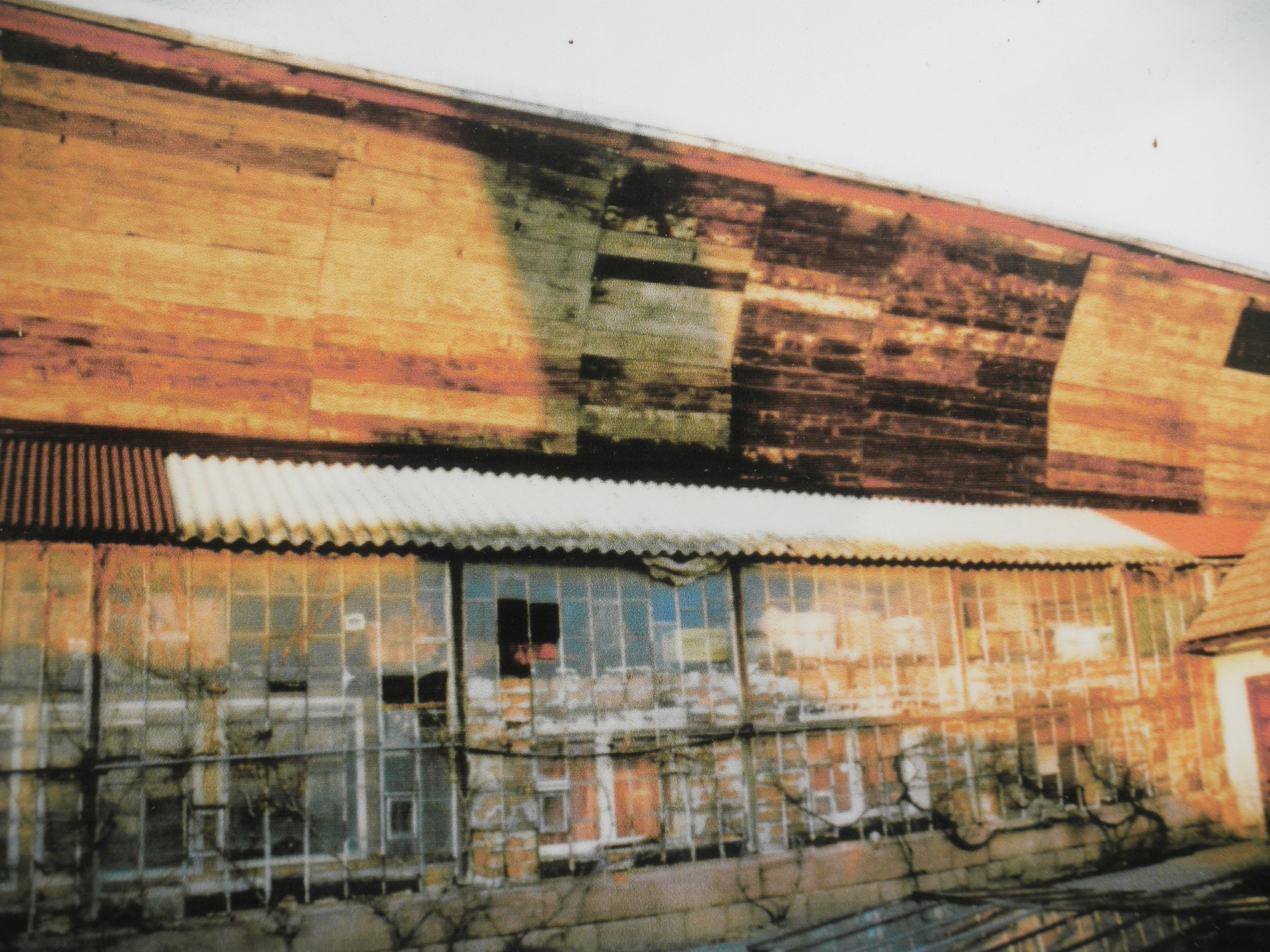
Glasshouse Orangerie 1999

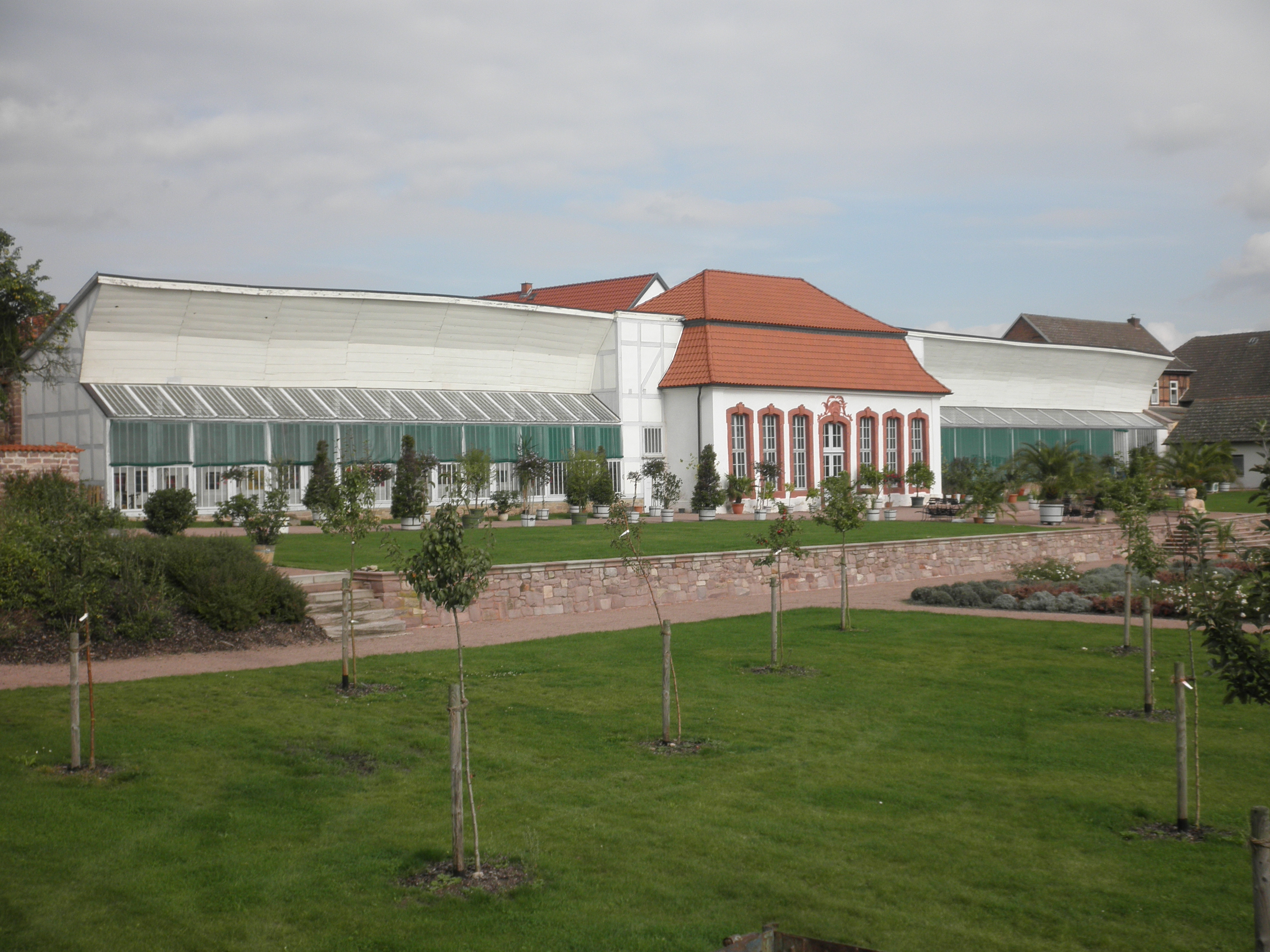
Orangery with Glasshouses 2010

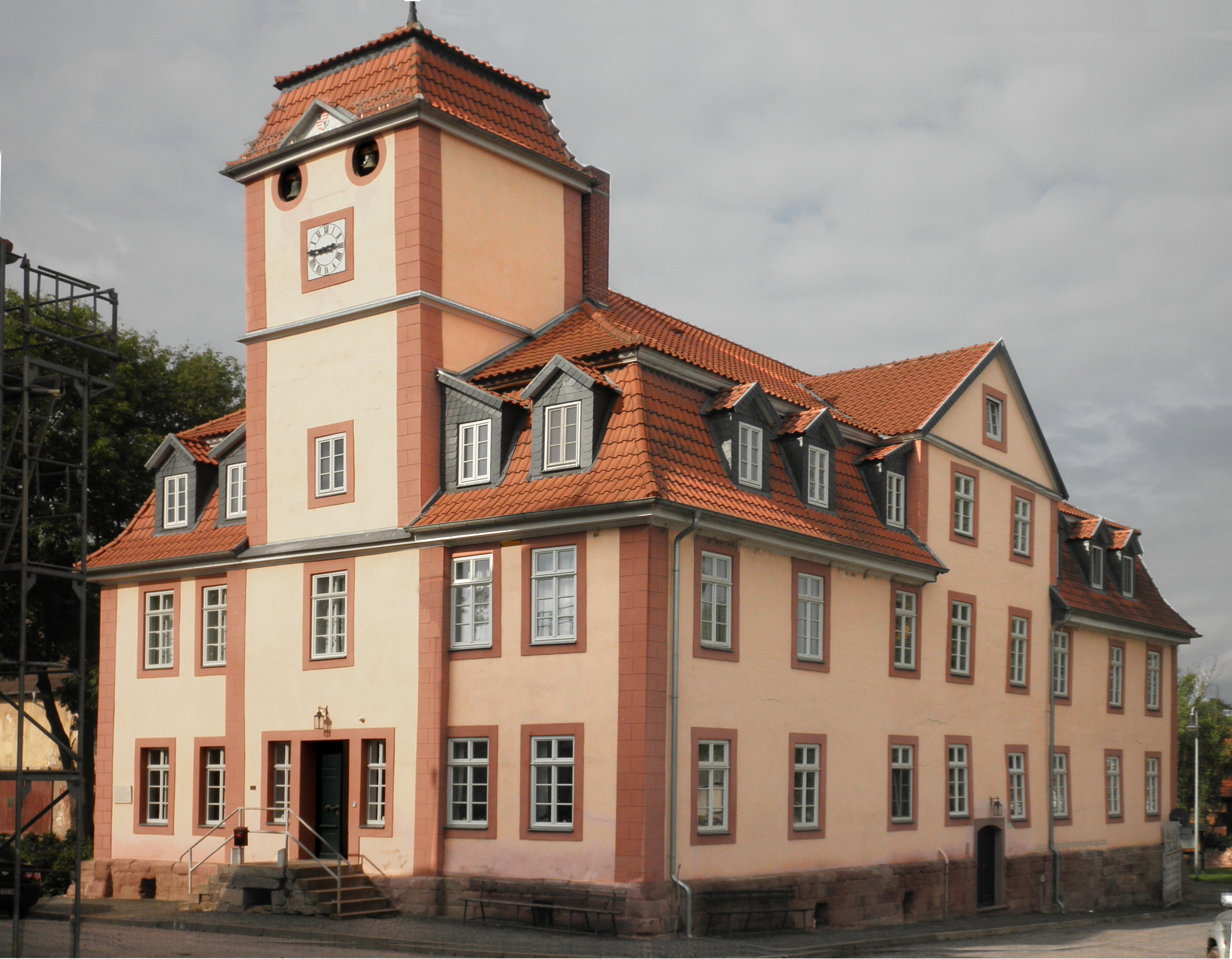
Uckermannsches Manor House in Bendeleben

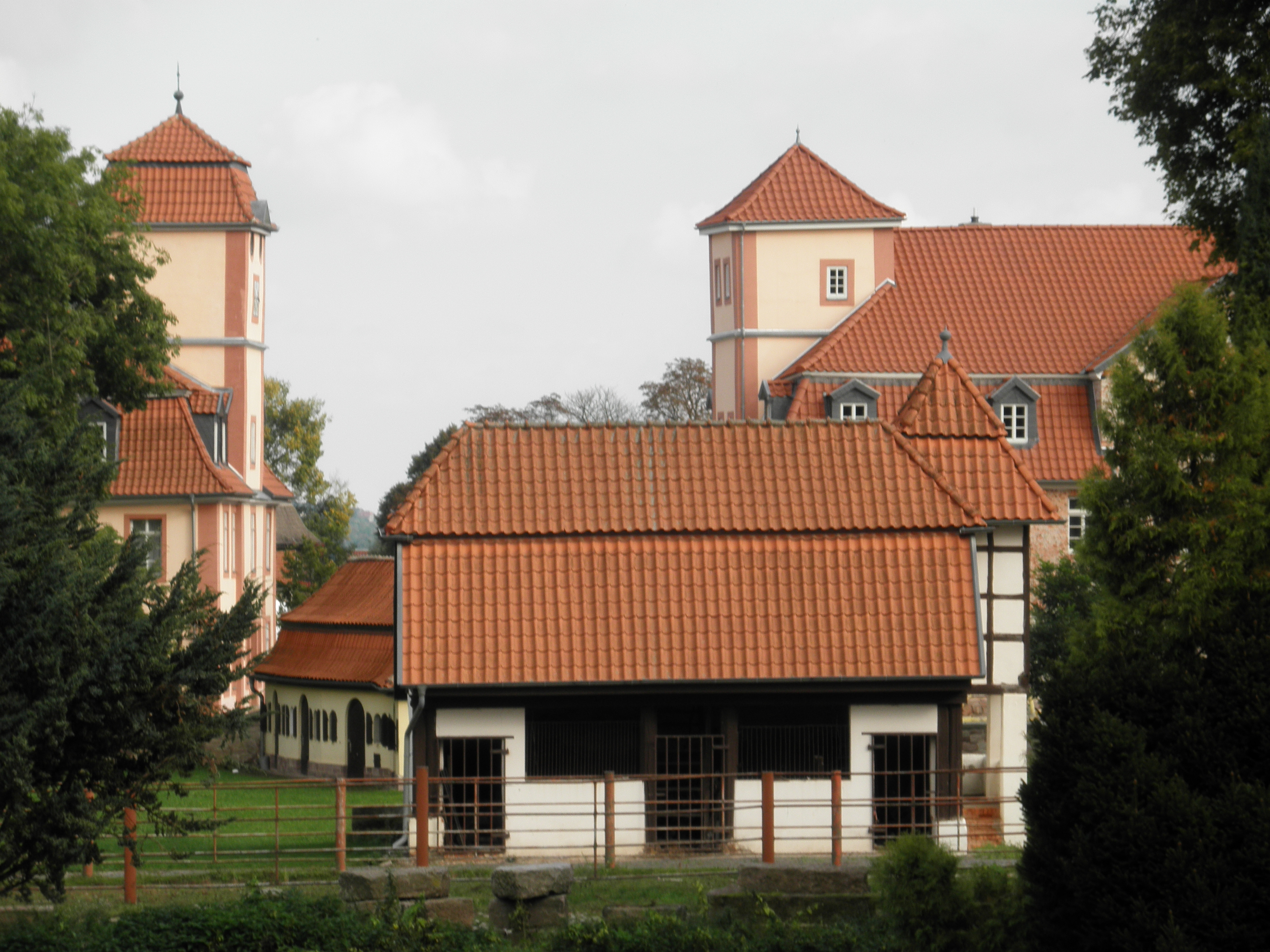
Uckermannsches Manor House, with stables in front

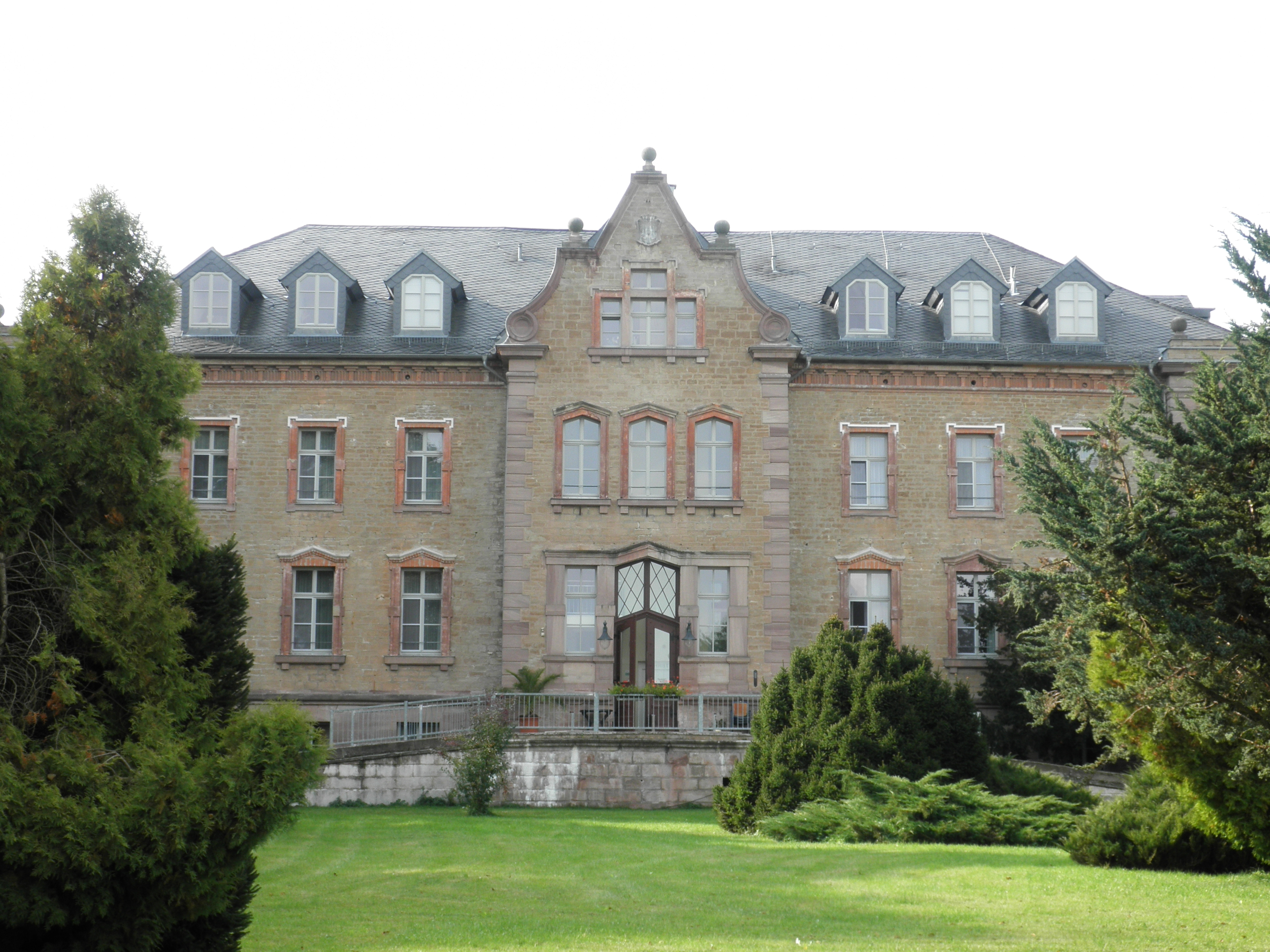
New Manor House in Bendeleben

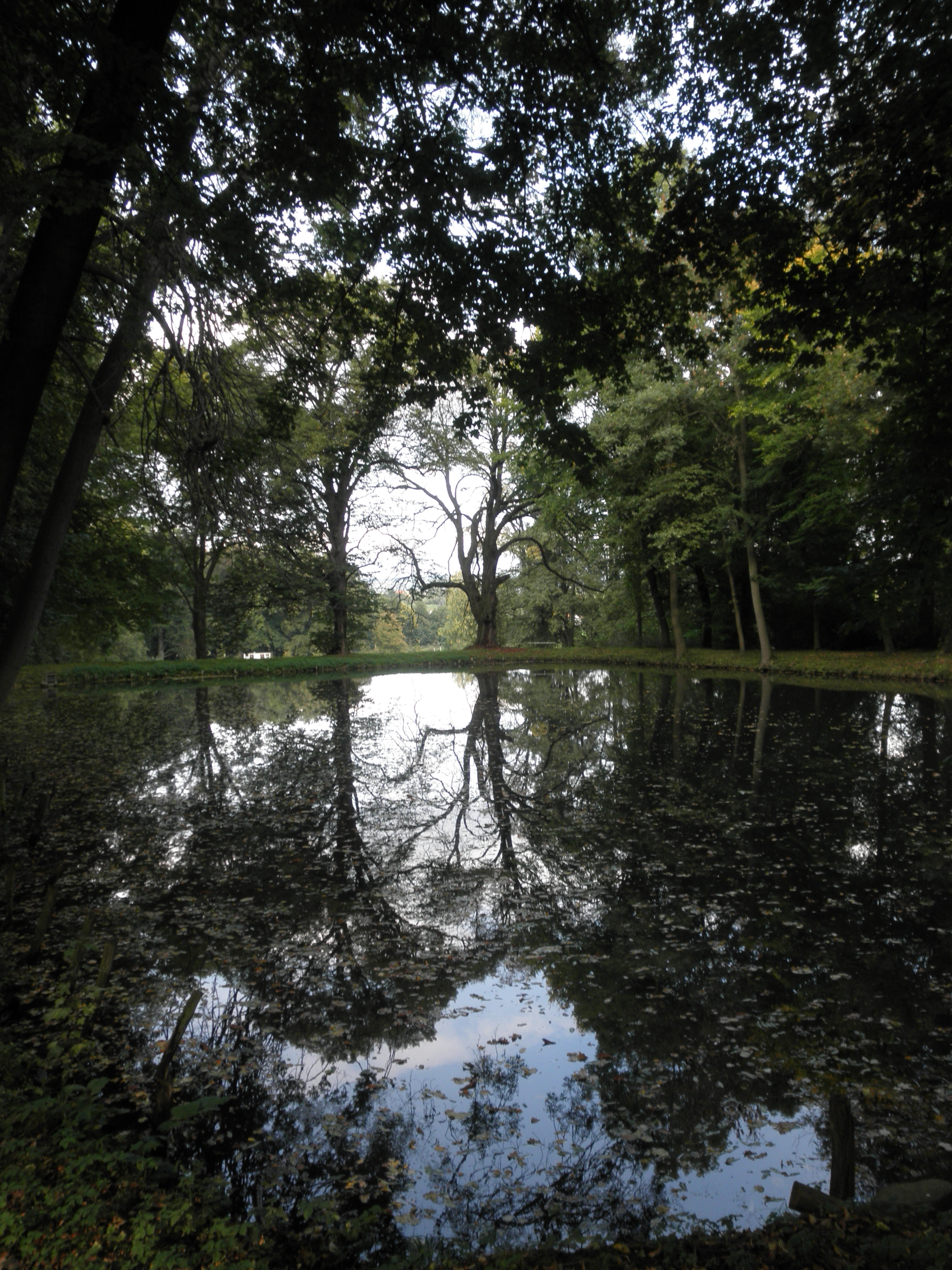
Fish Pond in the Castle Park Bendeleben
