= Kyffhäuserland =

- Municipality
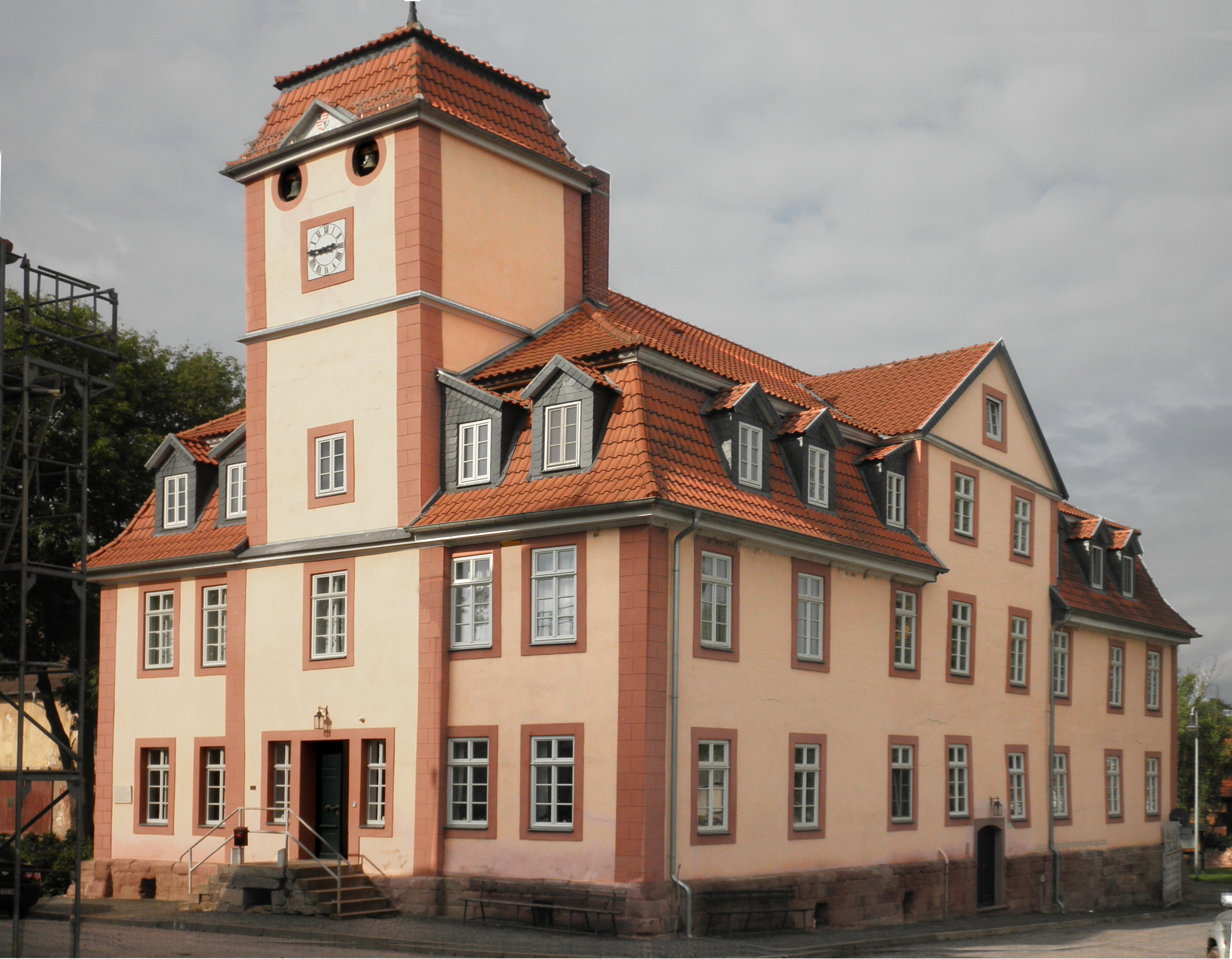
- Manor house in Bendeleben

- Coat of arms

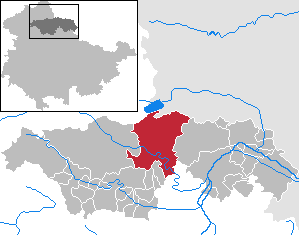
- Location of Kyffhäuserland within Kyffhäuserkreis district
- Interactive map of Kyffhäuserland
- Location within Germany Location within Thuringia
- Coordinates: 51°22′N 11°0′E
- Country: Germany
- State: Thuringia
- District: Kyffhäuserkreis

Government
  - Mayor (2019–25): Knut Hoffmann (CDU)

Area
  - Total: 129.01 km^{2} (49.81 sq mi)
- Elevation: 160 m (520 ft)

Population (2025-12-31)
  - Total: 3,810
  - Density: 29.5/km^{2} (76.5/sq mi)
- Time zone: UTC+01:00 (CET)
  - Summer (DST): UTC+02:00 (CEST)
- Postal codes: 99706
- Dialling codes: 034671
- Vehicle registration: KYF
- Website: www.kyffhaeuser-land.de

Kyffhäuserland (German pronunciation: [ˈkɪfhɔʏzɐˌlant]) is a municipality in the district Kyffhäuserkreis, in Thuringia, Germany. It was formed on 31 December 2012 by the merger of the former municipalities Badra, Bendeleben, Göllingen, Günserode, Hachelbich, Rottleben, Seega and Steinthaleben.
