= Seega (Thuringia) =

- Ortsteil of Kyffhäuserland
- Coat of arms
- Interactive map of Seega
- Location within Germany Location within Thuringia
- Coordinates: 51°19′30″N 11°2′8″E
- Country: Germany
- State: Thuringia
- District: Kyffhäuserkreis
- Municipality: Kyffhäuserland

Area
  - Total: 9.01 km^{2} (3.48 sq mi)
- Elevation: 175 m (574 ft)

Population (2011-12-31)
  - Total: 415
  - Density: 46.1/km^{2} (119/sq mi)
- Time zone: UTC+01:00 (CET)
  - Summer (DST): UTC+02:00 (CEST)
- Postal codes: 06567
- Dialling codes: 034671
- Vehicle registration: KYF

Seega (German pronunciation: [ˈzeːɡa]) is a village and a former municipality in the district Kyffhäuserkreis, in Thuringia, Germany. Since 31 December 2012, it is part of the municipality Kyffhäuserland.
