= Rottleben =

- Ortsteil of Kyffhäuserland
- Coat of arms
- Interactive map of Rottleben
- Location within Germany Location within Thuringia
- Coordinates: 51°21′46″N 11°2′42″E
- Country: Germany
- State: Thuringia
- District: Kyffhäuserkreis
- Municipality: Kyffhäuserland

Area
  - Total: 9.15 km^{2} (3.53 sq mi)
- Elevation: 145 m (476 ft)

Population (2011-12-31)
  - Total: 630
  - Density: 69/km^{2} (180/sq mi)
- Time zone: UTC+01:00 (CET)
  - Summer (DST): UTC+02:00 (CEST)
- Postal codes: 06567
- Dialling codes: 034673
- Vehicle registration: KYF

Rottleben (German pronunciation: [ˈʁɔtˌleːbn̩]) is a village and a former municipality in the district Kyffhäuserkreis, in Thuringia, Germany. Since 31 December 2012, it is part of the municipality Kyffhäuserland.
