= Steinthaleben =

- Ortsteil of Kyffhäuserland
- Coat of arms
- Interactive map of Steinthaleben
- Location within Germany Location within Thuringia
- Coordinates: 51°23′41″N 11°1′28″E
- Country: Germany
- State: Thuringia
- District: Kyffhäuserkreis
- Municipality: Kyffhäuserland

Area
  - Total: 30.88 km^{2} (11.92 sq mi)
- Elevation: 170 m (560 ft)

Population (2011-12-31)
  - Total: 481
  - Density: 15.6/km^{2} (40.3/sq mi)
- Time zone: UTC+01:00 (CET)
  - Summer (DST): UTC+02:00 (CEST)
- Postal codes: 06567
- Dialling codes: 034671
- Vehicle registration: KYF

Steinthaleben (German pronunciation: [ˈʃtaɪntaˌleːbn̩]) is a village and a former municipality in the district Kyffhäuserkreis, in Thuringia, Germany. Since 31 December 2012, it is part of the municipality Kyffhäuserland.
