= World Kickboxing Network =

Sport governing body

- Abbreviation: WKN
- Formation: October 1994
- Founders: Stephane Cabrera; Olivier Muller; Billy Murray
- Founded at: Hong Kong
- Region served: Worldwide
- Official language: English
- President: Stephane Cabrera
- Website: www.worldkickboxingnetwork.net

The World Kickboxing Network (WKN) is an international Kickboxing governing body established in 1994.

== History ==
In 1994, the World Kickboxing Network was founded as a subsidiary of (ISKA) to capture new markets. The ISKA's operations were concentrated in the North American market, while WKN was focusing in Europe, Asia & South America. In the 1990s there was strong competition between kickboxing federations. Both organizations split in late 1998 due to minor disagreements. The newly created team was chaired by Stephane Cabrerra, Billy Murray and Olivier Muller.

On September 19, 1998, WKN became the first organization to promote a world championship in Muay Thai on the same event as a boxing world championship. Jérôme Le Banner vs. Espedito Da Silva for the WKN World super heavyweight Muay Thai title was sanctioned on the undercard of Evander Holyfield vs. Vaughn Bean for the WBA and IBF heavyweight titles at Georgia Dome in Atlanta. The event was organized in collaboration with promoter Don King whom raised the hand of Le Banner, crowned new WKN Muay Thai world champion after knocking out Da Silva in the first-round.

On October 22, 2004, WKN made history in kickboxing by promoting the first kickboxing world championship bout in Romania. Samir Mohamed vs. Alexander Kozachenko for the WKN World super lightweight title headlined the Eurosport and Pro TV televised event Local Kombat 10 in the city of Brăila. The local Kombat promotion later developed into the Superkombat Fighting Championship, with its winners competing for the WKN titles.

In January 2011, International Vale Tudo Championship (IVC) announced its return with a new ruleset based on the Unified Rules of Mixed Martial Arts. On August 20, 2016, WKN brought IVC back to the international scene by co-promoting Micheletti Vs. Ortiz for the WKN World super cruiserweight World title in the main event of IVC 15 in Sao Paulo, Brazil. The event also included MMA bouts. Micheletti defeated Ortiz and took the title by knockout in the first round. After IVC 15, there were no more events and the organization is currently on hiatus. After IVC 15 there were no more events and the organization is currently on hiatus.

In 2014, WKN launched a world series of international kickboxing events named Simply the Best which was broadcast on FOX Sports and SFR Sport 5.

== WKN World Cup ==
WKN World Cup 2009 took place in St. Julian's, Malta on September 19, 2009 with up to 13 countries partaking, including Malta, Corsica, Belgium, Egypt, France, Poland, UK, among others.

WKN World Cup 2019 was held from November 28 to November 30, 2019, as an amateur championship contested by international athletes in their respective weight classes. It took place at The Trusts Arena in Auckland, New Zealand with up to 60 countries participating. The event marked the first time kickboxing and mixed martial arts world championships were contested at the same event in New Zealand. The WKN World Middleweight MMA title bout between Kelvin Joseph and Roan Carneiro as well as the WKN World Super Heavyweight championship bout between the champion Gregory Tony and former UFC Heavyweight title challenger and former Cage Rage World Heavyweight champion Antonio "Bigfoot" Silva were expected to headline the last day of competition.

The fight between Tony and Silva was cancelled, as Silva was not medically cleared after being knocked out in his previous bout. Carneiro won the fight against Joseph and took the title by submission in the first round.

== WKN Champions ==
- Tyrone Spong
- Jerome Le Banner
- Batu Khasikov
- Nathan Corbett
- John Wayne Parr
- Artem Levin
- Corentin Jallon
- Riyadh Al-Azzawi
- Vladimir Mineev
- Andrei Kulebin
- Yohan Lidon
- Xhavit Bajrami
- Dmitry Shakuta
- Alexander Ustinov
- Daniel Ghiță
- Cătălin Moroșanu
- Ionuț Atodiresei
- Amancio Paraschiv
- Ionuț Iftimoaie
- Nicolas Wamba
- Siniša Kovačić
- Ekaterina Vandaryeva
- Ondřej Hutník
- Youssef Boughanem
- Brandon Vieira
- Federico Roma
- Sudsakorn Sor Klinmee
- Jacko Ali
- Simon Dore
- Cristian Bosch

== Champions by weight class ==
WKN uses the following weight divisions.

Weight class name	Upper limit	Full Contact Champions	Kickboxing Champions	Oriental Rules Champions	K-1 Rules Champions	Muay Thai Champions	Kun Khmer Chanpions
Flyweight	117 lb (53.070 kg)	Vacant	Vacant	(Spain) Samvel Babayan	Vacant	(Spain) Stella Ortiz	Vacant
Super Flyweight	121 lb (54.885 kg)	(Argentina) Ignacio Capllonch	Vacant	Vacant	Vacant	Vacant	Vacant
Bantamweight	125 lb (56.699 kg)	(Italy) Emidio Molinari	Vacant	(Argentina) Ignacio Capllonch	Vacant	(Spain) Carlos Coello	Vacant
Super Bantamweight	129 lb (58.513 kg)	(Poland) Gerard Linder	(Croatia) Sinisa Kovavic	(Croatia) Marin Vrdoljak	(France) Brandon Vieira	(Argentina) Federico Roma	Vacant
Featherweight	133 lb (60.328 kg)	(Malta) Keith Azzopardi	(France) Gaylord Montier	(Northern Ireland) Jay Snoddon	Jay Snoddon	(Thailand) Yordniyom Yuttakangumtorn	Vacant
Super Featherweight	137 lb (62.142 kg)	(Georgia (country)) Sultanishvili Tsotne	(France) Brandon Vieira	(France) Karim Bennoui	Vacant	(Thailand) Benphet Asontep Phromsorn	(Argentina) Brian Bataglia
Lightweight	142 lb (64.410 kg)	(France) Yannick Reine	(France) Bryan Lang	(United Kingdom) Emile Hanna	(Spain) Khyzer Hayat		
Super Lightweight	147 lb (66.678 kg)	(France) Kamel Jebir	(France) Mohamed Galaoui	(United Kingdom) Emile Hanna	Vacant	Vacant	Vacant
Welterweight	154 lb (69.853 kg)	(France) Bruce Codron	Vacant	(South Korea) Lee Sung-hyun	Vacant	(Russia) Arbi Emiev	(Cambodia) Lorn Panha
Super Welterweight	161 lb (73.028 kg)	(France) Ludovic Millet	(France) Christian Berthely	(Spain) Jordi Requejo	Vacant	(Belgium) Youssef Boughanem	Vacant
Middleweight	168 lb (76.204 kg)	Vacant	Vacant	(Slovakia) Milan Kratochvila	Vacant	(Australia) Toby Smith	Vacant
Super Middleweight	175 lb (79.379 kg)	Vacant	(France) Dylan Colin	(France) Yohan Lidon	Vacant	Vacant	Vacant
Light Heavyweight	182 lb (82.554 kg)	Vacant	Vacant	Vacant	Vacant	(Cape Verde) Steven Mendes Furtado	Vacant
Super Light Heavyweight	189 lb (85.729 kg)	Vacant	Vacant	(France) Gregory Grossi	Vacant	(Belgium) Rahmani Madani	Vacant
Cruiserweight	196 lb (88.904 kg)	(United Kingdom) Mohammed Al-Azzawi	Vacant	(France) Corentin Jallon	Vacant	(Russia) Artem Levin	Vacant
Super Cruiserweight	205 lb (92.986 kg)	(United Kingdom) Riyadh Al-Azzawi	Vacant	(New Zealand) Bob Dhcamad Armstrong	(Brazil) Felipe Micheletti	(Germany) Gerardo Atti	Vacant
Heavyweight	230 lb (104.326 kg)	Vacant	(Russia) Vladimir Mineev	(France) Stephane Susperregui	Vacant	Vacant	Vacant
Super Heavyweight	Unlimited	Vacant	Vacant	(Poland) Tomasz Sarara	(France) Grégory Tony	(Belgium) Yassine Boughanem	Vacant

== See also ==
- Kickboxing
- List of kickboxing organizations
- World Association of Kickboxing Organizations
- World Kickboxing Association

== Sources ==
Books and articles

- (in French) "A History of Full Contact Karate
- "A History of Kickboxing" – Mikes Miles
- (in French) Delmas Alain, Callière Jean-Roger, Histoire du Kick-boxing, FKBDA, France, 1998
- (in French) Delmas Alain, Définition du Kick-boxing, FKBDA, France, 1999
- Miles Mikes, site An interview with Joe Lewis, 1998
