= Hopfenberg (Waltershausen) =

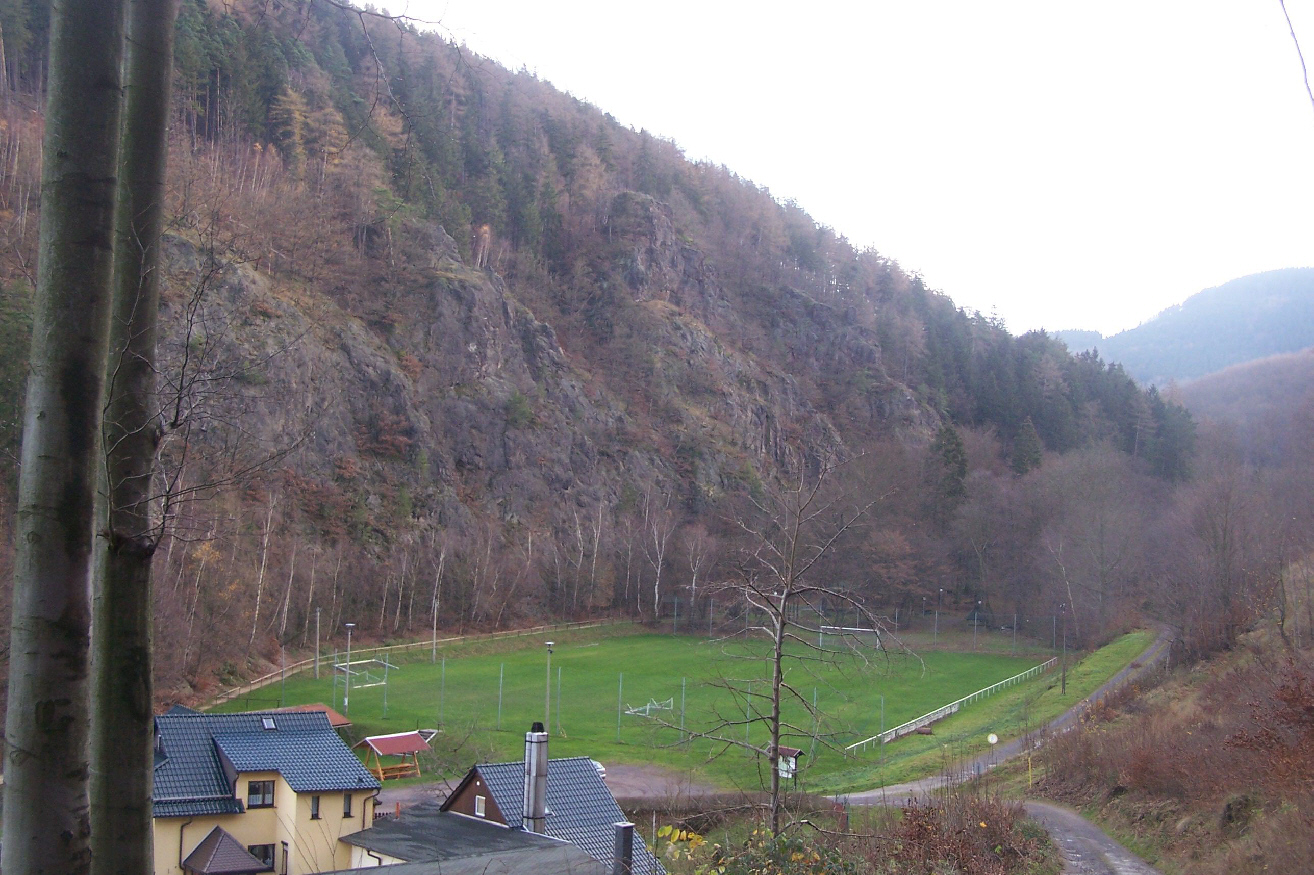
- View of the Treppenstein rock face on its southern slopes

Highest point
- Elevation: 536.1 m above sea level (NN) (1,759 ft)
- Coordinates: 50°52′40″N 10°27′37″E

Geography
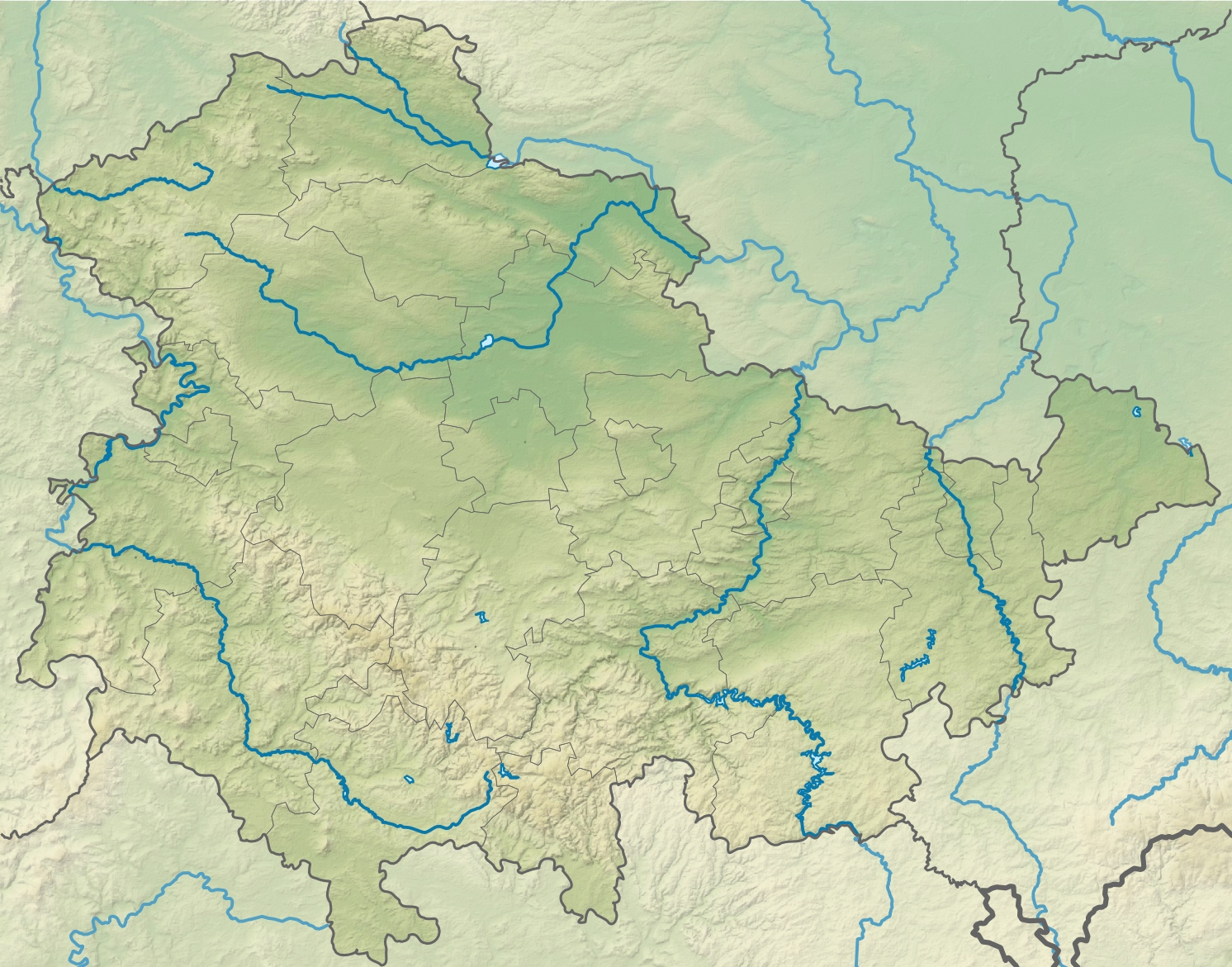
- Location within Thuringia
- Location: Thuringia, Germany
- Parent range: Thuringian Forest

Geology
- Rock type: andesite

The Hopfenberg is a wooded hill near Winterstein in the borough of Waltershausen, in the county of Gotha in the German state of Thuringia.

With a height of 536.1 m above NN, the Hopfenberg forms the eastern boundary of the Emse valley within the municipality of Winterstein. The hill, which is cleared on its western and northern flanks, was used in the Middle Ages for the cultivation of hops, from which the hill derives its name. The rocky southern face of the Hopfenberg towers over the Sembach valley by about 125 metres. The Kilianstein rock formation in the east of the valley recalls the conversion of local pagans by the missionary, St Kilian. The rock face on the Treppenstein is also impressive; here there used to be a quarry whose rock was used in the construction of forest tracks.
