= Men's Low-Kick at WAKO World Championships 2007 Belgrade -60 kg =

The men's lightweight (60 kg/132 lbs) Low-Kick category at the W.A.K.O. World Championships 2007 in Belgrade was the fourth lightest of the male Low-Kick tournaments involving thirteen fighters from three continents (Europe, Asia and Africa). Each of the matches was three rounds of two minutes each and were fought under Low-Kick rules.

As there were not enough fighters for a sixteen-man tournament, three of the competitors had byes through to the quarter finals. The tournament winner was Russian Zurab Faroyan who defeated multiple time world champion Eduard Mammadov from Azerbaijan by split decision in the gold medal match. Belarusian Dzianis Tselitsa and Turk Fikri Arican won bronze medals.

== Results ==
1st Round
(Kyrgyzstan) Daniarbek Asanov
(Portugal) Paulo Oliveira	D(3:0)
(Austria) Martin Gruber
(Ukraine) Yevgen Ruban	WO
(Serbia) Milos Anic	D(3:0)
(Kazakhstan) Yerkebulan Kushetov
(Turkey) Fikri Arican	D(3:0)
(Sweden) Jonas Ivung
(Iran) Mohammad Nezami	D(3:0)
(Croatia) Siniša Kovačić

Quarter Finals
(Belarus) Dzianis Tselitsa	D(3:0)
(Portugal) Paulo Oliveira
(Russia) Zurab Faroyan	D(3:0)
(Ukraine) Yevgen Ruban
(Serbia) Milos Anic
(Turkey) Fikri Arican	D(3:0)
(Iran) Mohammad Nezami
(Azerbaijan) Eduard Mammadov	D(3:0)

Semi Finals
(Belarus) Dzianis Tselitsa
(Russia) Zurab Faroyan	D(2:1)
(Turkey) Fikri Arican
(Azerbaijan) Eduard Mammadov	D(2:1)

Final
(Russia) Zurab Faroyan	D(2:1)
(Azerbaijan) Eduard Mammadov

=== Key ===
Abbreviation	Meaning
D (3:0)	Decision (Unanimous)
D (2:1)	Decision (Split)
WO	Walkover (No fight)

== See also ==
- List of WAKO Amateur World Championships
- List of WAKO Amateur European Championships
- List of male kickboxers
