= Timeline of the 2005 French riots =

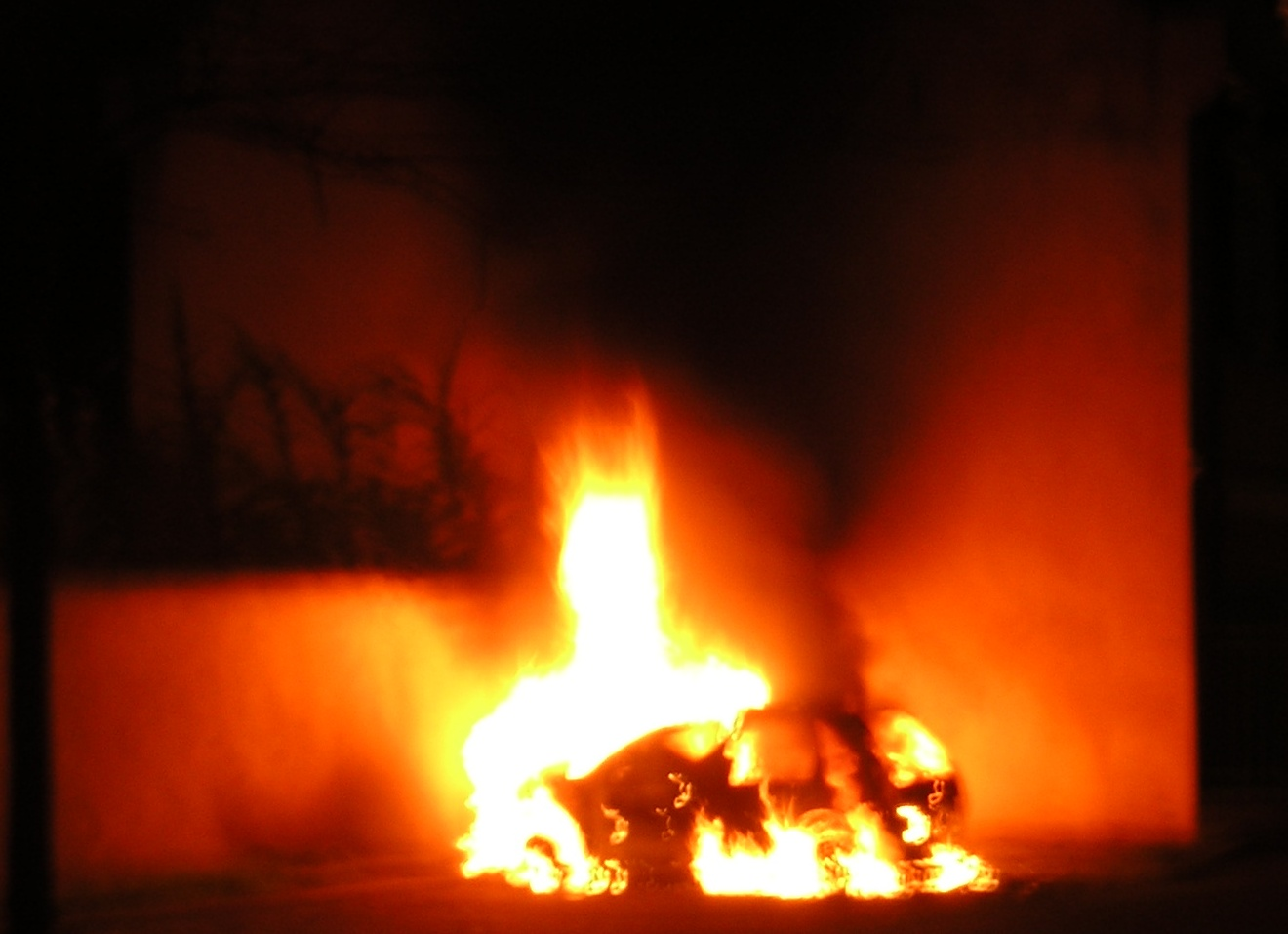
A car burns in Strasbourg, France on the night of 5 November as riots spread from the Paris banlieues to other parts of the country.

The following is a timeline of the 2005 French riots that began Thursday, 27 October 2005. Where the source lists events as occurring in a night and following morning, this article lists them on the date of the night, not the following morning. The extent table in the main article does the opposite.

== First week ==
- Thursday, October 27 – 1st night of rioting
  - Gangs, mostly consisting of hundreds of youths, clashed with police, throwing rocks and Molotov cocktails at police forces and firefighters, setting cars on fire, and vandalizing buildings. A shot was reportedly fired at police.
  - Police fired tear gas at the rioters. About 27 people were detained. 17 police officers and 3 journalists were wounded. The number of rioters and bystanders injured is not known.
- Friday, 28 October – 2nd night of rioting
  - Rioters in Clichy-sous-Bois apparently set more than 30 cars alight and made barricades of those cars, along with dustbins, which firefighters worked to clear away.
  - At least 200 riot police and crowds of young rioters clashed in on-and-off, running battles, on the night of the 28th and the early morning of the 29th.
- Saturday, 29 October – 3rd night of rioting
  - About 500 people took part in a silent march through Clichy-sous-Bois, in memory of the teenagers. Representatives of the Muslim community appealed for calm and dignity at the procession. Marchers wore t-shirts printed with the message mort pour rien "dead for nothing".
- Sunday, 30 October – 4th night of rioting
  - A tear gas grenade was launched into the mosque of the Cité des Bousquets, on what for Muslims is the holiest night of the holy month of Ramadan. Police denied responsibility but acknowledged that it was the same type used by French riot police. Speaking to 170 police officers at Seine-Saint-Denis prefecture in Bobigny (the local authority overseeing Clichy-sous-Bois), Nicolas Sarkozy said, "I am, of course, available to the Imam of the Clichy mosque to let him have all the details in order to understand how and why a tear gas bomb was sent into this mosque." Eyewitnesses also reported that police called women emerging from the mosque "whores" and other names.
- Monday, 31 October – 5th night of rioting
  - It was reported that the rioting had spread to other parts of Seine-Saint-Denis. In nearby Montfermeil, the municipal police garage was set on fire.
  - Michel Thooris, an official of police trade union Action Police CFTC (who only represents a minority of the police civil servants), described the unrest as a "civil war" and called on the French Army to intervene.
- Tuesday, 1 November – 6th night of rioting
  - Rioting had spread to nine other suburbs, across which 69 vehicles were torched.
  - A total of 150 arson attacks on garbage cans, vehicles and buildings were reported.
  - The unrest was particularly intense in Sevran, Aulnay-sous-Bois and Bondy, all in the Seine-Saint-Denis region, which is considered to be a "sensitive area of immigration and modest incomes."
  - In Sevran, youths set fire to two rooms of a primary school, along with several cars. Three officers were slightly injured.
  - In Aulnay-sous-Bois, rioters threw Molotov cocktails at the town hall and rocks at the firehouse; police fired rubber bullets at advancing rioters.
  - Interior Minister Nicolas Sarkozy refers to rioters as "scum"
  - French Prime Minister Dominique de Villepin "met Tuesday with the parents of the three families, promising a full investigation of the deaths and insisting on 'the need to restore calm,' the prime minister's office said."
- Wednesday, 2 November – 7th night of rioting
  - Reports suggest rioters briefly stormed a police station while 78 vehicles were torched.
  - One government official claims that live rounds were fired at riot police.
  - Two primary schools, a post office, and a shopping centre were damaged and a large car showroom set ablaze.
  - Police vans and cars were stoned as gangs turned on police.
  - Rioting had spread west-ward to the area of Hauts-de-Seine where a police station was bombarded with home-made Molotov cocktails.
  - Jacques Chirac, the President of France, made appeals for calm, and Prime Minister Dominique de Villepin held an emergency cabinet meeting. De Villepin issued a statement saying "Let's avoid stigmatising areas", an apparent rebuke to his political rival, Interior Minister Nicolas Sarkozy, who has called the rioters "scum" (racaille).
  - A woman on crutches in her fifties, Joëlle M., was doused with petrol in Sevran-Beaudotes and set on fire as she exited a bus; "She was rescued by the driver (Mohammed Tadjer) and hospitalized with severe burns"

== Second week ==
- Thursday, 3 November – 8th night of rioting
  - Traffic was halted on the RER B suburban commuter line which links Paris to Charles de Gaulle Airport after unions called for a strike.
  - Rioters attacked two trains overnight at the Le Blanc-Mesnil station, forced a conductor from one train and broke windows, the SNCF rail authority said. A passenger was lightly injured by broken glass.
  - For the first time the riots spread outside of Paris, spreading to Dijon with sporadic violence in Bouches-du-Rhône in the south and Rouen in the north-west of France.
  - In Parliament, de Villepin pledged again to restore order as his government has come under criticism for its failure to prevent the violence.
  - Around 1000 firemen were called to put out a blaze at a carpet factory while twenty-seven buses were set alight.
  - 500 cars were torched and arson occurred in Aulnay-sous-Bois, Neuilly-sur-Marne, Le Blanc Mesnil, and Yvelines. Additionally, 7 were burned in Paris, and others had their windows broken out near the metro station La Chapelle. Nationally, 593 vehicles were torched Thursday.
- Friday night, 4 November – 9th night of rioting
  - Violence continued in Val d'Oise, Seine-et-Marne and Seine-Saint-Denis. Arson and attacks on vehicles occurred in Aubervilliers, Sarcelles, Montmagny and Persan.
  - French police claim incidents Thursday night have diminished in intensity compared to the previous night, with only fifty vehicles set on fire. Prefect Jean-François Cordet said in a statement that "contrary to the previous nights, there were fewer direct clashes with the forces of order."
  - "Traore's brother, Siyakah Traore, called for protesters to 'calm down and stop ransacking everything.'".
  - Violence spread to Lille and Toulouse for the first time.
- Saturday, 5 November
  - Day
    - Police reported the discovery of a bomb making factory for producing gasoline bombs inside of a derelict building in Évry, south of Paris, raising questions on the possibility of planning well in advance of the riots. Six minors have been arrested.
    - Several thousand residents of Aulnay-sous-Bois joined a march in protest against the riots, initiated by the commune's mayor, Gérard Gaudron.
    - At noon, Prime Minister Dominique de Villepin met with Nicolas Sarkozy and other cabinet members.
    - Yves Bot, public prosecutor of the city of Paris, on Europe 1 radio described the events as organized violence, well beyond spontaneously erupting riots. Bot alleged that adolescents in other cities were being incited to commence rioting via the internet, saying that the violence was directed against institutions of the Republic, but he denied it being ethnic in character.
  - Night – 10th night of rioting
    - Around France, 897 vehicles were torched and 170 people arrested.
    - An incendiary device was tossed at the wall of a synagogue Pierrefitte-sur-Seine.
    - Firefighters were attacked while rescuing a sick person in Meaux.
    - Violence continued both within and outside Paris. In Grigny, two schools were set on fire.
    - Another school was set on fire in Vigneux.
    - A nursery school was burned in Achères, west of Paris, outraging residents who demanded that the French Army be deployed or that a citizens militia be formed.
    - In Torcy, close to Bussy-Saint-Georges, rioters set fire to a police station and a youth center.
    - Additional attacks occurred in Avignon (Vaucluse), Saint-Dizier (Haute-Marne), Soissons (Aisne), Nantes (Loire-Atlantique), Blois (Loir-et-Cher), Montauban (Tarn-et-Garonne) and in the north at Lille, Roubaix, Tourcoing, Mons-en-Baroeuil. Other incidents occurred in Cannes, Nice, and Toulouse.
    - In the Normandy city of Évreux, over 50 cars, a shopping center, a post office, and two schools were burned. 253 people were arrested.
- Sunday 6 November
  - Morning
    - Cars torched in central Paris for the first time, in the historic third district. There, citizens urged for the French Army to be deployed.
    - The total number of vehicles torched during the night is estimated at 1,295, the highest number so far. 193 people were arrested. An extra 2,300 police were drafted.
    - In broad daylight on Sunday, a Belgian RTBF news crew was physically assaulted in Lille, injuring a cameraman.
    - A Korean female journalist from KBS TV was knocked unconscious with repeated punches and kicks to her face and head in Aubervilliers
    - As of Sunday morning, tenth night, the total number of people arrested since 27 October surpassed 800, and the total number of vehicles set on fire is estimated to be around 3,500.
  - Night – 11th night of rioting
    - Rioters fired large-caliber ammunition from pistols and hunting rifles in the southern Parisian suburb of Grigny, injuring 34 policemen, three of them seriously. Two of them are reported to have been hit in the head. The shots ended at 8:30 pm; according to a journaliste of Le Monde and several social workers, this might be related to the beginning of the soccer match PSG–AS Monaco (France Inter, 7 November)
    - For the first time, Catholic churches have been attacked with Molotov cocktails in Liévin and Lens in Pas-de-Calais and Sète in Hérault.
    - 1408 vehicles have been torched during the night (982 vehicles were burned outside Paris), and 395 people were arrested. A Polish tourbus parked in Alfortville waiting to return a group of vacationers to Poland was one of the vehicles that were destroyed.
    - In the first incident outside France, five cars were torched in Saint-Gillis, Brussels, Belgium.
    - German police suspects that the torching of five vehicles in Berlin may potentially be connected to the rioting in Paris suburbs. Similar incidents have been registered in Bremen.
- Monday 7 November
  - Day
    - A 61-year-old man, Jean-Jacques Le Chenadec, a former Renault employee, died in the hospital because of the injuries sustained after being beaten when he went to check on a garbage can fire in the suburb of Stains. He succumbed to his injuries, becoming the first death caused by the riots. According to a witness, Jean-Jacques was 'deliberately assassinated'.
    - Rioter Moussa Diallo is quoted as saying: "This is just the beginning. It's not going to end until there are two policemen dead."
    - Eric Raoult, mayor of Raincy, which is one of the cities hit by the riots, has imposed a curfew on people younger than 15 years from 1 am to dawn.
    - France 3 has decided to stop revealing the toll of the riots and the number of cars torched in order to not inflame the situation.
    - Three French blog participants have been arrested for provoking the violence.
    - Jewish religious leaders in France report they have been advised by the government not to discuss their fears publicly in order to avoid further anti-Semitic attacks.
    - The Union of French Islamic Organizations (UOIF) issued a fatwa condemning the violence
    - De Villepin on the TF1 television channel announced the deployment of 18,000 police, supported by a 1,500 strong reserve.
  - Night – 12th night of rioting
    - Police said that violence in Seine-Saint-Denis was still simmering, but the situation was calmer than in the previous nights, with three times fewer calls to the fire services, but violence continued in the province.
    - In Toulouse, some 50 rioters stopped and torched a bus and ordered the driver to get out, hurling firebombs and other objects as police arrived
    - Two schools were torched in Lille Sud and in Bruay-sur-Escaut near the city of Valenciennes. A gymnasium was burned in Villepinte.
    - Additional violence and vandalism in eastern France in Alsace, Lorraine and Franche-Comté. Violence in Toulouse, Strasbourg, Blois, Moselle, and Doubs.
    - 1173 vehicles have been burned.
    - Prime Minister Dominique de Villepin announced that, starting on Wednesday, "wherever it is necessary, prefects will be able to impose a curfew". No army intervention is being planned.
- Tuesday 8 November
  - Day
    - The Belgian TV-station VTM reports that a Molotov cocktail was thrown into a school's bicycle parking during class hours, and that their reporters had been attacked on the scene.
    - President Jacques Chirac declares a state of emergency following an emergency session of his cabinet, and the re-activation of a 1955 law enacted during the Algerian War, allowing local authorities to impose curfews, beginning on Tuesday, 12 PM, with an initial 12-day limit.
  - Night – 13th night of rioting
    - Protestant church in Meulan attacked.
    - Youths threw firebombs at police and set cars ablaze in suburb of Toulouse. Dozens of youths set fire to at least 10 cars and threw objects at police.
    - As of midnight Central European Time, the French Republic is placed under a State of Emergency. The cities of Orléans, Blois and Amiens imposed curfews on minors below 16 years of age.
    - Senior interior ministry official Claude Gueant said police had seen "a very significant drop" in the intensity of the unrest. The number of cars set alight across France overnight Tuesday to Wednesday fell to 617, hundreds fewer than the night before. Some 280 people were arrested and disturbances broke out in 116 areas, half the number affected the preceding night.
    - Public transport in Lyon was shut down after a Molotov cocktail hit a train station.
    - In Bordeaux, a Molotov cocktail hit a gas-powered bus.
- Wednesday 9 November
  - Day
    - French businesses are worried that the cost of the past 13 nights of rioting that has swept the country could go beyond clean-up to hurt investment and consumer confidence going into the all-important winter shopping season. Concerns about the violence helped push the euro to two-year lows against the US dollar as companies postpone investment in some of the affected areas, potential tourists watch neighborhoods burn on television and the stakes increase the longer the riots continue.
    - Daniel Feurtet, the communist mayor of the riot-hit Le Blanc-Mesnil district, threatened to quit. "If the prefect decides to impose a curfew in one of our areas, I'll hand in my resignation right away", he told Le Monde newspaper, referring to the regional government officials empowered to impose curfews.
    - Interior minister Nicolas Sarkozy has ordered the expulsion of all foreigners convicted of taking part in the riots that have swept France for 13 nights. He told parliament 120 foreigners had been found guilty of involvement and would be deported without delay.
  - Night – 14th night of rioting
    - Authorities imposed curfews in 38 areas, including Marseille, Nice, Cannes, Strasbourg, Lyon, Toulouse and Paris. Incidents of vandalism decreased noticeably, with some clashes in Belfort, and a nursery school going up in flames in the southern city of Toulouse
    - 482 vehicles were burned and 203 arrests were made during the night.
    - The Paris area appeared quiet, according to authorities, and a spokesman for Seine-et-Marne said "the trouble is subsiding".
    - Several towns in the suburbs of Paris and elsewhere are organizing themselves to restore order.

== Third week ==
- Thursday 10 November
  - Day
    - French President Jacques Chirac has acknowledged his country has "undeniable problems" in poor city areas and must respond effectively. "Whatever our origins we are all the children of the Republic and we can all expect the same rights", he said.
    - Meanwhile, eight police officers have been suspended after a young man was beaten up in a Paris suburb. Police said two of the eight were suspected of illegally hitting the man arrested in La Courneuve, one of the riot hotspots. The other six officers are also being investigated as suspected witnesses to the incident on 7 November. "A medical statement shows the man has superficial bruises on his forehead and his feet", a police statement said.
    - Paris police chief Pierre Mutz banned the transport and purchase of petrol (gasoline) in cans, saying he fears violence is being planned in the capital itself.
    - Sarkozy said local authorities were instructed to deport foreigners convicted of involvement in the riots.
  - Night – 15th night of rioting
    - Police said 463 vehicles were set on fire across France, a slight fall from the previous night, but the number of vehicles torched in the areas around Paris rose from 84 to 111. 201 arrests were made during the night.
    - In Alpes-Maritimes, seven towns lifted curfews, including Cannes.
    - Justice Minister Pascal Clément said that in Paris, only two people had been arrested for violating curfews.
- Friday 11 November
  - Day
    - All public meetings likely to provoke disturbances are to be banned in the French capital, police have announced. The ban will begin at 0900 GMT on Saturday and end at 0700 GMT on Sunday. The police statement said the measure followed calls for "violent acts" in Paris on 12 November contained in recent e-mail and text messages.
    - Residents of suburban riot hotspots staged a sit-in near the Eiffel Tower on Friday, calling for an end to the car burnings and vandalism.
  - Night – 16th night of rioting
    - In Savigny-Le-Temple, a primary school was attacked and its creche destroyed.
    - In Amiens, about 30 vandals attacked a transformer, causing a blackout in the northern part of the town
    - In Rambouillet, two shops were destroyed.
    - In Carpentras, two fire bombs were thrown at a mosque. Remarkably, president Jacques Chirac immediately condemned the attack, while having remained silent for days when the riots first began.
    - The worst suburban unrest on Friday night was reported in Lyon and the city of Toulouse in the south-west. More than 500 cars were set on fire, two police officers were wounded and 206 people were detained across the country.
- Saturday 12 November
  - Day – Paris places a ban on all public meetings, to help stop rioting.
    - The ban started at 0900 GMT and will remain in force until Sunday morning.
    - Police in the city of Lyon have fired tear gas to break up groups of youths who hurled stones and bins hours before a curfew was due to begin.
  - Night – 17th night of rioting
    - A nursery school was torched in the southern town of Carpentras.
    - Ten people were arrested in Lyon after 50 youths damaged vehicles. Regional authorities for the first time declared a curfew for minors in Lyon. "It was the first rioting in a major city's downtown core in more than two weeks of violence."
    - A school was burned down in Carpentras.
    - "More than 370 cars were burned, down from 502 the previous night. A further 212 people were arrested", the BBC said. "Clashes were also reported in Toulouse, Dunkirk, Amiens and Grenoble."
- Sunday 13 November
  - Day
    - France has been offered 50m euros ($59m; £34m) by the European Union to help recover from more than two weeks of rioting in poor city suburbs. European Commission head José Manuel Durão Barroso said up to 1bn euros could be made available eventually for job creation and to help social cohesion. French insurers estimate that damage claims alone will reach 200m euros.
  - Night – 18th night of rioting
    - Some 284 vehicles were burned on Sunday night, down from a peak of over 1,000 a week earlier. 115 people were detained overnight.
- Monday 14 November
  - Day
    - The French government issues a proposal to extend the State of Emergency for three months.
    - French President Jacques Chirac has pledged to create opportunities for young people in an effort to prevent any resurgence of urban violence. In his first major speech since rioting began, M. Chirac spoke of a "crisis of meaning, a crisis of identity". He condemned the "poison" of racism, and announced measures for the training of 50,000 youths in 2007. Speaking at the Elysee Palace in front of the flags of France and the EU, M. Chirac said the wave of violence had highlighted a "deep malaise" within French society. "We are all aware of discrimination", the president said, calling for equal opportunities for the young and rejecting suggestions of a US-style quota system.
    - Many residents in poor neighborhoods hit by crime, high unemployment and a lack of prospects do not expect the government's plans to bear much fruit. "Nothing will change", Henri-Anne Dzerahovic, 61, said in the bleak Clichy-Sous-Bois suburb in the northeast of Paris. "I'm moving out of here. I've had enough. Anywhere you go, you're afraid of being attacked. Any time. Not just in the past two weeks. It's an awful climate", said Dzerahovic.
  - Night – 19th night of rioting
    - 215 vehicles (60 of which in the Île-de-France) were set on fire and 71 people were detained overnight.
- Tuesday 15 November
  - Day
    - The lower house of France's parliament has approved plans to extend special powers until 21 February 2006 to try to bring a wave of urban rioting under control. The emergency laws also need the approval of the Senate, which votes on the issue on Wednesday. Interior Minister Nicolas Sarkozy had told deputies France was facing one of its "sharpest and most complex urban crises", which required "firmness". He said most of those arrested in the riots were already known delinquents.
  - Night – 20th night of rioting
    - Violence subsided further, with 163 torched vehicles (27 of which in the Île-de-France) and 50 arrests. Only five communes had more than five cases of arson, among them Arras, Brest and Vitry-le-François with 11 each. In Romans-sur-Isère, a church was burnt in an arson attack. One policeman was injured in Pont-Evêque (Isère) as he was hit by a bottle filled with acid. Since 27 October, a total of 126 policemen were injured.
- Wednesday 16 November
  - Day
    - The French parliament has approved a three-month extension of emergency laws aimed at curbing riots by urban youths. The Senate on Wednesday passed the extension – a day after a similar vote in the lower house. The laws allow local authorities to impose curfews, conduct house-to-house searches and ban public gatherings. The lower house passed them by a 346–148 majority, and the Senate by 202–125.
    - Senior officials from President Jacques Chirac's centre-right party have suggested that polygamy is one factor in the riots, arguing children of polygamous families have less of a father figure and are more likely to live in overcrowded conditions. "Polygamy... prevents people being educated as they should be in an organised society. Tens of people cannot live in a single flat", Bernard Accoyer, leader of the Union for a Popular Majority (UMP) in the National Assembly lower house of parliament, told French radio. Polygamy is illegal in France but until 1993, it was possible for immigrants to bring more than one wife from their home country to join them. (Note: Islam allows a man to have up to four wives at a time.)

== Fourth week ==
- Thursday 17 November
  - Day
    - French police say levels of violence in France have returned to "normal", following three weeks of unrest by urban youths across the country. Police said 98 vehicles were torched on Wednesday night, marking a "return to a normal situation everywhere in France". The police service said the figure of 98 cars burnt was in line with the nightly average before the trouble began on 27 October. Authorities in the Rhone region, which covers Lyon and nearby south-eastern towns, lifted a curfew on minors after just eight cars were destroyed overnight.
    - French Muslim leaders denounced on Thursday efforts to blame Muslims and Islam for recent riots in the country's rundown suburbs and said they saw worrying signs of growing prejudice against their faith here. Many young rioters may have been from Muslim backgrounds, but their violent outburst was a protest against unemployment, poor housing and other bias they faced because of their foreign origins, they told journalists. "They didn't act like that because they're Muslims, but because of the misery they're living in", said Kamel Kabtane, rector of the Grand Mosque of Lyon in eastern France. "There weren't just Mohammads and Alis in those groups (of rioters) – there were Tonys and Daniels too", said Dalil Boubakeur, the Paris Grand Mosque rector who is also head of France's official Muslim Council (CFCM).
- Friday 18 November
  - Day
    - French Equal Opportunities Minister Azouz Begag has urged the government to overturn a ban on collecting data based on ethnicity or religion. Government bodies and private companies are barred from gathering such data – which is deemed potentially divisive. But M. Begag told Le Figaro newspaper it was important to assess the presence of minorities in various professions. Job discrimination was a key complaint voiced by many youths who rioted in immigrant suburbs in recent weeks. "We need to see France's true colours", M. Begag said. "To do that, we need to measure the proportion of immigrant children among the police, magistrates, in the civil service as well as in the private sector."
