= Schmerbach =

Schmerbach may refer to:

- Schmerbach (Herrgottsbach), a river of Baden-Württemberg, Germany, headstream of the Herrgottsbach
- Schmerbach (Rauhe Ebrach), a river of Baden-Württemberg, Germany, tributary of the Rauhe Ebrach
- Schmerbach, a village of the former municipality Emsetal, Thuringia, Germany
- Schmerbach, a subdivision of the town Creglingen, Baden-Württemberg, Germany
- Schmerbach am Kamp, a subdivision of the municipality Pölla, Lower Austria
