= Federico Roma =

Argentinian kickboxer

- Born: Federico Roma; 27 June 1985 (age 41); Buenos Aires, Argentina
- Other names: El Satiro; The Little Big Man
- Height: 167 cm (5 ft 6 in)
- Weight: 56 kg (123 lb; 8 st 11 lb)
- Division: Bantamweight; Super Bantamweight
- Stance: Southpaw
- Team: Dojo Serpiente
- Trainer: Cristian Bosch

Professional boxing record
- Total: 3
- Wins: 3

Kickboxing record
- Total: 71
- Wins: 64
- By knockout: 32
- Losses: 6
- By knockout: 2
- Draws: 1

Other information
- Boxing record from BoxRec

Federico Roma (born 27 June 1985) is the Argentine kickboxer and Muay Thai fighter, who has held World Kickboxing Network Super Bantamweight world titles in two styles, oriental rules and Thai boxing.

== Career ==
On 12 September 2015 Roma challenged the defending champion Tomasz Makowski for WKN World Super Bantamweight title under oriental rules in Zielona Góra, Poland. He won the fight and became a new champion by way of TKO in the fourth round.

On 1 October 2017 Roma fought Tristan Gaetano for a vacant WKN World Super Bantamweight Muay Thai title in the main event of Simply the Best 15 Moreno, in Moreno, Buenos Aires, Argentina. He won the fight by a unanimous decision.

On 3 March 2019 Roma fought Tenshin Nasukawa in the quarterfinal bout of the 58 kg tournament at RISE World Series 2019 in Tokyo, Japan. He lost the fight by knockout in the third round.

On 6 July 2019 Roma fought Darwin Saavedra at Bosch Tour 2019: Estrellas de Acero in Morón, Argentina. He won the fight by knockout in the second round.

== Titles and accomplishments ==
- World Kickboxing Network
  - 2017 WKN Muay Thai World Super Bantamweight Champion
  - 2015 WKN Oriental rules World Super Bantamweight Champion

== Fight record ==
Kickboxing record
64 Wins (32 (T)KOs), 7 Losses, 1 Draw
Date	Result	Opponent	Event	Location	Method	Round	Time
2019-10-26	Loss	(China) Wang Junguang	ONE Championship: Dawn Of Valor	Jakarta, Indonesia	TKO (3 Knockdowns/Punches)	1	2:57
2019-07-06	Win	(Uruguay) Darwin Saavedra	Bosch Tour 2019: Estrellas de Acero	Morón, Argentina	KO (Knee to the body)	2	1:36
2019-03-10	Loss	(Japan) Tenshin Nasukawa	Rise World Series 2019 First Round, -58 kg Tournament Quarter Final	Tokyo, Japan	KO (Cartwheel kick)	3	1:35
2017-10-01	Win	(France) Tristan Gaetano	Simply the Best 15 Moreno	Moreno, Argentina	Decision (Unanimous)	5	3:00
Wins the vacant WKN Muay Thai World Super Bantamweight title.
2017-07-	Win	(Mexico) Israel Rangel		Mexico City, Mexico	KO (Elbow)	2	
Wins WKC Muay Thai Intercontinental -58kg title.
2016-10-30	Win	(Uruguay) Nestor Machado		Buenos Aires, Argentina	KO (Punches)	2	
2016-03-25	Win	(Chile) Felipe Bocaz	Bosch Tour	Moreno, Argentina	Decision (Unanimous)	5	3:00
2015-09-12	Win	(Poland) Tomasz Makowski	Makowski Fighting Championship 8	Zielona Góra, Poland	TKO (injury)	4	
Wins WKN Oriental rules World Super Bantamweight title.
2015-06-05	Win	(Slovakia) Tomas Tadlanek	Simply the Best "Argentina Fight Night"	Buenos Aires, Argentina	KO (Low kick)	4	
Wins WKN Muay Thai Intercontinental Super Bantamweight title.
2014-12-19	Win	(Brazil) Claudio Marcelino	"Simply the Best 2 Caseros"	Buenos Aires, Argentina	Decision (Unanimous)	3	3:00
Wins WKN Muay Thai South America title.
2014-	Win	(Argentina) Gaston Gomez		Argentina	KO (High kick)	2	
2014-07-20	Loss	(Argentina) Juan Allevato	2K9 UNLIMITED	Buenos Aires, Argentina	Decision (Majority)	5	3:00
For the WKF Muay Thai Argentina title.
2014-04-25	Win	(Argentina) Cesar Benitez		Argentina	Decision (Unanimous)	3	3:00
2014-02-22	Loss	(France) Jerome Ardissone		Nice, France	Decision (Unanimous)	12	2:00
For the WKN Full-Contact World -55kg title.
2013-10-04	Win	(Argentina) Marcelo Mendieta		Buenos Aires, Argentina	Decision	3	3:00
2013-09-22	Win	(Argentina) Enzo Nahuel		Buenos Aires, Argentina	Decision	5	3:00
2013-08-23	Win	(Argentina) Jonatan Servidio		Buenos Aires, Argentina	Decision	3	3:00
2013-	Win	(Thailand)	Bangla Boxing Stadium	Phuket, Thailand	TKO (Doctor stoppage)	2	
2013-	Win	(Thailand)	Bangla Boxing Stadium	Phuket, Thailand	KO (Elbow)	1	
2013-05-12	Win	(Argentina) Anibal Cianciaruso	2K9 UNLIMITED	Buenos Aires, Argentina	Decision	5	3:00
2013-04-05	Win	(Argentina)		Buenos Aires, Argentina	KO (Low kick)	2	
2013-	Win	(Republic of Ireland) Monroe		Buenos Aires, Argentina	TKO	1	
2012-12-	Win	(Argentina) Manuel León		Buenos Aires, Argentina	TKO (Referee stoppage)	2	
2012-	Win	(Argentina) Federico Gentiluomo		Argentina	Decision	3	3:00
2012-08-24	Loss	(Peru) Alejandro Berrocal	Pepe Gordillo Producciones & CMK	Peru	Decision	3	3:00
2012-08-18	Win	(Argentina) Cristian Nieto		Buenos Aires, Argentina	TKO (Corner stoppage)	2	
2012-06-	Win	(Thailand)	Bangla Boxing Stadium	Phuket, Thailand	KO (Punch)	2	
2012-04-01	Win	(Argentina) Jorge Clavijo		Buenos Aires, Argentina	TKO (Referee stoppage)	2	
2012-	Win	(Argentina) Javier Verchelli		Argentina	Decision	3	3:00
2011-11-27	Win	(Argentina) Damian Medina		Buenos Aires, Argentina	TKO (Doctor stoppage)	2	
2011-11-05	Win	(Argentina) Dario Coria		Buenos Aires, Argentina	Decision	5	2:00
2011-10-02	Win	(Argentina) Jose Chauque	Club de la Pelea	Buenos Aires, Argentina	Decision (Unanimous)	3	3:00
2011-	Win	(Argentina) Leonardo Carrera		Buenos Aires, Argentina	KO (Low kick)	1	2:27
2010-02-14	Win	(Argentina) Leonardo Lescano		Buenos Aires, Argentina	Decision	5	2:00
2009-02-28	Loss	(Argentina) Leo Carrera		Quilmes, Argentina	KO (Punch)		
2008-	Win	(Uruguay) Maxi Rodriguez		Uruguay	KO (Spinning wheel kick)	3	
2008-10-05	Win	(Argentina) Maquina Gomez	Club de la Pelea	Buenos Aires, Argentina	Decision	3	3:00
2008-08-31	Win	(Argentina) Tano Sopranzi		Buenos Aires, Argentina	TKO	2	
2008-	Win	(Argentina) Lucas Dadamo		Uruguay	Decision	3	3:00
2008-	Win	(Uruguay) Herwin Gomes	International Kick Boxing III	Uruguay	KO (Punch)	2	
Legend: Win Loss Draw/No contest Notes

== Professional Boxing record ==
3 fights	3 wins	0 losses
By knockout	3	0

No.	Result	Record	Opponent	Type	Round, time	Date	Location	Notes
3	Win	3–0	Bruno Figueroa	TKO	2 (4)	2018	Buenos Aires, Argentina	
2	Win	2–0	Carlos Oscar Diaz	TKO	3 (4)	18 April 2015	Gimnasio Equipo Simal, San Justo, Argentina	
1	Win	1–0	Alejandro Simon Ortigoza	TKO	1 (4)	30 November 2014	Club Argentino de Castelar, Castelar, Argentina	
