= Kilianstein =

Coordinates: 50°52′28.58″N 10°27′50.42″E

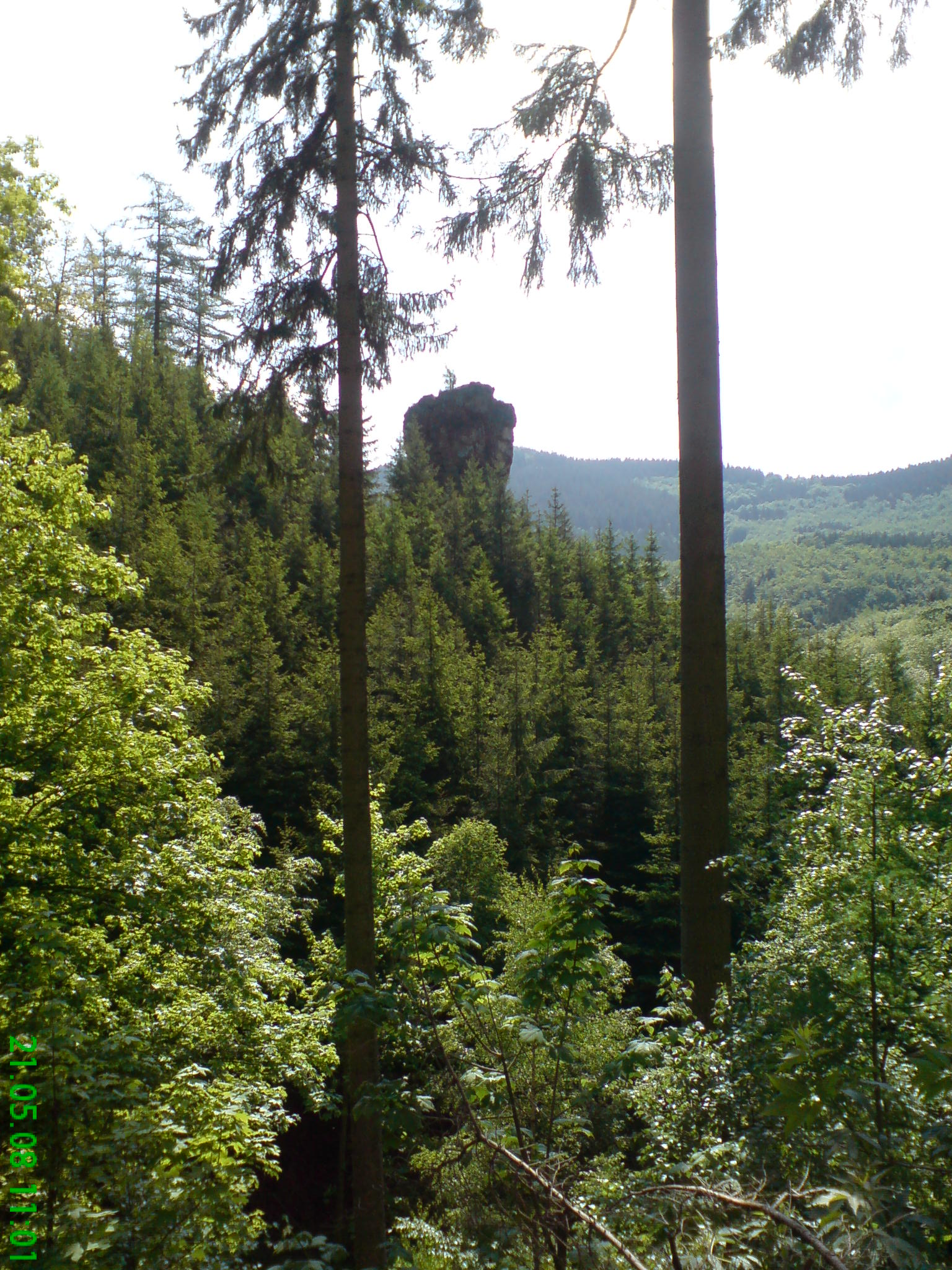
The summit of Kilianstein rises above the surrounding trees

The Kilianstein is a free-standing rock tower on the Hopfenberg hill in the eastern part of the Sembach valley in central Germany. It stands about 800 m east of the (upper) village of Winterstein on the northern slopes of the Thuringian Forest in Germany.

The pinnacle is about 15 metres high and some 500 m above sea level (NN). It consists of a relatively crumbly quartz porphyry and is visited, albeit rarely, by sports climbers. Several trails are signposted from here, climbing routes have been established on the rock and on the top is a summit register.

According to one Winterstein legend, this rock was formed when the devil rammed his walking stick into the ground in anger at the success of the missionary St. Kilian in converting the local pagans, and the tip of his stick remained embedded.
