= Svibovec Podravski =

- Village
- Location of Svibovec Podravski in Croatia
- Coordinates: 46°21′17″N 16°16′51″E
- Country: Croatia
- County: Varaždin County
- City: Sračinec

Area
  - Total: 13.4 km^{2} (5.2 sq mi)

Population (2021)
  - Total: 871
  - Density: 65.0/km^{2} (168/sq mi)
- Time zone: UTC+1 (CET)
  - Summer (DST): UTC+2 (CEST)
- Postal code: 42000 Varaždin
- Area code: +385 (0)42

Svibovec Podravski is a village in Croatia. It is connected by the D2 highway.
