= Corentin Jallon =

French kickboxer

- Born: Lyon, France
- Nationality: (France) French
- Height: 1.91 m (6 ft 3 in)
- Weight: 91 kg (201 lb; 14.3 st)
- Division: Heavyweight; Cruiserweight
- Style: Kickboxing, Muay Thai
- Stance: Orthodox
- Fighting out of: France
- Team: AJSR Saint Raphaël
- Trainer: Badri Rouabhia

Kickboxing record
- Total: 36
- Wins: 22
- By knockout: 10
- Losses: 12
- By knockout: 2
- Draws: 2

Other information
- Children: 3 filles

Corentin Jallon is a French kickboxer competing in the heavyweight and cruiserweight division. He is the former World Kickboxing Network (WKN) Cruiserweight World Champion as well as the Muaythai & K-1 FFSCDA France -91kg Champion, King of the Ring -91 kg Champion and he has competed in Superkombat. In 2013, Jallon became the WKN World Champion after defeating Cristian Bosch in Buenos Aires, Argentina.

== Early life ==
Jallon was born in France and was introduced to kickboxing at a later age. He started training with his coach Badri Rouabhia at AJSR in Saint Raphaël and competed in his first match at the age 26 years old.

== Career ==
=== Kickboxing ===
On Juin 30, 2012, Jallon faced Zinedine Hameur-Lain at the Pro fightKarate 4 in the heavyweight category and lost on points.

On May 24, 2014, Jallon fought Sebastian Ciobanu -95 kg to a draw with at SUPERKOMBAT World Grand Prix II 2014 in Constanta, Romania.

On May 10, 2014, Jallon avenged his previous 2012 loss and rematched Zinedine Hameur-Lain at King of the Ring 3 in Longeville-lès-Metz, Metz, France, winning by TKO in the first round.

On September 23, 2017, Jallon faced Romain Falendry and lost by decision.

On December 2, 2017, Jallon faced the Spanish Ivan Valenzuela at La 13ème Nuit Du Muay Thai in France and won by decision.

On April 27, 2019, Jallon faced Gabriele Casella at Fighting Spirit 7 in Rome, Italy and lost by decision.

On December 14, 2019, Jallon faced Anthony Valerde under K-1 rules in L'Isle-sur-la-Sorgue, France and lost by decision.

==== WKN ====
On October 13, 2012, Jallon had his first shot at a World Kickboxing Network title, when he faced 2007 WAKO World Championship finalist and PFL fighter Sadibou Sy. The match was for the WKN European Cruiserweight title in Berns, Stockholm. Both athletes threw some hard strikes, but ultimately the fight went to the judges, declaring Sadibou Sy victorious by decision.

In 2013, during a winning streak, Jallon was offered to fight against the current WKN Cruiserweight Champion (-195 lbs/-88.5 kg), Argentinian Cristian Bosch. On August 4, 2013, Jallon faced Bosch in Buenos Aires, Argentina. The first round started wrong for Jallon received some heavy damage from the champion, resulting in two standing 8 counts. In the third round, Jallon landed an elbow on Bosch's face, securing the knockout win and become the new WKN Cruiserweight Champion.

On May 15, 2015, Jallon defended his WKN cruiserweight title against the Czech Ondrej Srubek in Prague, winning on points.

On September 12, 2015, Jallon put his WKN title on the line when he faced the Slovak Adrian Valentin in Saint-Raphaël, France. Jallon shook Valentin early with some punches, but the Slovak recovered well and was able to land many shots from the outside in the following rounds. Adrian Valentin was declared winner by decision, capturing the WKN Cruiserweight title.

=== Lethwei ===
In 2017, Jallon challenged Dave Leduc, Openweight Lethwei World Champion under traditional Lethwei rules. The traditional challenge was accepted and on December 10, 2017, Jallon faced Leduc inside the Thein Pyu Stadium in Yangon, Myanmar. Just before their first exchange, Leduc performed the Lekkha moun and Jallon automatically replied with a flurry of punches, which Leduc countered with an elbow counterattack. Jallon was floored several times during the fight and used his two minute injury time-out, but finished the bout on his feet, making it a draw according to Lethwei rules. Leduc retained the openweight Lethwei World championship title.

== Championships and accomplishments ==
=== Championships ===
- World Kickboxing Network
  - WKN Cruiserweight World Championship (one time)
- Other championships
  - King of the Ring 3 Champion 91 kg
  - FFSCDA National Muaythai Champion 91 kg
  - FFSCDA National K-1 Champion 91 kg

== Lethwei record ==
Professional Lethwei record
0 wins (0 (T)KOs), 0 losses, 1 draw
Date	Result	Opponent	Event	Location	Method	Round	Time
2017-12-10	Draw	(Canada) Dave Leduc	2018 Myanmar Lethwei World Championship	Yangon, Myanmar	Draw	5	3:00
For the Air KBZ Aung Lan Championship 2017
Legend: Win Loss Draw/no contest Notes

== Kickboxing record ==
Professional kickboxing record
22 wins (10 KOs), 12 losses, 2 draws
Date	Result	Opponent	Event	Location	Method	Round	Time
2021-12-18	Win	(Italy) Giorgio Muccini	La Nuit des Challenges 20	Saint-Fons, France	TKO (referee stoppage)	1	
2021-12-04	Loss	(France) Diaguely Camara	K1 Event 14	Troyes, France	Decision (unanimous)	3	3:00
2019-12-14	Loss	(France) Anthony Valerde	10 Deal Event II	L'Isle-sur-la-Sorgue, France	Decision	3	3:00
2019-07-07	Draw	(Italy) Enrico Pellegrino	Thai Night 2	Lecce, Italy	Draw	3	3:00
2019-04-27	Loss	(Italy) Gabriele Casella	Fighting Spirit 7	Rome, Italy	Decision	5	3:00
2018-12-01	Win	(Italy) Angelo Mirno	Extreme Fight For Heroes 6	Draguignan, France	Decision	5	3:00
2018-06-23	Loss	(France) Anthony Leroy	Le Spartacus III	Nice, France	Decision	3	3:00
2017-12-02	Win	(Spain) Ivan Valenzuela	La 13ème Nuit Du Muay Thai	Saint-Pryvé-Saint-Mesmin, France	Decision	5	3:00
2017-09-23	Loss	(France) Romain Falendry	Extreme Fight For Heroes 5	Saint-Tropez, France	Decision	3	3:00
2016-04-02	Win	(France) Jean Philippe Guigo	Extreme Fight For Heroes 4	Draguignan, France	KO	2	
2015-11-14	Loss	(France) Halim Chibani	Nuit des Champions 2015	Marseille, France	Decision	3	3:00
2015-09-12	Loss	(Slovakia) Adrian Valentin	Battle of Saint-Raphael 3	Saint-Tropez, France	Decision	3	3:00
Lost WKN Cruiserweight World Championship
2015-07-04	Win	(Italy) Umberto Lucci	MFC 2	Lons-le-Saunier, France	Decision	3	3:00
2015-05-25	Win	(Czech Republic) Ondej Srubek	Simply The Best 4	Prague, Czech Republic	Decision	3	3:00
Defends WKN Cruiserweight World Championship
2015-04-11	Win	(France) Jean-Philippe Guigo	Battle of Saint Raphael 2	Saint-Raphaël, France	Decision	3	3:00
2014-08-04	Loss	(Belgium) Filip Verlinden	Fight Night Saint-Tropez II	Saint-Tropez, France	Decision	3	3:00
2014-06-27	Win	(France) Pacôme Assi	Battle of Saint Raphael 2	Saint-Raphaël, France	Decision	3	3:00
2014-05-24	Draw	(Romania) Sebastian Ciobanu	Superkombat World Grand Prix II 2014	Mamaia, Romania	Draw	3	3:00
2014-05-10	Win	(France) Zinedine Hameur-Lain	King of the Ring 3	Metz, France	TKO	1	
Wins King of the Ring Championship -91 kg
2013-11-23	Win	(France) Hichem Medoukali	Nuit des Champions 2013	Marseille, France	KO	2	
2013-10-04	Win	(Argentina) Cristian Bosch	Cedem de Caseros	Buenos Aires, Argentina	KO	3	
Wins WKN Cruiserweight World Championship
2013-06-15	Win	(France) Vladislav Alexandrov	The Battle of Saint-Raphael	Saint-Raphaël, France	TKO	2	
2013-05-10	Win	(France) Ulrich Emmanuel	The Game	Saint-Denis, Réunion, France	KO	2	
Wins FFSCDA National Muaythai Champion -91 kg
2013-04-27	Win	(France) Mohamed Chaher	Championnat d'Europe K1 Rules	Sainte-Maxime, France	Decision	3	3:00
Wins FFSCDA National K-1 Champion -91 kg
2012-12-15	Win	(France) Fabien Fouquet	Championnat du Monde K1 rules	Saint-Raphaël, France	TKO	2	
2012-10-13	Loss	(Sweden) Sadibou Sy	Supremacy League	Stockholm, Sweden	Decision (unanimous)	5	3:00
For WKN European Oriental Rules Cruiserweight title
2012-06-30	Loss	(France) Zinedine Hameur-Lain	Pro Fight Karaté 4, Semi Finals	Levallois-Perret, France	Decision	3	3:00
2011-06-18	Win	(France) Samih Bachar	Gala de Muaythai France	Nanterre, France	Decision	3	3:00
2011-05-07	Win	(France) Rida Titri	Gala Remi Telani 7	Villeurbanne, France	KO	2	
2011-04-02	Win	(France) Khalid Azzouzi	Gala Remi Telani 7	La Crau, France	KO	1	
2011-03-06	Loss	(Lithuania) Arnold Oborotov	KO Bloodline Show	London, England	KO	1	
2010-04-24	Loss	(France) Stéphane Susperregui	Fight Zone 4	Villeurbanne, France	Decision	3	3:00
2010-04-03	Win	(France) David Radeff	K1 Events, Championnat d'Europe de K1	Troyes, France	Decision	3	3:00
2009-12-05	Win	(Belgium) Mohamed Benyach	The Punishment	Anderlecht, Belgium	Decision	3	3:00
2009-09-02	Win	(Thailand) Salatun	Chaweng Stadium	Koh Samui, Thailand	Decision	5	3:00
2009-00-00	Loss	(Albania) Besim Kabashi	Steko's Fight Night	Munich, Germany	Decision	3	3:00
2008-12-06	Loss	(Australia) Thor Hoopman	Evolution 15	Brisbane, Australia	KO	5	
Legend: Win Loss Draw/no contest Notes

== See also ==
- List of male kickboxers
