= Gabriele Casella =

Italian male kickboxer (born 1994)

- Born: 23 June 1994 (age 32); Rome, Italy
- Height: 1.88 m (6 ft 2 in)
- Weight: 85 kg (187 lb; 13 st 5 lb)
- Division: Light Heavyweight; Cruiserweight
- Style: Muay Thai, Kickboxing
- Fighting out of: Rome, Italy
- Team: Aurora Mixed Martial Arts; Team the Magnificent
- Years active: 2013–present

Kickboxing record
- Total: 18
- Wins: 16
- By knockout: 7
- Losses: 2
- By knockout: 0

Mixed martial arts record
- Total: 1
- Wins: 1
- By knockout: 1

Other information
- Boxing record from BoxRec

Gabriele Casella (born 23 June 1994) is an Italian kickboxer. He is the former WAKO World Light Heavyweight champion, the former WMO World Light Heavyweight champion, and two time Italian national champion.

== Kickboxing and muay thai career ==
=== Early career ===
Casella made his professional debut against Giuseppe D'Amuri at The Night Of The Wolf 2 on May 25, 2013. He won the fight by a first-round knockout. After stopping Roman Kozac in the second round at Kombat Night VI on July 5, 2013, Casella was booked to face Martin Meoni for the Federkombat -75 kg Muaythai title at Grand Prix Roma 2013 on November 16, 2013. He won the fight by unanimous decision.

Casella faced the former two-time World Boxing Council Muaythai European champion Wendy Annonay at Grande Soirée de la Boxe on March 14, 2015. He won the fight by a unanimous decision.

He fought Peemai Jitmuangnon in September 2015, during The Circle. He won the fight by a unanimous decision. He fought another Thai athlete, Sor Klinmee, 10 months later, and won by a first round KO.

=== WAKO Pro Light heavyweight champion ===
Casella faced Grégory Grossi for the WAKO-Pro World K-1 Light Heavyweight title at Monte-Carlo Fighting Masters on June 24, 2016. He won the five round affair by a unanimous decision.

Casella faced Lawrence Smithen for the WMO World Light Heavyweight title at Monte-Carlo Fighting Masters on April 29, 2017. He won the fight by unanimous decision.

He fought outside of Europe for the first time on June 10, 2017, at Kunlun Fight 62, as he was booked to face Artur Kyshenko. He lost the fight by a unanimous decision.

Casella was booked to face Rémy Vectol at Thai Fight Rome on April 21, 2018. He won the fight by a first-round technical knockout.

Casella was afterwards scheduled to make his Bellator Kickboxing debut against Alexandru Negrea at Bellator Rome on July 14, 2018. He won the fight by unanimous decision. Casella made his second appearance under the Bellator banner against Dani Taore at Bellator Kickboxing 11 on December 1, 2018.

Casella was scheduled to face the former WKN Cruiserweight champion Corentin Jallon at Fighting Spirit 7 on April 27, 2019. He won the fight by unanimous decision.

Casella faced Nikos Provias at Fighting Spirit 2022 on March 23, 2022, following a three-year absence from the sport of kickboxing. He won the fight by a second-round technical knockout.

== Boxing career ==
Casella took part in the 2019 Italian national boxing championship, competing in the heavyweight event. He beat Alessandro Gaglianese by referee stoppage in the first round, Gianluca Rosciglione by points in the quarterfinals and Domenico Norvetta by referee stoppage in the semifinals. These three victories earned him the right to face Davide Brito in the tournament finals, who Casella beat on points.

Casella fought with the Italian national boxing team at the Castellon de la Plan. He was scheduled to face Enmanuel Reyes of the Spanish team on the fifth day of the competition, on October 10, 2020. Reyes won the fight by unanimous decision.

== Championships and accomplishments ==
=== Professional ===
- Federazione Italiana Kickboxing
  - 2013 Federkombat -75 kg Muaythai Championship
  - 2015 Federkombat -81 kg Muaythai Championship
- World Association of Kickboxing Organizations
  - 2016 WAKO-Pro World K-1 Light Heavyweight Championship
- World Muaythai Organization
  - 2017 WMO World Light Heavyweight Championship

=== Amateur ===
- World Association of Kickboxing Organizations
  - 2012 WAKO World Junior Championships Full Contact -75 kg (gold)
  - 2014 WAKO European Championships Full Contact -81 kg (silver)
  - 2015 WAKO World Championships K-1 -86 kg (gold)

== Mixed martial arts record ==
Professional record breakdown
1 match	1 win	0 losses
By knockout	1	0
By submission	0	0
By decision	0	0

Res.	Record	Opponent	Method	Event	Date	Round	Time	Location	Notes
Win	1–0	Rob Earls	TKO (punches)	Cage Warriors 195	October 4, 2025	1	0:25	Rome, Italy	Middleweight debut.

== Muay Thai and kickboxing record ==
Professional Muay Thai & kickboxing record
16 wins (7 (T)KOs), 2 losses, 0 draws, 0 no contests
Date	Result	Opponent	Event	Location	Method	Round	Time
2022-03-23	Win	(Greece) Nikos Provias	Fighting Spirit 2022	Rome, Italy	TKO (punches)	2	0:47
2019-04-27	Win	(France) Corentin Jallon	Fighting Spirit 7	Rome, Italy	Decision (unanimous)	3	3:00
2018-12-01	Win	(Germany) Dani Taore	Bellator Kickboxing 11	Rome, Italy	Decision (unanimous)	3	3:00
2018-07-14	Win	(Romania) Alexandru Negrea	Bellator Rome	Rome, Italy	Decision (unanimous)	3	3:00
2018-04-21	Win	(France) Rémy Vectol	Thai Fight Rome	Rome, Italy	TKO (punches)	1	2:18
2017-06-10	Loss	(Ukraine) Artur Kyshenko	Kunlun Fight 62	Bangkok, Thailand	Decision (unanimous)	3	3:00
2017-04-29	Win	(United Kingdom) Lawrence Smithen	Fighting Spirit	Rome, Italy	Decision (unanimous)	5	3:00
Wins the WMO World Light Heavyweight title.
2016-06-24	Win	(France) Grégory Grossi	Monte-Carlo Fighting Masters	Monaco	Decision (unanimous)	5	3:00
Wins the WAKO World K-1 Cruiser Light Heavyweight title.
2016-04-30	Win	(Thailand) Ekapop Sor Klinmee	Fighting Spirit	Rome, Italy	KO (head kick)	1	1:17
2015-09-12	Win	(Thailand) Peemai Jitmuangnon	The Circle	Barcelona, Spain	Decision (unanimous)	3	3:00
2015-05-17	Win	(Italy) Hosan Radwan	Fighting Spirit Muay Thai 4	Rome, Italy	TKO (elbow)	2	1:50
Wins the Federkombat -81kg Muaythai title.
2015-04-12	Win	(Belgium) Madani Rahmani	International Fight	Rome, Italy	TKO	1	
2015-03-14	Win	(France) Wendy Annonay	Grande Soirée de la Boxe	Tours, France	Decision (unanimous)	3	3:00
2014-05-16	Win	(Italy) Jawad El Byari	Invictus Arena 6	Rome, Italy	Decision (unanimous)	3	3:00
2014-04-12	Loss	(Italy) Francesco Palermo	Knock Out Action 8	Savignano sul Rubicone, Italy	Decision (unanimous)	3	3:00
2013-11-16	Win	(Italy) Martin Meoni	Grand Prix Roma 2013	Rome, Italy	Decision (unanimous)	5	3:00
Wins the Federkombat -75kg Muaythai title.
2013-07-05	Win	(Italy) Roman Kozac	Kombat Night VI	Genzano di Roma, Italy	KO	2	
2013-05-25	Win	(Italy) Giuseppe D'Amuri	The Night Of The Wolf 2	Taranto, Italy	KO	1	
Legend: Win Loss Draw/no contest Notes

Amateur Muay Thai & kickboxing record
Date	Result	Opponent	Event	Location	Method	Round	Time
2015-10-31	Win	(Turkey) Samet Keser	2015 WAKO World Championships, Tournament Final	Belgrade, Serbia	Decision (unanimous)	3	2:00
Wins the 2015 WAKO World Championships K-1 -86kg Gold Medal.
2015-10-30	Win	(Spain) Jonatan Dominguez Buendia	2015 WAKO World Championships, Tournament Semi Final	Belgrade, Serbia	TKO (left hook)		
2015-10-29	Win	(Bulgaria) Kristiyan Georgiev	2015 WAKO World Championships, Tournament Quarter Final	Belgrade, Serbia	Walk over		
2015-10-28	Win	(Russia) Bibola Isaev	2015 WAKO World Championships, Tournament 1/8 Final	Belgrade, Serbia	Decision (unanimous)	3	2:00
2014-10-25	Win	(Germany) Viktor Frohlich	2014 WAKO European Championships, Tournament Final	Bilbao, Spain	Decision (unanimous)	3	2:00
Wins the 2014 WAKO European Championships Full Contact -81kg Gold Medal.
2014-10-24	Win	(Ukraine) Igor Prykhodko	2014 WAKO European Championships, Tournament Semifinal	Bilbao, Spain	Decision (unanimous)	3	2:00
Legend: Win Loss Draw/no contest Notes

== Mixed rules record ==
Professional record breakdown
1 match	1 win	0 losses
By knockout	1	0
By submission	0	0
By decision	0	0

Res.	Record	Opponent	Method	Event	Date	Round	Time	Location	Notes
Win	1–0	Georgios Aposporis	KO (high kick)	THAI FIGHT Rome	April 22, 2023	1		Rome, Italy	Shoot boxe rules

== See also ==
- List of male kickboxers
