= Ignacio Capllonch =

Argentine kickboxer

- Born: 1 October 1986 (age 40); Buenos Aires, Argentina
- Height: 170 cm (5 ft 7 in)
- Weight: 57 kg (126 lb; 9 st 0 lb)
- Division: Bantamweight
- Style: Taekwondo, Kickboxing
- Stance: Orthodox
- Team: Dojo Serpiente
- Trainer: Cristian Bosch

Professional boxing record
- Total: 1
- Wins: 1

Kickboxing record
- Total: 92
- Wins: 86
- By knockout: 39
- Losses: 6
- By knockout: 3

Other information
- Boxing record from BoxRec

Ignacio Capllonch (October 1 to 1986) is the Argentine kickboxer and Muay Thai fighter, who has held World Kickboxing Network Bantamweight world titles in two styles, oriental rules and Full Contact boxing.

== Titles ==
- World Kickboxing Network
  - 2010 WKN K-1 Argentina Champion
  - 2013 WKN Oriental rules World Bantamweight Champion
  - 2015 WKN Full Contact World Super Flyweight Champion
  - 2015 WKN Oriental rules International Featherweight Champion
  - 2019 WKN Full Contact Continental Champion
- World Kickboxing League
  - 2012 WKL K-1 Argentina Bantamweight Champion
  - 2017 WKL K-1 World Featherweight Champion
- World Kickboxing Federation
  - 2010 WKF Full Contact Argentina Champion
  - 2012 WKF Argentina K-1 Featherweight Champion
  - 2014 WKF K-1 South America Champion
  - 2019 WKF Full Contact Continental Champion
- World Karate & Kickboxing Council
  - 2011 WKC Continental Champion
  - 2012 WKC Kickboxing -60 kg Champion
- International Sport Kickboxing Association
  - 2013 ISKA K-1 Argentina Champion
- Unión Argentina de Kick Boxing
  - 2010 UKA Full Contact Argentina Champion
  - 2015 UKA South America Champion
- World Association of Kickboxing Organizations
  - 2014 WAKO World Cup in Brazil K-1 -57 kg Champion

== Kickboxing record ==
Professional Muay Thai & Kickboxing record
86 Wins (39 (T)KO's), 6 Losses
Date	Result	Opponent	Event	Location	Method	Round	Time
2021-03-21	Win	(Argentina) Brian Fernandez	Bosch Tour	Buenos Aires, Argentina	Decision		
2019-11-17	Win	(Uruguay) Nicolás Berrutti	Bosch Tour	Buenos Aires, Argentina	Technical Decision (Unanimous)	8	2:00
Wins WKF Full Contact Continental title.
2019-10-13	Win	(Argentina) Ezequiel Urquiza	CHDK Kick Boxing 6º World Championship Open	Buenos Aires, Argentina	Decision	3	3:00
Wins CHDK World title.
2019-07-06	Win	(Paraguay) Junior Cristaldo	Bosch Tour	Buenos Aires, Argentina	Decision (Unanimous)	5	2:00
2019-06-09	Win	(Uruguay) Christián Pérez	Punishers 10	Buenos Aires, Argentina	Decision (Unanimous)	5	2:00
Defends Punishers title.
2018-11-17	Loss	(Thailand) Suakim PK Saenchaimuaythaigym	RISE 129	Tokyo, Japan	Decision (Unanimous)	3	3:00
2018-09-22	Win	(Brazil) Fabricio Silva	WKN "Simply the Best 22 Buenos Aires"	Buenos Aires, Argentina	Decision (Unanimous)	4	2:00
2018-08-24	Loss	(Bolivia) Renzo Martinez	WGP Kickboxing 48	Buenos Aires, Argentina	Decision (Unanimous)	3	3:00
2018-06-10	Win		Punishers 9	Buenos Aires, Argentina	Decision	5	3:00
Wins Punishers title.
2018-05-18	Win	(Brazil) Maiquel Pereira	WKN "Simply the Best 19 Buenos Aires"	Buenos Aires, Argentina	Decision	3	3:00
2018-04-14	Win	(Paraguay) Carlos Gómez	Bosch Tour	Buenos Aires, Argentina	Decision (Unanimous)	5	3:00
2017-12-15	Loss	(Brazil) Hector Santiago	WGP Kickboxing #43	Buenos Aires, Argentina	KO (Knee to the head)	4	1:10
For the WGP Kickboxing -60kg title.
2017-11-23	Loss	(Japan) Tenshin Nasukawa	RISE 121	Tokyo, Japan	TKO (Punches)	3	1:15
2017-09-15	Win	(Japan) Takanobu Sano	RISE 119	Tokyo, Japan	KO (Left hook)	2	1:22
2017-07-16	Win	(Brazil) Alex Dias	Bosch Tour	Buenos Aires, Argentina	KO (Left body kick)	1	0:35
2017-05-14	Win	(Brazil) Marco Dal Jovem	Bosch Tour	Buenos Aires, Argentina	KO (Left body kick)	3	3:00
Wins WKL K-1 World -57kg title.
2017-04-07	Win	(Chile) Felipe Bocaz	WGP Kickboxing 36, Final	São Paulo, Brazil	KO (Left body kick)	2	1:35
2017-04-07	Win	(Brazil) Ricardo Koreano	WGP Kickboxing 36, Semi Final	São Paulo, Brazil	Decision (Unanimous)	3	3:00
2016-11-13	Win	(Brazil) Bruno Caique	The Best Fighters	Buenos Aires, Argentina	Decision (Unanimous)	3	3:00
2016-09-10	Win	(Brazil) Jonathan Leuch	WGP Kickboxing 33	São Paulo, Brazil	KO (Overhand right)	1	
2016-07-31	Win	(Argentina) Ezequiel Urquiza	Bosch Tour	Buenos Aires, Argentina	Decision	3	3:00
2016-05-08	Win	(Brazil) Bruno Deminski	The Best Fighters 2	Buenos Aires, Argentina	KO (Left body kick)	1	
2016-03-25	Win	(Paraguay) Ariel Villalba	Bosch Tour	Buenos Aires, Argentina	KO (Left body kick)	1	2:10
2015-11-08	Win	(Brazil) Leonardo Daldegan		José C. Paz, Argentina	KO (Right cross)	4	
Wins UKA South America title.
2015-10-09	Win	(Brazil) Alexandre Silva	WKN "Simply the Best 7 Caseros"	Caseros, Buenos Aires, Argentina	KO (Punch)	1	
Wins WKN International Featherweight title.
2015-06-13	Win	(France) Jerome Ardissone		Nice, France	TKO (Doctor stoppage)	6	
Wins WKN Full Contact World -55kg title.
2015-05-18	Win	(Argentina) Cesar Benitez	Punishers	Lanus, Argentina	Decision (Unanimous)	5	3:00
2015-02-28	Loss	(United States) German Baltazar	WCK at Casino Morongo	Los Angeles, California United States	Decision (Majority)	3	3:00
2014-12-19	Win	(Argentina) Cesar Benitez	WKN Simply the Best 2 Caseros	Caseros, Buenos Aires, Argentina	TKO (Right cross)	3	1:25
2014-09-27	Loss	(Brazil) Paulo Tebar	WGP Kickboxing 22, Final	São Paulo, Brazil	KO (High kick)	2	2:15
For the WGP Kickboxing -60kg title.
2014-09-27	Win	(Brazil) Rafael Araujo	WGP Kickboxing 22, Semi Final	São Paulo, Brazil	Decision (Unanimous)	3	3:00
2014-06-06	Win	(Argentina) Ezequiel Urquiza		Buenos Aires, Argentina	KO (High kick)	2	1:30
2014-05-18	Win	(Brazil) Thiago Silva		Buenos Aires, Argentina	KO (Right cross)	1	
Wins W.K.F K-1 South America title.
2014-04-11	Win	(Argentina) Maximiliano Luna		Argentina	Decision (Majority)	3	3:00
2013-12-06	Win	(Argentina) Javier Cochea Garay		Argentina	KO (Left body kick)	1	
2013-10-04	Win	(Brazil) Cledison Pereira	WKN Kickboxing	Argentina	KO (Knee to the head)	2	
Wins WKN Oriental rules World -55kg title.
2013-09-13	Win	(Argentina) Gaston Gomez	Norte vs Sur	Buenos Aires, Argentina	KO (Low kicks)	3	
2013-08-23	Win	(Argentina) Lautaro Domenichelli		Caseros, Buenos Aires, Argentina	Decision	3	3:00
Wins ISKA K-1 Argentina title.
2013-07-14	Win	(Brazil) Lucas Pereira	Club Liniers	Buenos Aires, Argentina	TKO (Corner stoppage/Low kicks)	2	
2013-06-14	Win	(Brazil) Eduardo Vieira		Buenos Aires, Argentina	TKO (Jump spinning back kick)	1	
2013-05-12	Win	(Argentina) Christian Nieto	Club Liniers	Buenos Aires, Argentina	KO (Punches)	1	
Defends WKF Argentina K-1 -60kg title.
2013-03-09	Win	(Argentina) Ariel Delgado		Argentina	Decision	3	3:00
2012-12-14	Win	(Argentina) Gonzalo Diaz		San Salvador de Jujuy, Argentina	Decision (Unanimous)	3	2:00
2012-10-27	Win	(Argentina) Enzo Nahuel		Buenos Aires, Argentina	Decision (Unanimous)	3	3:00
2012-09-14	Win	(Argentina) Gonzalo Diaz		San Salvador de Jujuy, Argentina	Decision (Unanimous)	3	2:00
2012-08-25	Win	(Argentina) Enzo Nahuel		Bahía Blanca, Argentina	Decision	3	3:00
Wins WKL K-1 Argentina title.
2012-08-10	Win	(Argentina) Gaston Gomez		San Francisco, Córdoba, Argentina	KO (Low kick)	2	
2012-06-29	Win	(Bolivia) Miguel Canido	La Última Batalla, Final	Santa Cruz de la Sierra, Bolivia	Decision (Majority)	3	3:00
2012-06-29	Win	(Bolivia) Mauricio Guevara	La Última Batalla, Semi Final	Santa Cruz de la Sierra, Bolivia	Decision (Unanimous)	3	3:00
2012-06-10	Win	(Argentina) Christian Nieto	Club Liniers	Buenos Aires, Argentina	Decision (Unanimous)	4	3:00
Wins WKF Argentina K-1 -60kg title.
2012-05-19	Win	(Mexico) Romel Gutierrez	FIGHTER	Buenos Aires, Argentina	TKO (Low kicks)	2	3:00
Wins WKC Kickboxing -60kg title.
2012-04-01	Win	(Argentina) Juan Da Silva	Club de la Pelea	Argentina	KO (Punches)	2	
2011-12-16	Win	(Argentina) Cesar Romero	WGP Kickboxing 22, Semi Final	Argentina	TKO (Punches & kicks)	2	0:20
2011-11-13	Win	(Argentina) Lautaro Domenichelli	PUNISHERS	Argentina	TKO (Knees)	2	
Wins W.K.F Argentina title.
2011-10-15	Win	(Argentina) Gaston Gomez		Río Gallegos, Argentina	KO (Low kick)	1	
2011-09-18	Win	(Argentina) Sebastian Calvo		Argentina	Decision	3	3:00
2011-08-27	Win	(Argentina) Leonel Carreras		San Francisco, Córdoba, Argentina	KO (Low kicks)	2	
Wins Argentina Cobra Thai title.
2011-08-13	Win	(Argentina) Ariel Arias		Argentina	Decision (Unanimous)	3	2:00
2011-07-15	Win	(Argentina) Joaquin Ibanez		Argentina	TKO (Low kicks)	2	
Wins WKC Continental title.
2011-05-29	Win	(Brazil) Gerardo Dos Santos	Club Pedro Echague	Buenos Aires, Argentina	Decision	3	3:00
2011-05-15	Win	(Brazil) Valdair Branco		Argentina	KO (Left hook to the body)	1	
2011-04-09	Win	(Argentina) Roberto Fernandez		Río Gallegos, Argentina	KO (High kick)	1	
2010-12-19	Win	(Argentina) Marcelo Mendieta	Club Argentino De Castelar	Castelar, Argentina	Decision	5	3:00
Wins Argentina Cobra Thai title.
2010-11-20	Win	(Argentina) Marcelo Mendieta	Club Argentino De Castelar	Buenos Aires, Argentina	KO (High kick)	1	
Wins WKN K-1 Argentina title.
2010-10-31	Win	(Argentina) Dario Coria		Castelar, Argentina	Decision		
Wins UKA Full Contact Argentina title.
2010-10-08	Win	(Argentina) Roberto Fernandez		Córdoba, Argentina	KO (Low kick)	1	
2010-07-18	Win	(Argentina) Dario Coria		Argentina	Decision	3	3:00
2010-06-04	Win	(Argentina) Gonzalo Cortabarria		Cordoba, Argentina	TKO (Corner stoppage)	1	
2010-05-16	Win	(Brazil) Edmilson Pereira	Club Platense	Argentina	TKO	3	
2010-05-08	Win	(Argentina) Luis Arandia		José C. Paz, Argentina	TKO (Doctor stoppage)	1	
2010-04-19	Win	(Argentina) Nahuel Arias	Warriors	Argentina	Decision	3	3:00
2010-03-	Win	(Uruguay) Maxi Pereira		Argentina	KO (High kick)	1	
2010-02-14	Win	(Argentina) Federico Devesa		Argentina	Decision		
Wins WKF Full Contact Argentina title.
2010-01-23	Win	(Argentina) Jorge Fojo	KICKBOXING W.K.N.	Miramar, Buenos Aires, Argentina	KO (Low kick)	3	
Legend: Win Loss Draw/No contest Notes

Amateur Kickboxing record
Date	Result	Opponent	Event	Location	Method	Round	Time
2014-08-17	Win	(Brazil) Claudio Dalla Rosa	2014 WAKO World Cup in Brazil, Final	São Paulo, Brazil	Decision	3	3:00
Wins 2014 WAKO World Cup in Brazil K-1 -57kg Gold Medal.
2014-08-17	Win	(Brazil) Daniel Mattos	2014 WAKO World Cup in Brazil, Semi Final	São Paulo, Brazil	Decision	3	3:00
Legend: Win Loss Draw/No contest Notes

== Karate Combat record ==
Professional record breakdown
1 match	0 wins	1 loss
By decision	0	1

Res.	Record	Opponent	Method	Event	Date	Round	Time	Location	Notes
Loss	0–1	Gabriel Stankunas	Decision (unanimous)	Karate Combat 39	May 20, 2023	4	3:00	Miami, Florida, United States	
