= Waltershausen =

- Town
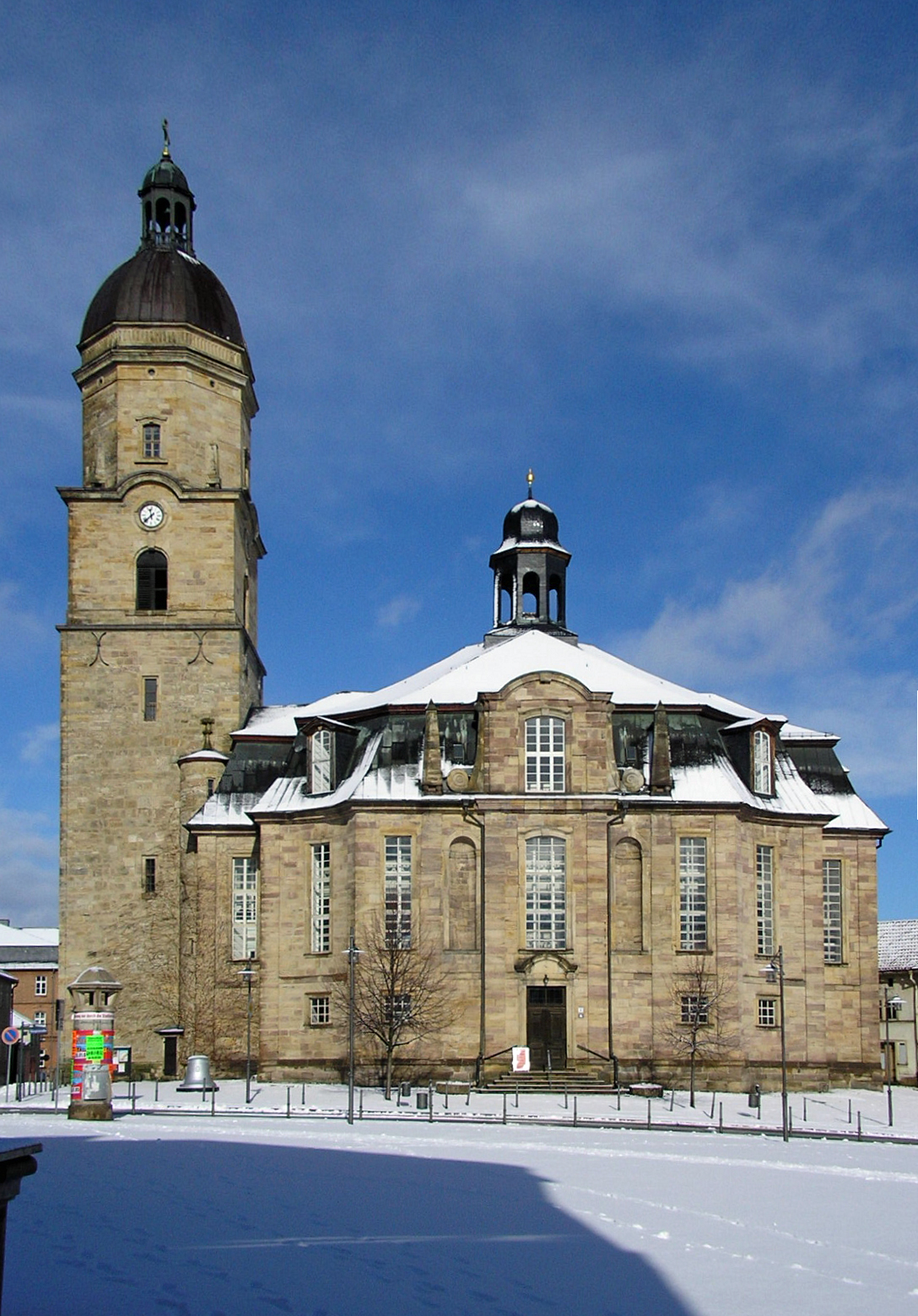

- Coat of arms

- Location of Waltershausen within Gotha district
- Interactive map of Waltershausen
- Location within Germany Location within Thuringia
- Coordinates: 50°53′51″N 10°33′21″E
- Country: Germany
- State: Thuringia
- District: Gotha

Government
  - Mayor (2024–30): Leon Graupner

Area
  - Total: 60.62 km^{2} (23.41 sq mi)
- Elevation: 320 m (1,050 ft)

Population (2025-12-31)
  - Total: 12,871
  - Density: 212.3/km^{2} (549.9/sq mi)
- Time zone: UTC+01:00 (CET)
  - Summer (DST): UTC+02:00 (CEST)
- Postal codes: 99880
- Dialling codes: 03622
- Vehicle registration: GTH
- Website: www.waltershausen.de

Waltershausen (German pronunciation: [valtɐsˈhaʊzn̩]) is a town in the south-western part of the district of Gotha in the state of Thuringia, Germany.

== Geography ==
=== Geographic location ===
Located on the verge of the Thuringian Basin just before the Thuringian Forest, Waltershausen is sometimes referred to as the "gate to the Thuringian Forest".

It is close to the Großer Inselsberg, the fourth-highest mountain in the state.

=== Town structure ===
The town is divided into the seven districts of Fischbach, Schmerbach, Schwarzhausen, Winterstein, Wahlwinkel, Schnepfenthal and Langenhain.

=== Incorporations ===
On July 1, 1950, Langenhain, Schnepfenthal-Rödichen as well as Wahlwinkel became parts of Waltershausen. 63 years later, on December 31, 2013, the district of Emsetal (consisting of Fischbach, Schmerbach, Schwarzhausen and Winterstein) was incorporated into the town.

== History ==
The origin of the town's name can be traced back to the 8th-9th century when, during Franconian times, a settlement called Waltershausen existed. In 1167, the town's landmark Tenneberg Castle was first mentioned in a document.

The first documentary mention of Waltershausen itself dates back to 1209, precisely under the name of „Ulricus, villicius de Waltherißhusin“. It was then a part of the county of Mühlburg under the electorate of Mainz. From 1640 onwards, Waltershausen, then a subordinate to the Amt Tenneberg, became a part of the duchy of Saxe-Coburg and Gotha.

In the early nineteenth century, Waltershausen established its tradition of being a "city of dolls" due to the high number of toy and specifically doll factories in the area. In 1990, however, the industrial production of dolls came to an end.

In 1929, the Thuringian forest railway was extended to Waltershausen, thus providing a direct connection to Bad Tabarz and Gotha.

During World War II, on February 6, 1945, Waltershausen was among several regional towns to be hit by an attack of U.S. Forces. 12 bombers dropped a total of 120 bombs on the town, causing the destruction of 21 buildings as well as 20 casualties.

== Culture ==
=== Landmarks and sights ===
- Schloss Tenneberg, a baroque castle along with a local history museum.
- Klaustor, the main gate of the former city wall.
- Töpfersturm (German for pottery tower), the former workplace of medieval potters outside of the town's center.
- historic Townhall, built in 1441 and fundamentally restored in 1990, the second oldest half-timbered town hall in central Germany.
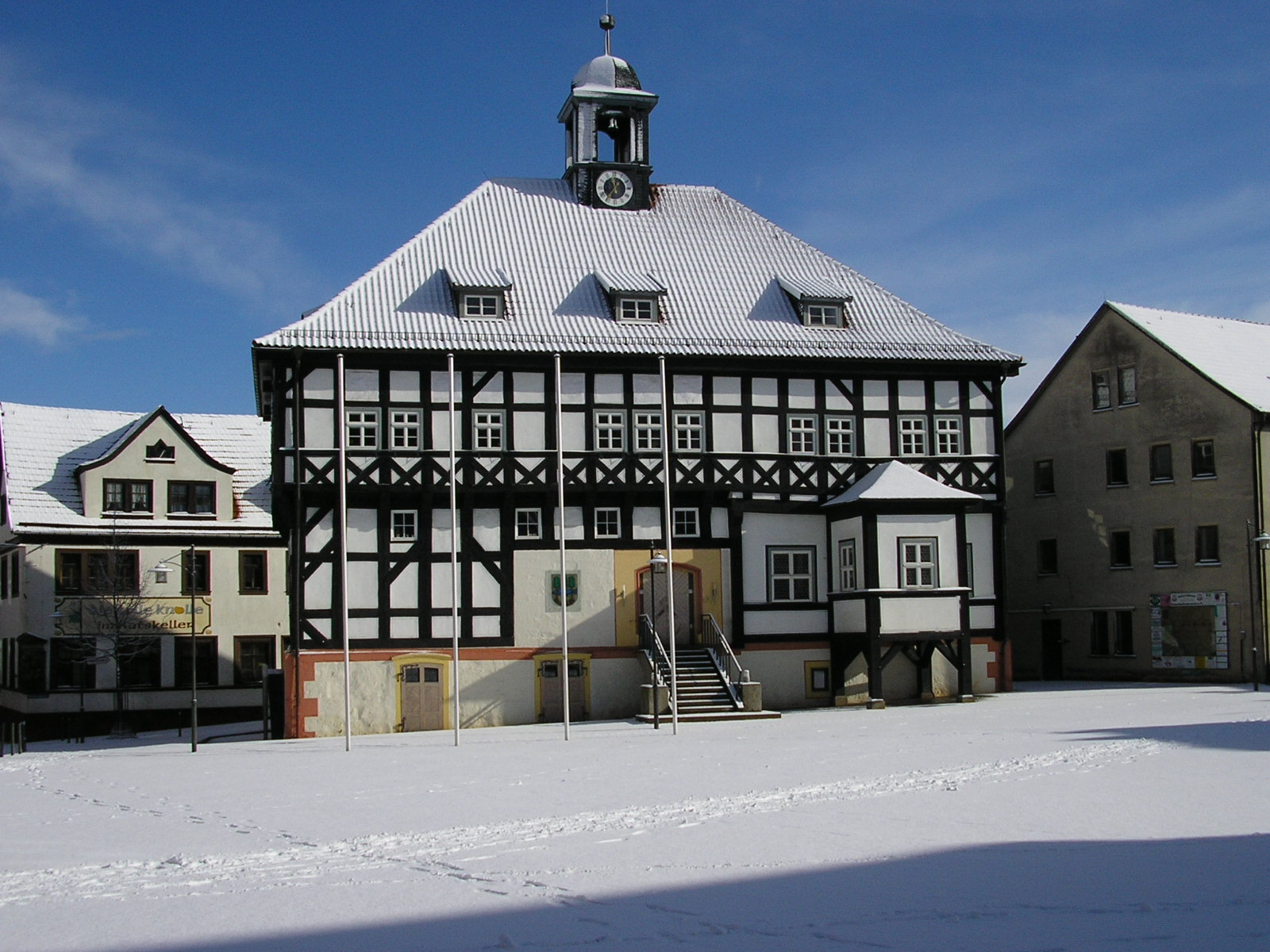
  Town hall
- Schnepfenthal Salzmann School (Salzmannschule Schnepfenthal), a boarding school specializing in foreign language education.
- the first outdoor gymnastic ground of Germany, founded by Johann Christoph Friedrich GutsMuths.
- town church (1719–23), including the largest baroque organ in the state of Thuringia.

=== Sports ===
Waltershausen offers a variety of sports clubs competing on high levels. Karate athletes of Bushido Waltershausen regularly compete on the national and international stage and have won numerous titles over the years. The town is also a well-known host of regional as well as national table tennis competitions. Its central sports club, ZSG Waltershausen consists of 12 different sports departments.

=== Media ===
There are two renowned radio stations in Waltershausen. In 2009, the online radio channel 0800 Radio Tenneberg went on air with daily coverage. Four years later, TMR-radio.de launched, providing recent news and a variety of music.

=== Recurring events ===
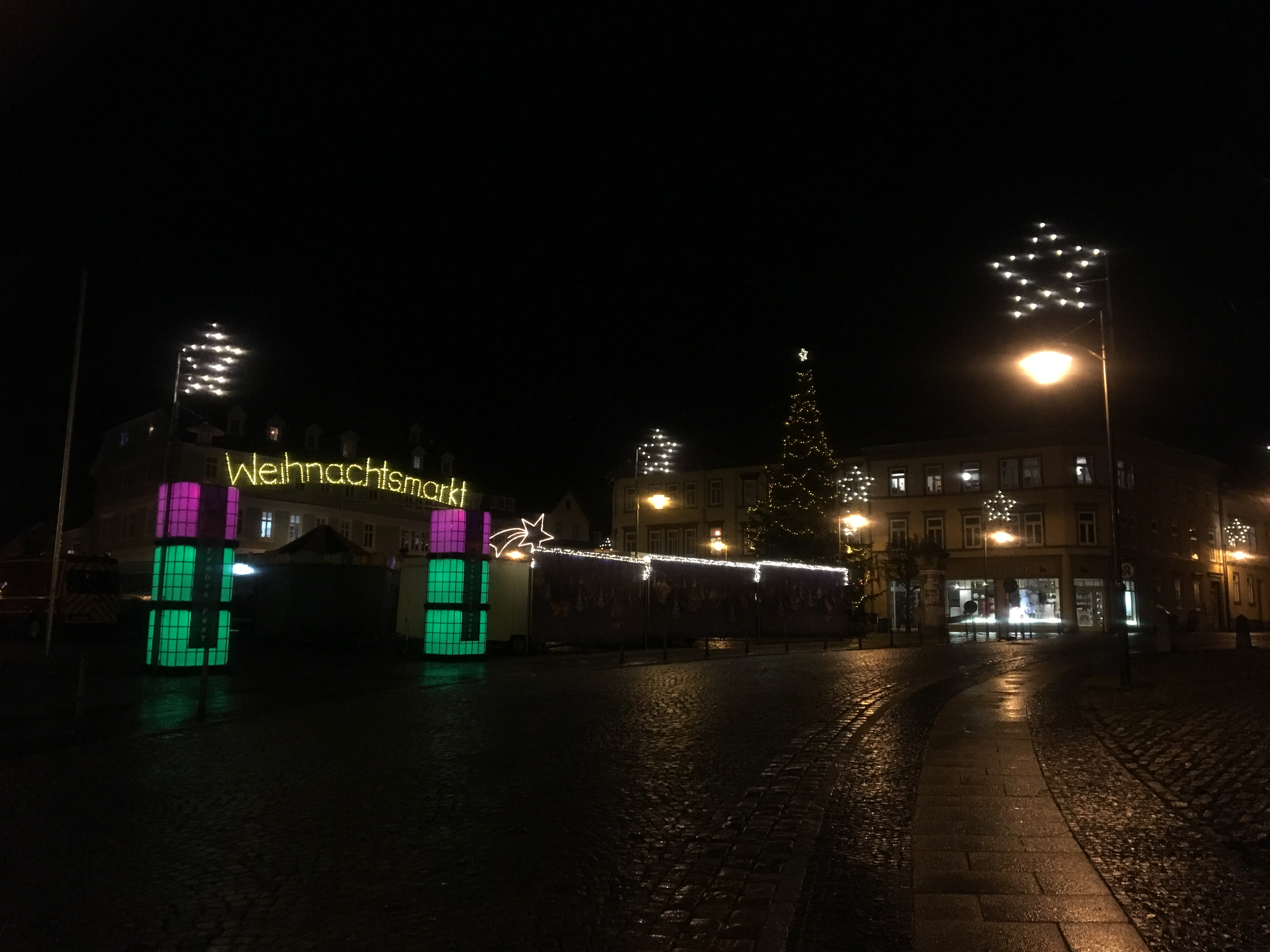
Waltershausen's Christmas market

The town's biggest event is the annual town fair, taking place in mid-July under a different motto each year. Another recurring event is the medieval castle fair at the beginning of each September.

In December, usually on the weekend of second advent, the annual Christmas market takes place in front of the town hall. A day before Carnival's Monday, a traditional Carnival's parade has been held in Waltershausen for over 25 years.

=== Religion ===
There are a total of seven churches and chapels in Waltershausen and its surrounding districts. With the exception of a Catholic chapel established during the 20th century in the town, all of the religious institutions are of Protestant Christianity.

In 1993, Waltershausen became an ecclesiastical administrative center as chair of the Protestant-Lutheran church association of Waltershausen-Ohrdruf.

== Infrastructure ==
=== Industry ===
The local economy is highly dependent on its industrial institutions. There are several companies located in or around Waltershausen. One of the most significant examples is a factory by Hako GmbH, where multifunctional equipment transporters called Multicars are being produced.

Rockinger, a trailer hitch producing company, has a factory as well as its headquarters in the town. ContiTech, a subsidiary of Continental, also settled in Waltershausen with one of its factories.

=== Public transport ===
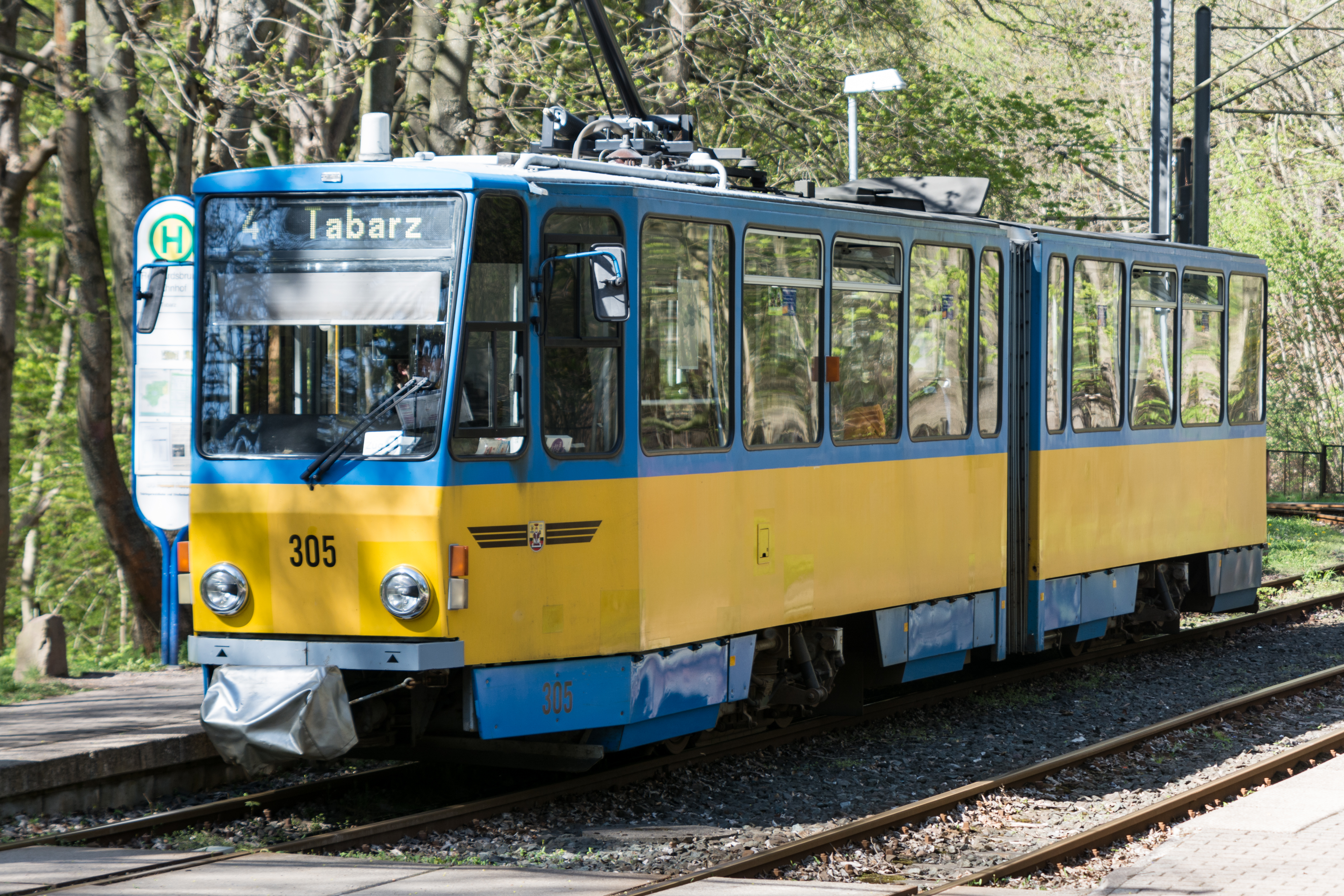
Thüringer Waldbahn

Due to its proximity to the highway A4 and its own entry to one of Germany's most significant highways connecting Frankfurt and Dresden, Waltershausen is well-connected to the surrounding cities of Eisenach, Gotha as well as Erfurt. The highway is also the gateway to various other parts of Germany, making Waltershausen a very central and easily accessible place from a national perspective.

One of the best-known public transport mediums in the area is the Thüringer Waldbahn, connecting Waltershausen to Gotha and Bad Tabarz. Its traditional and nostalgic concept have made it popular beyond the town's border, attracting even non-local tourists.

There are buses and a train line operating in Waltershausen as well.

=== Education ===
Waltershausen currently has two primary schools, a secondary school as well as the Salzmannschule Schnepfenthal, a high school focussing on foreign language education.

== External relations ==
=== Sister cities ===
International:

- Bruay-sur-l'Escaut, France (Département Nord) (since 1965)
- Wolbrom, Poland (Voivodship Małopolskie) (since 2000)

National:

- Korbach, Germany (Hesse) (since 1990)
- Hanau, Germany (Hesse) (since 1990)

== Notable people ==
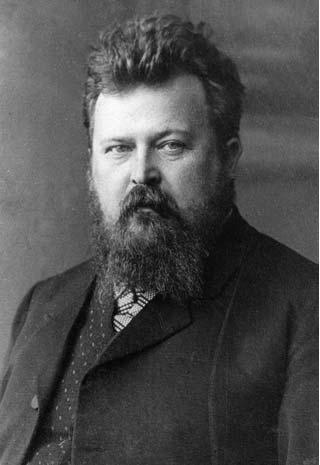
Hans Kehr in 1902

- Johann Matthäus Bechstein (1757–1822), naturalist, forestry scientist and ornithologist
- Heinrich Credner (1809–1876), geologist
- Eduard Ausfeld (1850–1906), historian
- Paul Fridolin Kehr (1860–1944), historian and diplomatist, brother of Hans Kehr
- Hans Kehr (1862–1916), founder of the German bile duct surgery, brother of Paul Fridolin Kehr
- Jannes Fittje (born 1999), racing driver
