= Cristian Bosch =

Argentinian kickboxer

- Born: Buenos Aires, Argentina
- Nationality: Argentina
- Height: 1.91 m (6 ft 3 in)
- Weight: 91 kg (201 lb; 14.3 st)
- Division: Heavyweight; Cruiserweight
- Style: Kickboxing, Muay Thai
- Stance: Orthodox
- Fighting out of: Argentina
- Team: Dojo Serpiente

Other information
- Notable students: Tomás Aguirre; Ignacio Capllonch

Cristian Bosch is an Argentinian kickboxer. He is the former WBC Muaythai Heavyweight World Champion and WKN Cruiserweight World Champion.

== Early life ==
Bosh started training martial arts the age of 15. He also worked as a security guard.

== Career ==
On April 2, 2011, Bosch defeated Raúl Romero by knockout by a right cross in the first round after 20 seconds in Mexico City. Bosh captured the vacant WBC Muaythai Heavyweight World Championship.

In 2012, Bosch was scheduled to fight Igor Jurković for the WBC Muaythai championship, but the fight didn't materialize because Jurković was also scheduled to fight in the Glory summer tournament in Ukraine. In an interview, Jurković said that he was sorry he couldn't fight for the belt.

On June 9, 2012, Bosch fought Fabiano Aoki, who was replacing Igor Jurković as challenger for the WBC Muaythai Heavyweight World Championship. Aoki dominated the fight and knocked out Bosch in the 2nd round via jumping right knee. The bane of the event was Singha Battle For The Belts event and was held at the Impact Exhibition and Convention Center in Bangkok, Thailand.

On August 4, 2013, Bosch attempted to defend his WKN Cruiserweight Championship against French kickboxer Corentin Jallon in Buenos Aires, Argentina. The first round started well as Jallon received some heavy damage from the champion, resulting in two standing 8 counts. In the third round, Jallon landed an elbow on Bosch's face, and won the match via knockout.

On December 19, 2014, in the main event, the Brazilian Alessandro Benacci and Bosch for WKN World cruiserweight title under Oriental rules kickboxing. The event was aired live on FOX Sports Latin America, followed by the delayed broadcast throughout Europe by SFR Sport 5. Bosch knocked out Benacci to take WKN Cruiserweight World title.

In 2016, Bosch was ranked #7 in world in the WBC Muaythai Heavyweight rankings.

== Personal life ==
Bosch is now retired and teaches seminars. He is the head coach at Dojo Serpiente in Argentina and he is the World Kickboxing Network Continental Director for Latin America.

== Championships and accomplishments ==
- WBC Muaythai
  - WBC Muaythai Heavyweight World Championship
- World Kickboxing Network
  - WKN Cruiserweight World Championship
  - WKN Heavyweight World Championship
  - WKN South American Title
  - WKN K-1 Argentina Champion

== Kickboxing record ==
Professional kickboxing record
41 fights, 36 wins (28 KO/TKO), 4 losses, 1 draw
Date	Result	Opponent	Event	Location	Method	Round	Time
2021-12-18	Win	(Italy) Giorgio Muccini	La Nuit des Challenges 20	Saint-Fons, France	TKO (Referee stoppage)	1	
Lost the WBC Muaythai Heavyweight World title
2014-12-19	Win	(Brazil) Alessandro Benacci	Simply the Best 2 Caseros: Bosch vs. Benacci	Buenos Aires, Argentina	KO	4	
Wins the WKN Cruiserweight World Championship
2013-10-04	Loss	(France) Corentin Jallon	Cedem de Caseros	Buenos Aires, Argentina	KO	3	
Lost the WKN Cruiserweight World Championship
2012-06-09	Loss	(Brazil) Fabiano Aoki	Singha Battle For The Belts	Bangkok, Thailand	KO (jumping knee)	2	2:28
Lost the WBC Muaythai Heavyweight World title
2011-04-02	Win	(Mexico) Raúl Romero	Singha Battle For The Belts	Mexico City, Mexico	KO	2	2:28
Wins the WBC Muaythai Heavyweight World title
2009-12-11	Win	(Republic of Ireland) Massimo Barone	WKN Argentina: Buenos Aires Fight Night	Buenos Aires, Argentina	KO	1	2:20
Wins the WKN Cruiserweight World Championship
2008-10-24	Win	(Chile) Jean Valdez	WKN Argentina: Buenos Aires Fight Night	Buenos Aires, Argentina	KO	1	2:20
Wins the WKN South American Championship
Legend: Win Loss Draw/No contest Notes

== Mixed martial arts record ==
Res.	Record	Opponent	Method	Event	Date	Round	Time	Location	Notes
Win	1-0	Christian Leon Zamudio	TKO (Punches)	AF - Argento Fight	January 28, 2013	1	0:18	Buenos Aires, Argentina	
