= Emsetal =

- Municipality
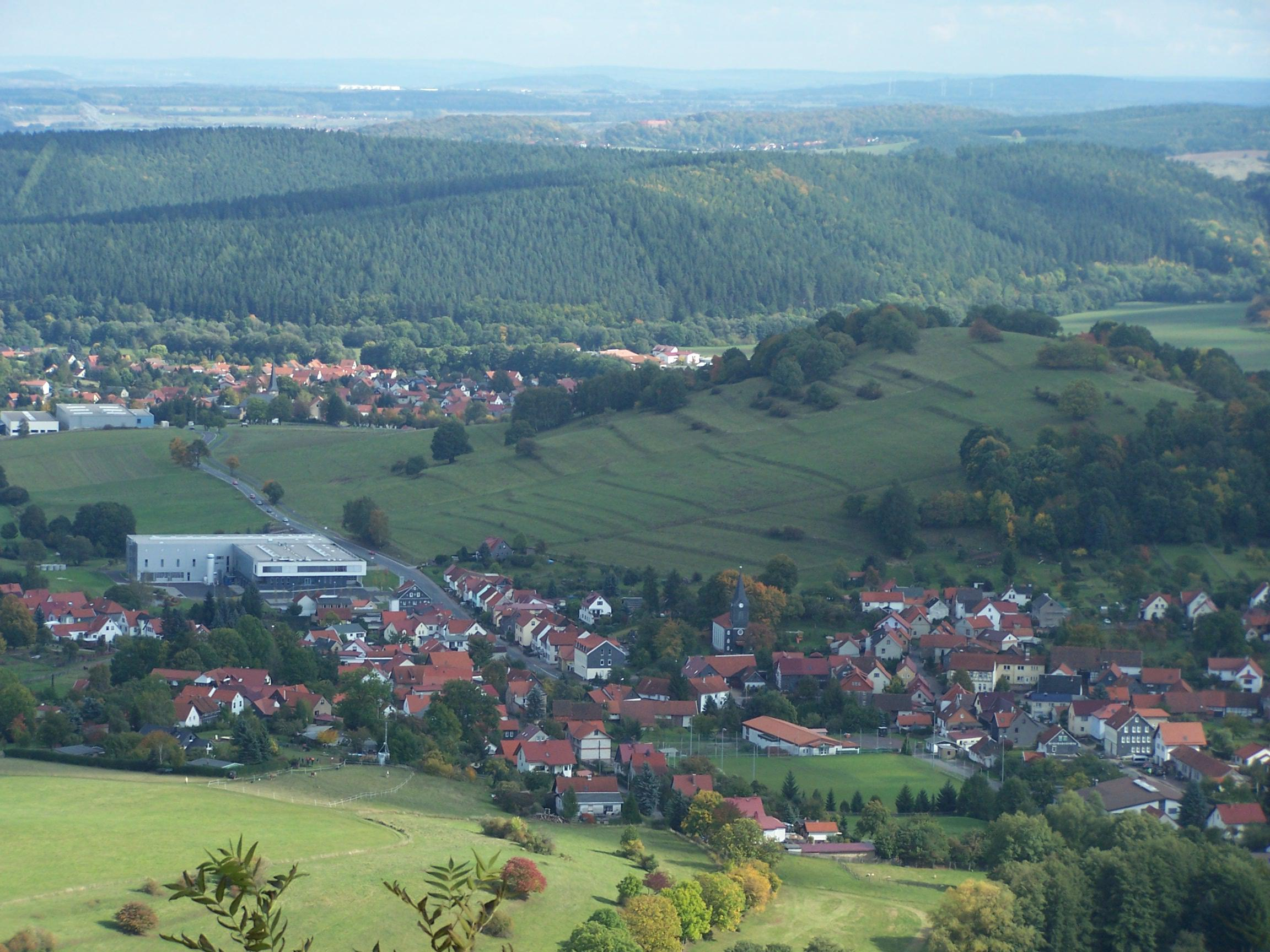
- Emsetal
- Interactive map of Emsetal
- Location within Germany Location within Thuringia
- Coordinates: 50°53′1″N 10°27′22″E
- Country: Germany
- State: Thuringia
- District: Gotha
- Disbanded: 2013

Area
  - Total: 29.87 km^{2} (11.53 sq mi)
- Elevation: 375 m (1,230 ft)

Population (2012-12-31)
  - Total: 2,821
  - Density: 94.44/km^{2} (244.6/sq mi)
- Time zone: UTC+01:00 (CET)
  - Summer (DST): UTC+02:00 (CEST)
- Postal codes: 99891
- Dialling codes: 036259
- Vehicle registration: GTH

Emsetal (German pronunciation: [ˈɛmzəˌtaːl], lit. 'Emse Valley') is a former municipality in the district of Gotha, in Thuringia, Germany. It took its name from the river Emse. It consisted of the villages Fischbach, Schmerbach, Schwarzhausen and Winterstein. On 31 December 2013, it was merged into the town Waltershausen.

The Kilianstein is an unusual rock pinnacle in the municipality that is sometimes used by climbers. It is 800 m east of the village of Winterstein.
