= Gaylord Montier =

French male kickboxer

- Born: 4 April 1986 (age 40); Oise, France
- Nationality: French
- Height: 1.62 m (5 ft 4 in)
- Weight: 55 kg (121 lb; 8 st 9 lb)
- Division: Flyweight
- Style: Kickboxing
- Fighting out of: Bruay-sur-l'Escaut, France
- Team: Team Hallouane
- Years active: 2008 - present

Kickboxing record
- Total: 20
- Wins: 13
- By knockout: 4
- Losses: 7
- By knockout: 2

Gaylord Montier (born 4 April 1986) is a French Muay thai fighter. He is the current WKN World Featherweight Kickboxing champion and the former ISKA World Bantamweight and WAKO European Flyweight champion.

== Muay Thai career ==
In December 2011, he fought Thepsutin for the WPMF World Super Bantamweight title. Montier lost the fight by decision.

Montier came back after a two-year absence from the sport, and defeated Thibaud Duphil by decision during Warrior's Night. He fought Ivano Siviero during Le Choc Des Mondes, and won the bout by a second-round TKO.

In 2015, Gaylord fought Tukatatong Sor Kiatniwat for the ISKA World Bantamweight Muaythai title. He won the fight by decision.

In 2016, Montier fought only once, against Wuthichai. He won the fight by unanimous decision.

Montier was scheduled to fight Muangsee Pumpanmuang during Choc Des Mondes for the vacant WKN World Featherweight Kickboxing title. Montier knocked Muangsee out in the third round.

== Championships and accomplishments ==
- 2009 WAKO European Flyweight Champion
- 2015 ISKA World Bantamweight Muaythai Champion
- 2018 WKN World Featherweight Kickboxing Champion

== Fight record ==
Professional Kickboxing Record
13 Wins (4 (T)KO's), 7 Losses, 0 Draw, 0 No Contest
Date	Result	Opponent	Event	Location	Method	Round	Time
2018-6-2	Win	(Thailand) Muangsee Pumpanmuang	Choc Des Mondes	Caudry, France	KO	3	
Wins the WKN World Featherweight title.
2016-5-13	Win	(Thailand) Wuthichai	Partouche Kickboxing Tour 2016	Saint-Amand-les-Eaux, France	Decision (Unanimous)	3	3:00
2015-4-11	Win	(Thailand) Tukatatong Sor Kiatniwat	Choc Des Mondes	Caudry, France	Decision (Unanimous)	5	3:00
Wins the ISKA World Bantamweight title.
2014-6-7	Win	(Italy) Ivano Siviero	Le Choc Des Mondes	Bruay-sur-l'Escaut, France	TKO	2	
2014-4-4	Win	(France) Thibaud Duphil	Warriors Night	Paris, France	Decision (Unanimous)	3	3:00
2012-3-24	Loss	(France) Amine Kacem	Choc Des Mondes VII	Bruay-sur-l'Escaut, France	Decision (Unanimous)	5	3:00
For the WAKO World Bantamweight title.
2012-2-11	Win	(France) Amine Zitouni	Choc Des Mondes VII	Oberkorn, Luxembourg	Decision (Unanimous)	3	3:00
2011-12-4	Loss	(Thailand) Thepsutin	King's Birthday	Pattaya, Thailand	Decision (Unanimous)	5	3:00
For the WPMF World Super Bantamweight title.
2011-11-26	Win	(Tunisia) Tarek Krab	La soirée des revanches	Roncq, France	Decision (Unanimous)	3	3:00
2011-3-26	Win	(United Kingdom) Paulo Da Silva	Le Choc des Mondes VI	Bruay-sur-l'Escaut, France	Decision (Unanimous)	3	3:00
2010-4-10	Win	(Tunisia) Tarek Krab	Le Choc des Mondes V	Bruay-sur-l'Escaut, France	Decision (Unanimous)	3	3:00
2010-3-28	Loss	(Thailand) Sayannoi Lookhuetanon	France VS Thaïlande	Reims, France	Decision (Unanimous)	3	3:00
2009-10-31	Loss	(Tunisia) Tarek Kreb	Who's The Best	Charleroi, Belgium	DQ	2	
For the WFCA European 56 kg title.
2009-6-27	Loss	(Thailand) Sitthichai Khomahae	La Nuit des Gladiateurs	Saint-Nazaire, France	TKO	2	
2009-5-2	Win	(Thailand) Artit Shapadit	France VS Thaïlande	Epinal, France	Decision (Unanimous)	3	3:00
2009-4-18	Win	(France) Mohamed Bouchareb	Le Choc des Mondes IV	Bruay-sur-l'Escaut, France	KO	5	
For the WAKO World Flyweight title.
2009-2-28	Win	(France) Amine Zitouni	La Nuit Du Siam 5	Houplines, France	Decision (Unanimous)	3	3:00
2008-12-20	Win	(Belgium) AbdelOuahab Yalmani	Le Choc des Mondes IV	Bruay-sur-l'Escaut, France	KO	2	
2008-6-22	Loss	(France) Said Youb	Gala Kun Khmer - Muaythai	Vieux-Condé, France	Decision (Unanimous)	5	3:00
For the FBTMTDA 55 kg title.
2008-4-12	Loss	(France) Mohamed Bouchareb	Le Choc des Mondes III	Saint-Amand-les-Eaux, France	KO	4	
Legend: Win Loss Draw/No contest Notes

== See also ==
- List of male kickboxers
