= Sračinec =

- Municipality
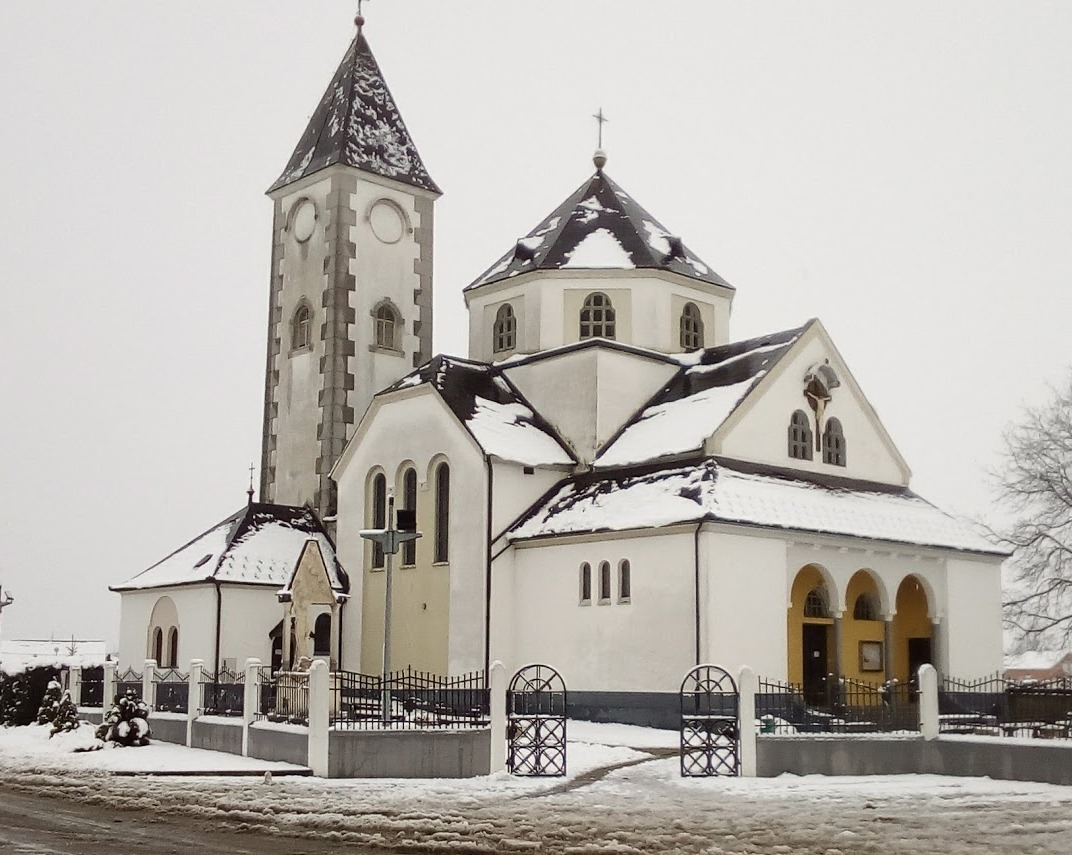

- Location of Sračinec in Croatia
- Coordinates: 46°19′46″N 16°16′44″E
- Country: Croatia
- County: Varaždin County

Government
  - Municipal mayor: Božidar Novoselec (HNS)

Area
  - Municipality: 23.5 km^{2} (9.1 sq mi)
  - Urban: 10.1 km^{2} (3.9 sq mi)

Population (2021)
  - Municipality: 4,678
  - Density: 199/km^{2} (516/sq mi)
  - Urban: 3,807
  - Urban density: 377/km^{2} (976/sq mi)
- Time zone: UTC+1 (CET)
  - Summer (DST): UTC+2 (CEST)
- Postal code: 42000 Varaždin
- Area code: +385 (0)42
- Website: sracinec.hr

Sračinec is a village and municipality in Croatia in Varaždin county. According to the 2011 census, there are 4,842 inhabitants, an absolute majority of which are Croats. The municipality includes the following settlements:

- Sračinec, population 3,897
- Svibovec Podravski, population 945

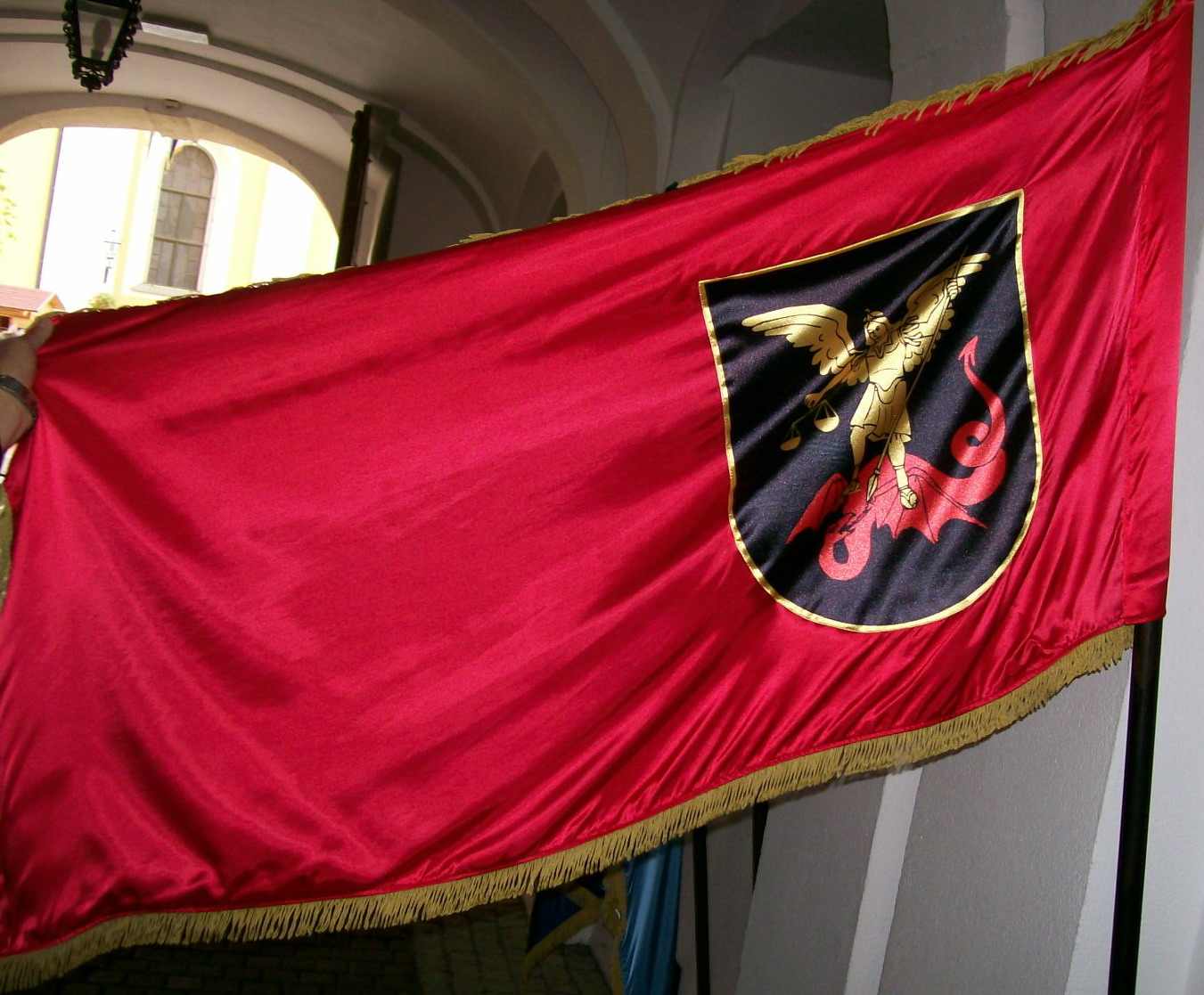
Flag of the municipality of Sračinec
