= Schwarzhausen =

Village in Thuringia, Germany

Coordinates: 50°54′N 10°28′E

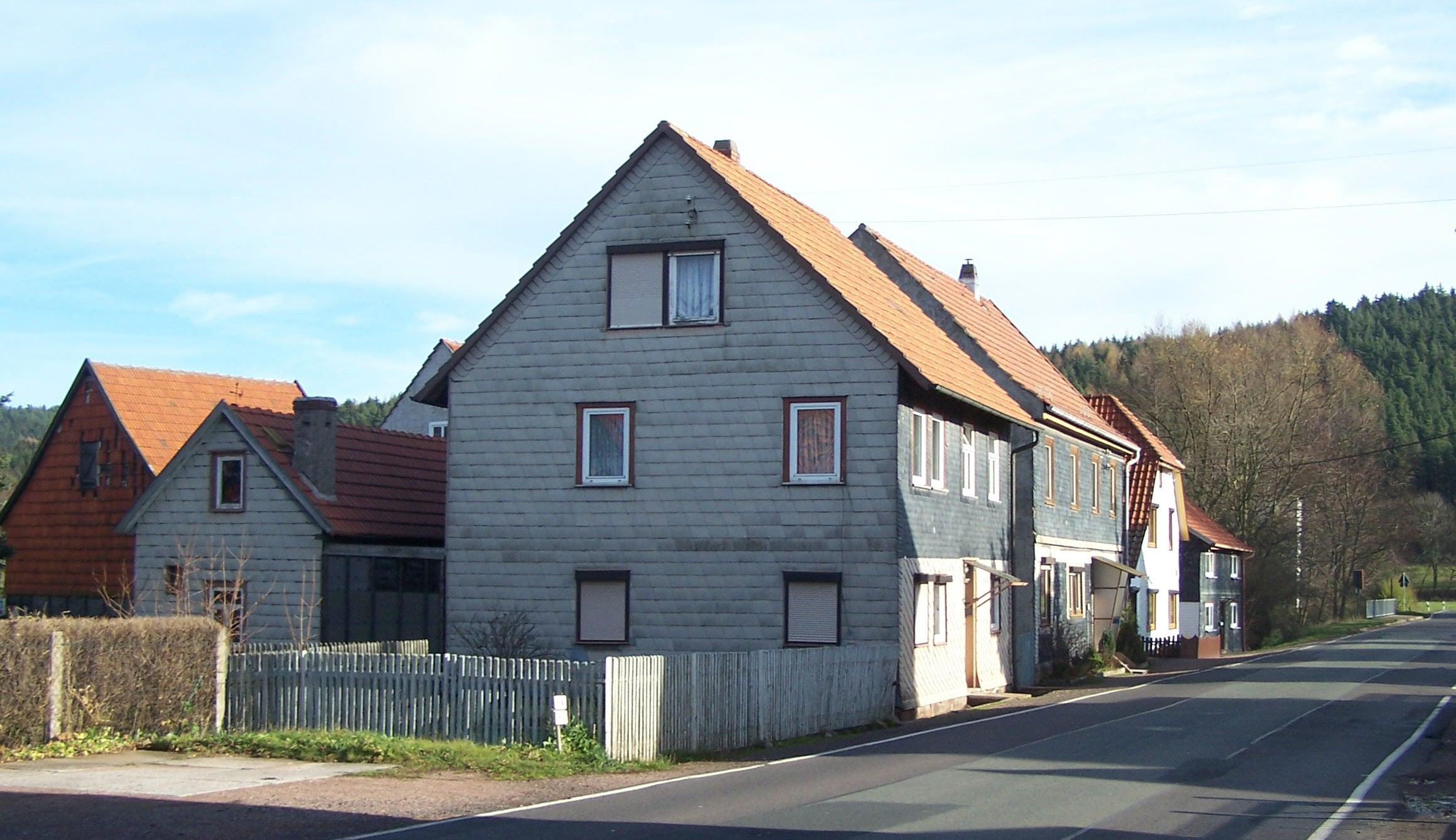

Schwarzhausen (German pronunciation: [ʃvaʁtsˈhaʊzn̩]) is a village in Thuringia, Germany. In 1946, it was incorporated into the municipality of Emsetal in the district of Gotha.

== Geography ==
Schwarzhausen is located on the northeast edge of the Thuringian Forest at an altitude of about 320 to 360 meters in the Emse valley.

== References in literature ==
Schwarzhausen was a major place setting for the early plot in Moderne Deutsche Sprachlehre, an English-German language book.

== Sources ==
Horst H. Müller: Reisehandbuch Thüringer Wald und Randgebiete (1977) S. 635 f.
