= Siniša Kovačić =

Croatian kickboxer (born 1977)

- Born: Siniša Kovačić; 3 August 1977 (age 49); Varaždin, Croatia
- Other names: Pit Bull
- Nationality: Croatian
- Height: 1.68 m (5 ft 6 in)
- Weight: 60 kg (132 lb; 9 st 6 lb)
- Style: Kickboxing, Muay Thai Savate
- Fighting out of: Varaždin, Croatia
- Team: Pit Bull Split; Kickboxing Club 300; Fight Club Kovačić

Kickboxing record
- Total: 130
- Wins: 108
- Losses: 20
- Draws: 2

Siniša Kovačić (born 3 August 1977) is a former Croatian bantamweight kickboxer fighting out of Varaždin, Croatia.

== Career ==
He started training martial arts with ten years, first karate, savate and later kickboxing, becoming Croatian champion in six disciplines: kickboxing, Muay Thai, Savate, full contact, boxing and K-1.

== Titles ==
- 2012 WKF World Full Muay Thai Rules Super Lightweight Champion -62,3 kg
- 2011 WKN World Kickboxing Super Bantamweight Champion -58,5 kg
- 2011 WKF World K-1 Rules Super Lightweight Champion -62,3 kg
- 2010 WPKC World Kickboxing Champion -59 kg
- 2009 W.A.K.O. Pro Intercontinental Full-Contact Bantamweight Champion -56,4 kg
- 2008 W.A.K.O. Pro European Full-Contact Featherweight Champion -58,2 kg
- 2002 European Savate Champion -60 kg (Defeated Guennady Maksimov)
- Mediterranean Savate Champion
- 24X Croatian Champion (Boxing, Kickboxing (Low-Kick, Full-Contact, K-1), Muay Thai, Savate)

== Kickboxing record ==
Professional kickboxing record
Date	Result	Opponent	Event	Location	Method	Round	Time
2012-12-22	Win	(Hungary) Janos Vass	Grand Fight - Simply the Best	Sračinec, Croatia	KO	2	
Wins WKF World Full Muay Thai Rules Super Lightweight Title -62,3 kg. Retiring bout.
2011-05-28	Win	(Poland) Gerard Linder	Grand Fight	Varaždin, Croatia	Decision (Unanimous)	5	3:00
Wins WKN World Kickboxing Super Bantamweight Title -58,5 kg.
2011-04-30	Win	(Switzerland) Jeton Zejna	Charity Fight Night	Kloten, Switzerland	Decision (Unanimous)	5	3:00
Wins WKF World K-1 Rules Super Lightweight Title -62,3 kg.
2010-06-19	Win	(Hungary) Tibor Tocsan		Čakovec, Croatia			
Wins WPKC World Kickboxing Title -59 kg.
2009-04-11	Win	(Germany) Nikolay Ride	The Night of Pitt Bull 2	Sračinec, Croatia	Technical decision (Unanimous)	7	
Wins W.A.K.O. Pro Intercontinental Full-Contact Bantamweight Title -56,4 kg.
2008-12-27	Loss	(France) Daniel Martins	Grand Fight	Varaždin, Croatia	Decision (Split)	12	2:00
For W.A.K.O. Pro World Full-Contact Featherweight Title -58,2 kg.
2008-07-26	Loss	(Italy) Lorenzo Fiaola	Kickboxing Night	Rome, Italy	TKO (Injury)	4	2:00
Lost W.A.K.O. Pro European Full-Contact Featherweight Title -58,2 kg.
2008-05-18	Win	(Italy) Lorenzo Fiaola		Varaždin, Croatia			
Wins W.A.K.O. Pro European Full-Contact Featherweight Title -58,2 kg.
2007-12	Loss	(Switzerland) Rocco Cipriano		Wohlen, Switzerland	Decision	12	2:00
For W.A.K.O. Pro European Full-Contact Featherweight Title -58,2 kg.
2006-04-29	Win	(Croatia) Mate Bebić	Confrontation in the Ring IV	Split, Croatia	TKO	3	
Legend: Win Loss Draw/No contest Notes

== See also ==
- List of WAKO Amateur World Championships
- List of WAKO Amateur European Championships
- List of male kickboxers
