= Bruay-sur-l'Escaut =

Bruay-sur-l’Escaut
- Commune
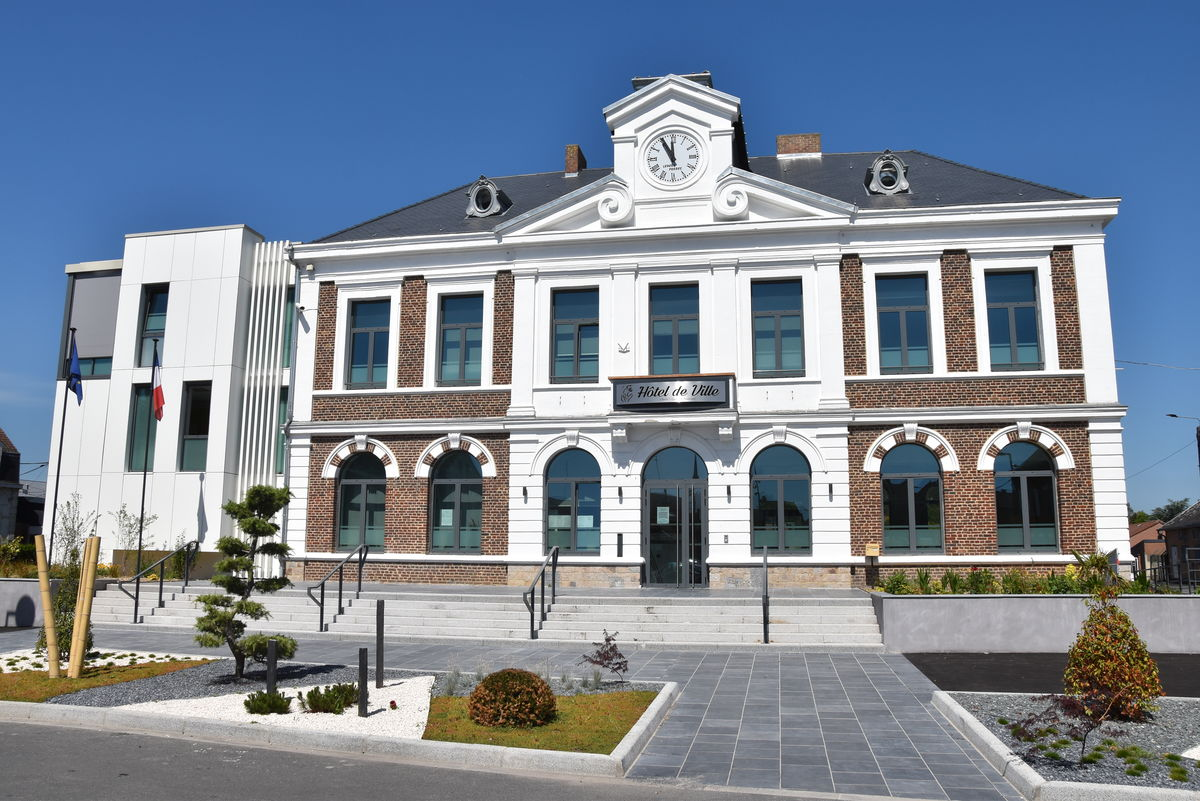
- The town hall in Bruay-sur-l'Escaut

- Coat of arms
- Location of Bruay-sur-l’Escaut
- Location within France Location within Hauts-de-France
- Coordinates: 50°23′56″N 3°32′25″E
- Country: France
- Region: Hauts-de-France
- Department: Nord
- Arrondissement: Valenciennes
- Canton: Anzin
- Intercommunality: CA Valenciennes Métropole

Government
  - Mayor (2020–2026): Sylvia Duhamel
- Area^{1}: 6.7 km^{2} (2.6 sq mi)
- Highest elevation: 34 m (112 ft)
- Lowest elevation: 17 m (56 ft)
- Population (2023): 11,644
  - Density: 1,700/km^{2} (4,500/sq mi)
- Time zone: UTC+01:00 (CET)
  - Summer (DST): UTC+02:00 (CEST)
- INSEE/Postal code: 59112 /59860
- ^{1} French Land Register data, which excludes lakes, ponds, glaciers > 1 km^{2} (0.386 sq mi or 247 acres) and river estuaries.

Bruay-sur-l'Escaut (French pronunciation: [bʁyɛ syʁ lɛsko], literally Bruay on the Escaut) is a commune in the Nord department in northern France.

== Geography ==
Bruay-sur-l'Escaut is 6 km north of Valenciennes on the left bank of the river Scheldt (French: Escaut): Bruay-sur-l'Escaut = Bruay on the Scheldt. It is 12 km from the Belgian border at Quiévrain.

== Name of the commune ==
Named Bruail, Brueil, Bruel, Bruech in the Middle Ages and Bruay afterwards. In 1902 the name was changed to Bruay-sur-l'Escaut in order to avoid confusion with Bruay-la-Buissière in Pas-de-Calais.

== Quarters ==
- Bruay centre
- Thiers
- Le Pinson
- Les Hauts Champs
- Le Pont de Bruay
- Le Fruitier
- Le Rivage
- La Folie
- La Baillette
- Les Ruelles
- Le Point du Jour

== Population ==
Historical population

Year	Pop.	±% p.a.
1800	1,160	—
1806	1,437	+3.63%
1821	1,716	+1.19%
1831	1,907	+1.06%
1836	1,966	+0.61%
1841	2,089	+1.22%
1846	2,320	+2.12%
1851	2,463	+1.20%
1856	2,635	+1.36%
1861	3,060	+3.04%
1866	3,251	+1.22%
1872	3,870	+2.95%
1876	4,392	+3.21%
1881	4,549	+0.70%
1886	4,778	+0.99%
1891	4,934	+0.64%
1896	6,053	+4.17%
1901	7,095	+3.23%

Year	Pop.	±% p.a.
1906	7,482	+1.07%
1911	7,840	+0.94%
1921	7,330	−0.67%
1926	9,042	+4.29%
1931	9,411	+0.80%
1936	9,144	−0.57%
1946	9,431	+0.31%
1954	10,493	+1.34%
1962	12,168	+1.87%
1968	12,546	+0.51%
1975	12,207	−0.39%
1982	11,810	−0.47%
1990	11,771	−0.04%
1999	11,828	+0.05%
2007	11,881	+0.06%
2012	11,975	+0.16%
2017	11,449	−0.89%
2023	11,644	+0.28%

Source: EHESS and INSEE (1968-2023)

== Heraldry ==
Arms of Bruay-sur-l'Escaut	The arms of Bruay-sur-l'Escaut are blazoned : Per fess 1: quarterly Or and Or, 4 lions sable, gules, gules, and sable; 2: Azure, 3 ducks argent.

== Economy ==
At 19th century there are 1300 inhabitants in Bruay, they worked in foundries and glasswares. In Starting from 1856, the inhabitants exploit the subterranean coal veins with a coalmine sunk by the Coalmines Company of Anzin ( in French : Compagnie des mines d'Anzin). Afterwards, some houses built and alien labour forces from Belgium recruited, the population of Bruay open out to 6000 inhabitants, some breweries and ironmongeries created, today disappeared.

=== The mine of Thiers ===
In 1728, industry, greedy for combustibles, used up all the forest wood around Bruay. Some drilling to find a coal veins was attempted. The Lagrance coalmine, with low firedamp and a shaft with a depth of 139 metres, created in 1858. Some quicksands and water who invaded the building site (45 cubic metres per second), retarded the workers pending the coalmine construction. The name of the coalmine, Lagrange, descend of the baron Lagrange 's name, who was la Compagnie des mines d'Anzin manager. Starting from 1871 to 1873 the compagny created coalmine houses city around the coalmine (coron in French) to loge the coalmine labour workers. On 10 October 1918 the German soldiers dynamited the coal mine, the water invaded the galleries and the production has been stopped. The exploitation will go back to work in 1919. At this date, a coke firme and generating station created. The coalmine has been closed in 1954. The slag heap, rich in schist, has been used for the construction of the A2 motorway ( autoroute A2 in French) in 1970 and the easel has been disassembled.

== See also ==
- Communes of the Nord department
