= List of castles in Thuringia =

Numerous castles are found in the German state of Thuringia. These buildings, some of which have a history of over 1000 years, were the setting of historical events, domains of famous personalities and are still imposing buildings to this day.

This list encompasses castles described in German as Burg (castle), Festung (fort/fortress), Schloss (manor house) and Palais/Palast (palace). Many German castles after the Middle Ages were mainly built as royal or ducal palaces rather than as a fortified building.

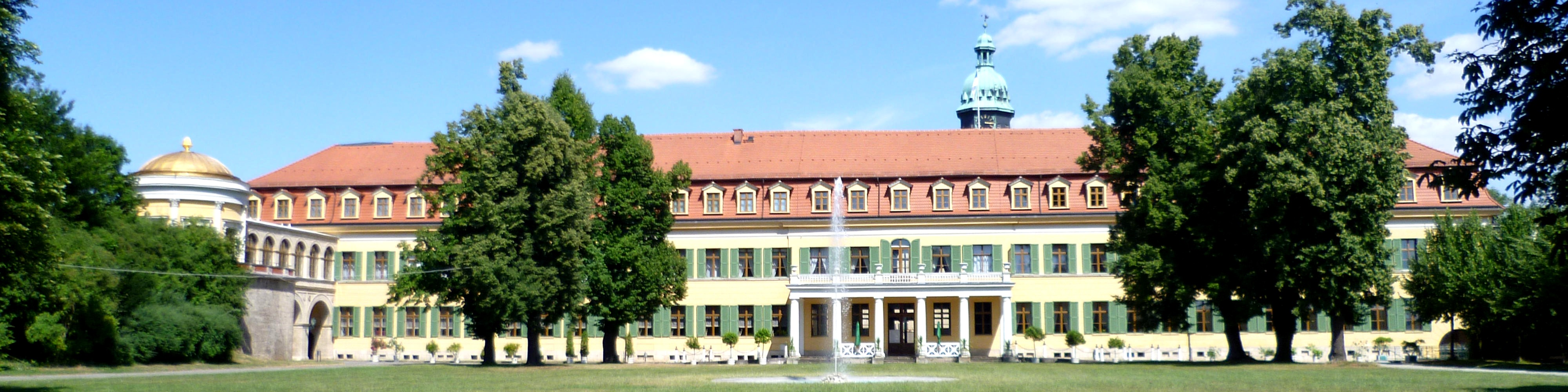
Sondershausen Palace, Parkside

== Eisenach ==
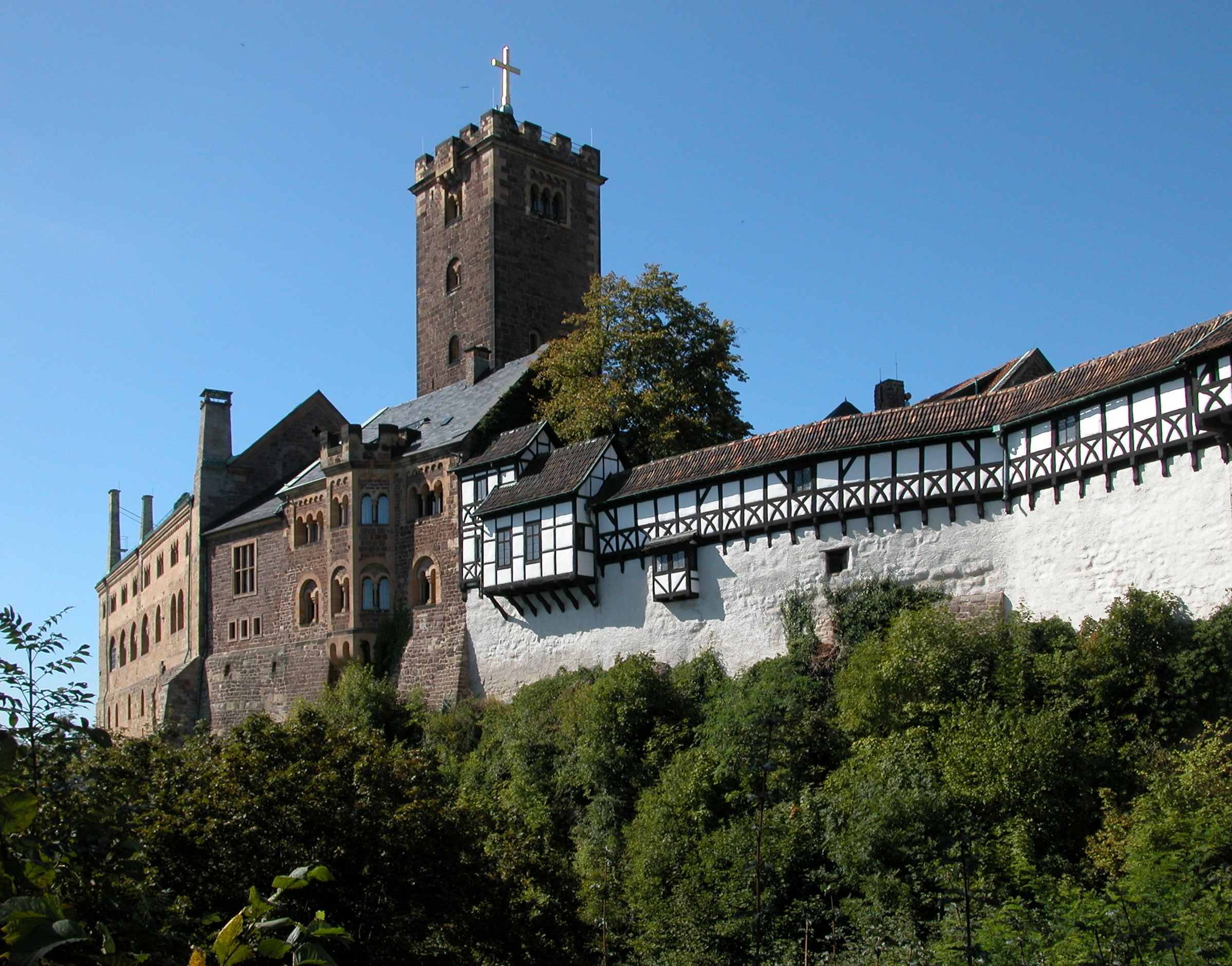
Wartburg

1. Wartburg
2. Metilstein (Ruins)
3. Eisenacher Burg (Ruins)
4. Residenz und Stadtschloss zu Sachsen-Weimar-Eisenach (in restoration)
5. Residenzhaus Esplanade (remains of the castle, restored)
6. Jagdschloss zur hohen Sonne (requires immediate restoration)
7. Eichel-Streibersche Villa auf dem Pflugensberg (restored, location of the Evangelischen Thüringischen Landeskirche)
8. Schloss Boyneburgk zu Eisenach-Stedtfeld (in restoration)
9. Schloss Fischbach
10. Eichelsche Rittergut zu Eisenach-Madelungen (partly kepy)
11. Schloss zu Eisenach-Neuenhof (restored, privately owned)

== Erfurt ==
1. Zitadelle Cyriaksburg
2. Schloss Molsdorf
3. Petersberg Citadel
4. Forsthaus Willroda

== Gera ==
1. Schloss Osterstein
2. Schloss Tinz (once Wasserschloss)

== Jena ==
1. Kunitzburg (Gleißburg/Burg Gleißberg)
2. Ruine Lobdeburg
3. Untere Lobdeburg
4. Schloss Talstein

== Weimar ==
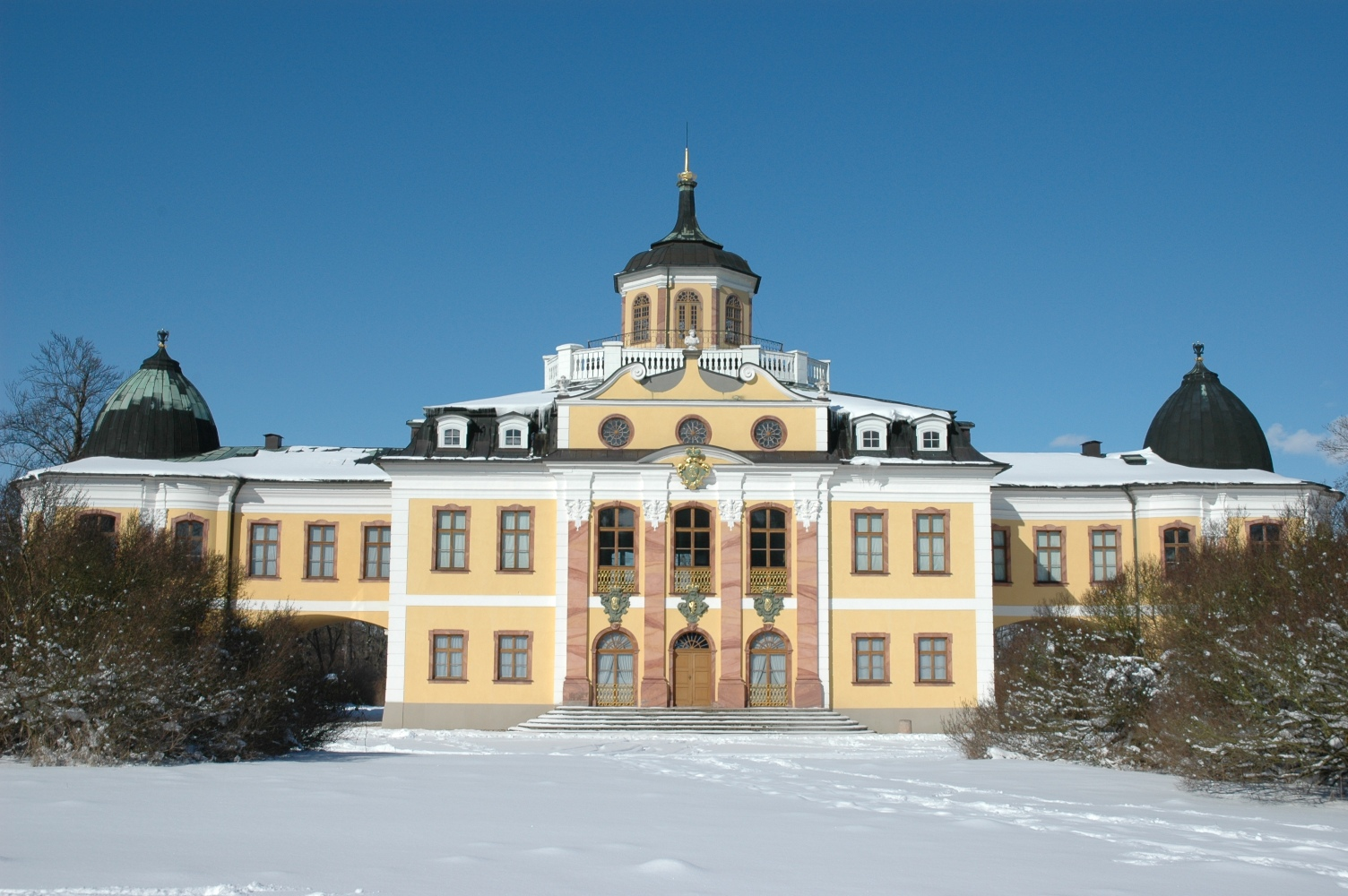
Belvedere seen from the garden in winter

1. Schloss Weimar
2. Schloss Belvedere
3. Schloss Tiefurt
4. Gelbes Schloss
5. Grünes Schloss with Herzogin-Anna-Amalia-Bibliothek
6. Rotes Schloss

== Landkreis Altenburger Land ==
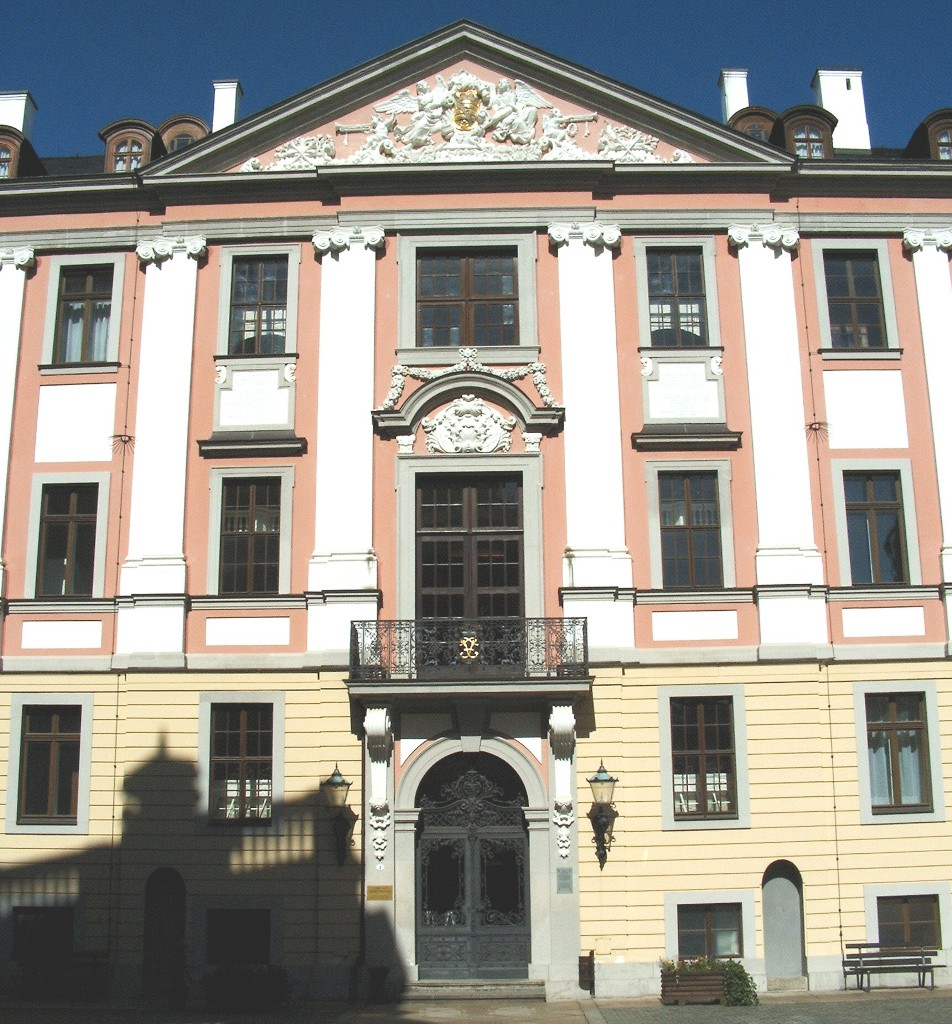
Altenburg

1. Schloss Altenburg, Altenburg
2. Schloss Ehrenberg, Altenburg
3. Schloß Poschwitz, Altenburg
4. Wasserschloss Dobitschen, Dobitschen
5. Schlößchen Tannenfeld, Löbichau
6. Schloß Ponitz, Ponitz
7. Burg Posterstein, Posterstein
8. Wasserschloß Windischleuba, Windischleuba

== Landkreis Eichsfeld ==
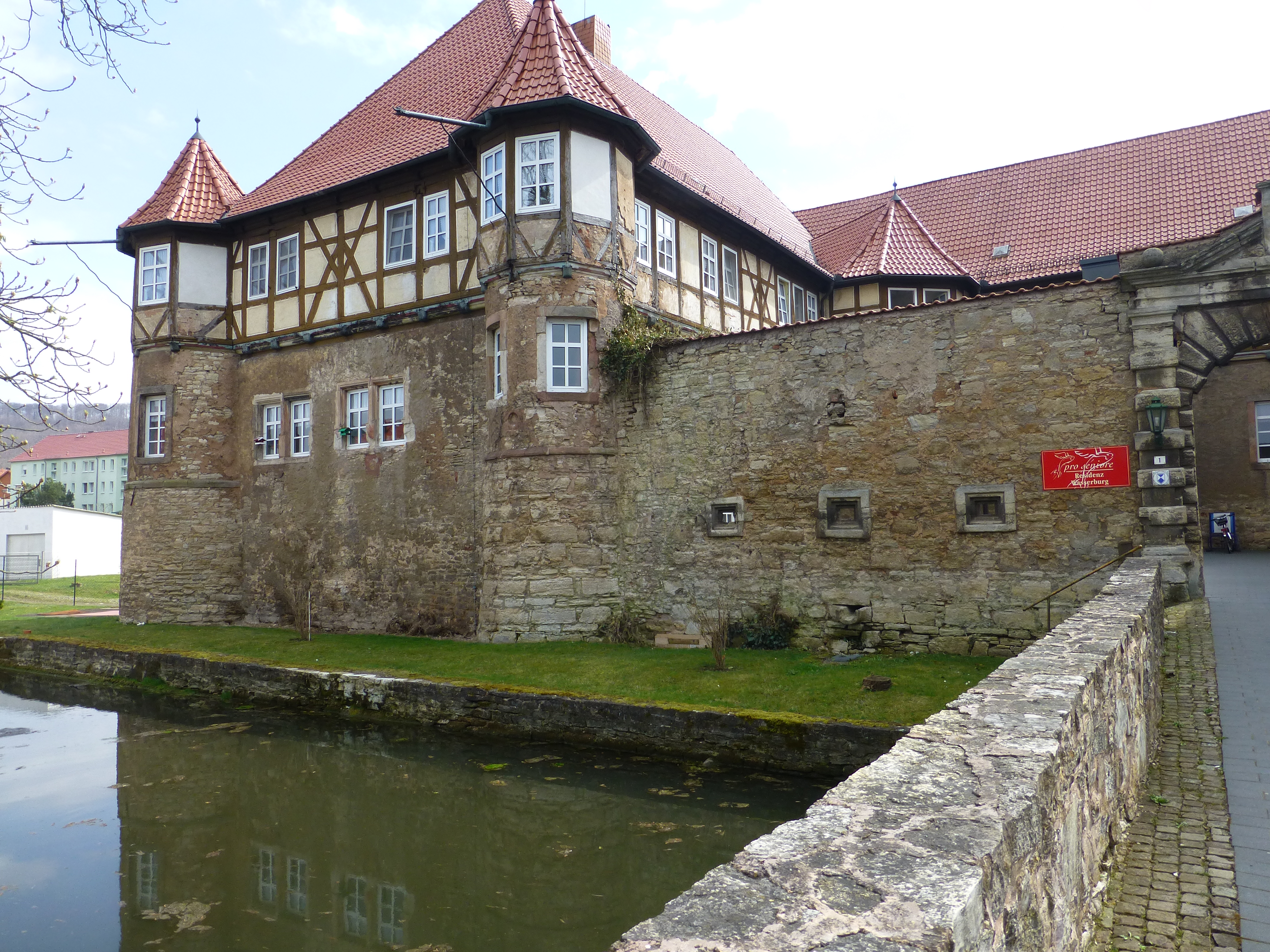
Deuna watercastle

1. Burgruine Altenstein, Asbach-Sickenberg
2. Burg Westernhagen, Berlingerode
3. Burg Hanstein, Bornhagen
4. Hasenburg (Buhla), Buhla
5. Schloss Buhla, Buhla
6. Wasserburg Deuna, Deuna
7. Burgruine Greifenstein, Geismar
8. Burg Großbodungen, Großbodungen
9. Steinernes Haus, Haynrode
10. Haarburg, Haynrode
11. Mainzer Schloss, Heilbad Heiligenstadt
12. Burg Bodenstein, Leinefelde-Worbis
13. Burg Scharfenstein, Leinefelde-Worbis
14. Burgruine Rusteberg, Marth
15. Schloss Rusteberg, Marth
16. Schloss Martinfeld, Schimberg
17. Burg Gleichenstein, Wachstedt

== Landkreis Gotha ==
1. Schloss Fischbach, Emsetal
2. Burgruine Winterstein, Emsetal
3. Schloss Reinhardsbrunn, Friedrichroda
4. Schloss Friedrichswerth, Friedrichswerth
5. Schloss Georgenthal, Georgenthal
6. Schloss Friedenstein, Gotha
7. Schloss Friedrichsthal, Gotha
8. Schloss Mönchshof, Gotha
9. Burgruine Schwarzwald (Käfernburg), Luisenthal
10. Mühlburg, Mühlberg
11. Schloss Ehrenstein, Ohrdruf
12. Kettenburg, Tonna
13. Altes Schloss, Schwabhausen
14. Burg Gleichen, Wandersleben
15. Schloss Tenneberg, Waltershausen

== Landkreis Greiz ==
1. Sommerpalais Greiz, Greiz
2. Oberes Schloss Greiz, Greiz
3. Unteres Schloss Greiz, Greiz
4. Schloss Dölau, Greiz
5. Burg Pöllnitz, Harth-Pöllnitz
6. Burg Reichenfels, Hohenleuben
7. Osterburg, Weida

== Landkreis Hildburghausen ==
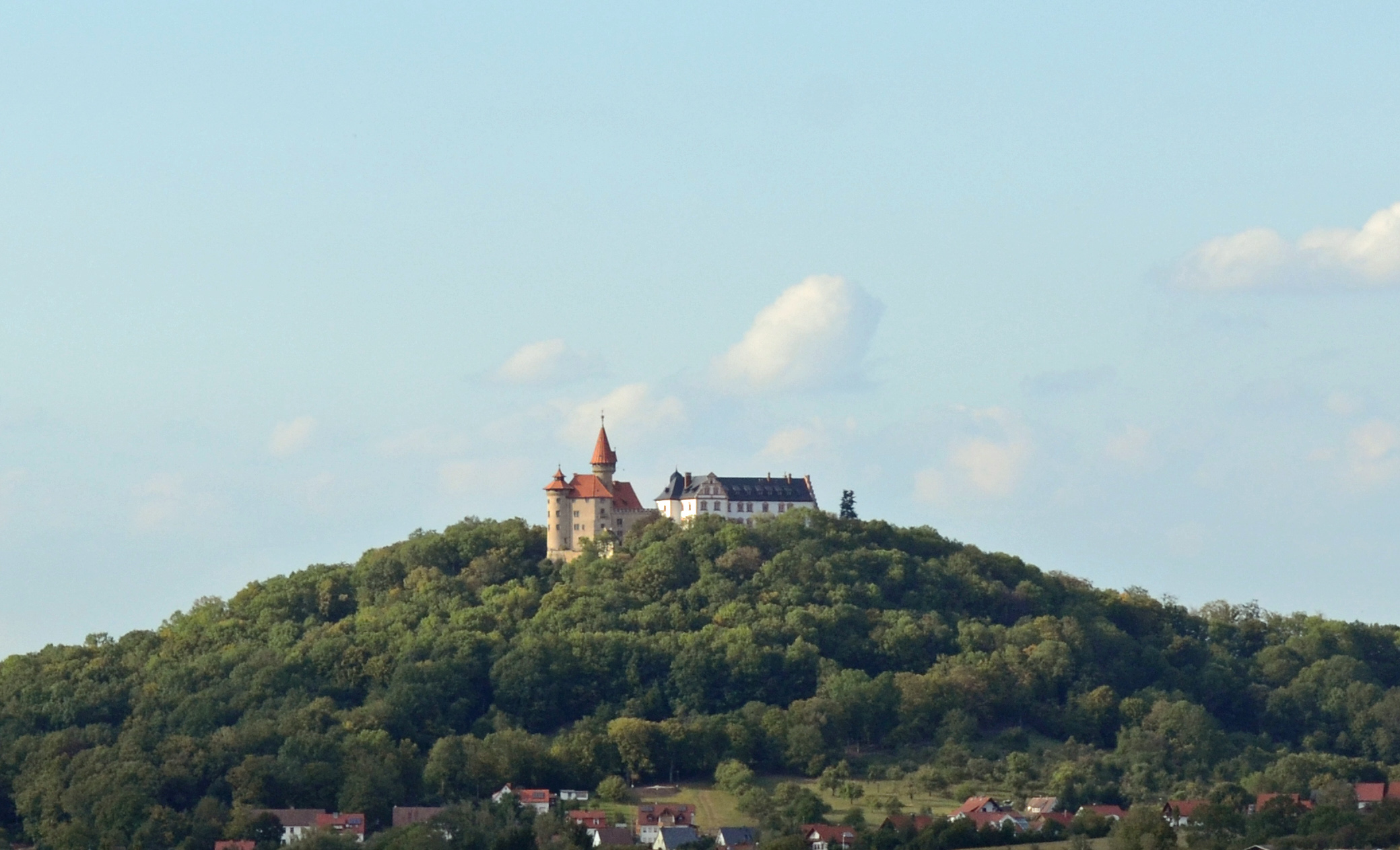
Heldburg castle

1. Veste Heldburg, Bad Colberg-Heldburg
2. Osterburg, Henfstädt
3. Schloss Bertholdsburg, Schleusingen
4. Burgruine Straufhain, Straufhain

== Ilm-Kreis ==
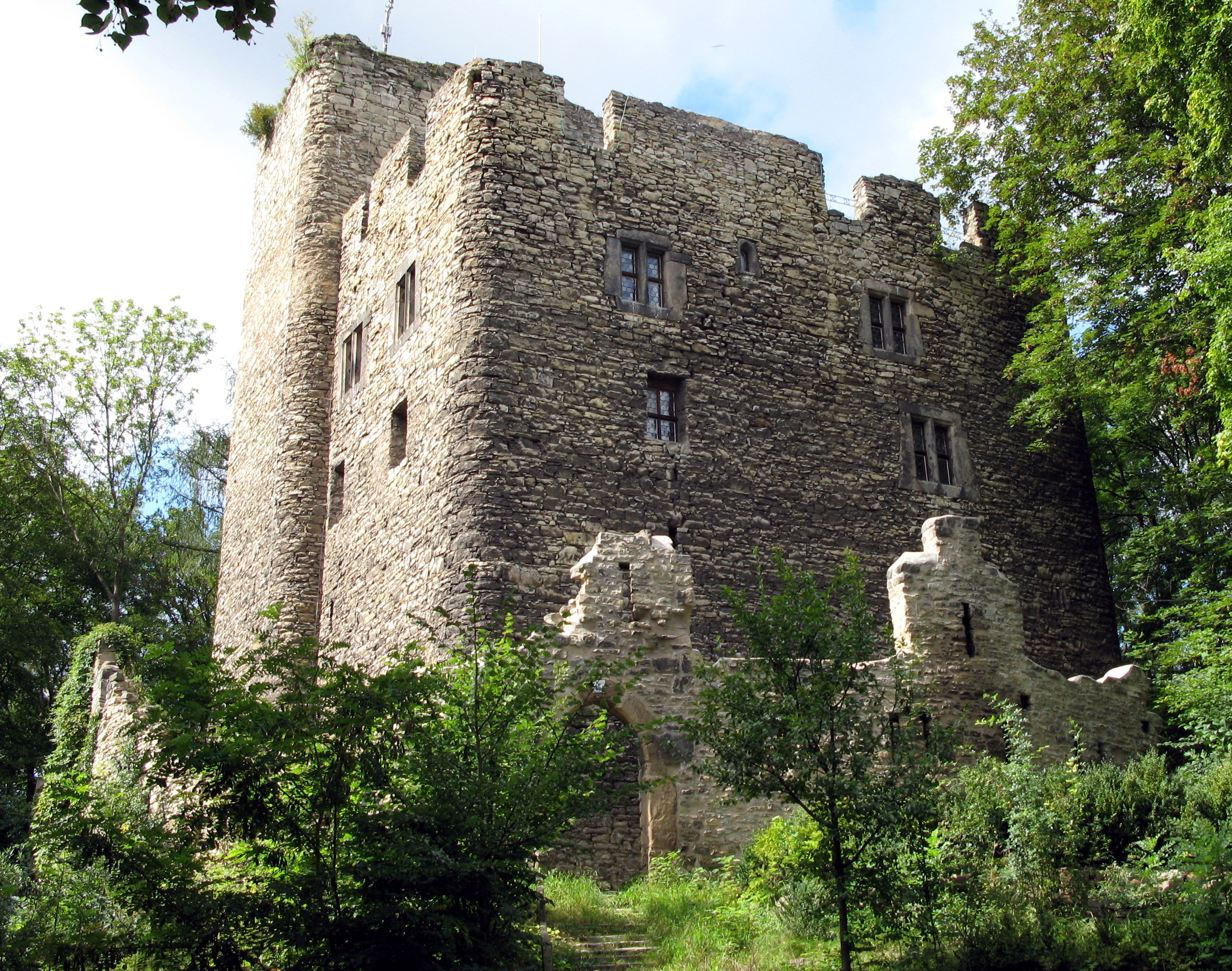
The Ehrenburg at Plaue.

1. Alteburg, Arnstadt
2. Käfernburg, Arnstadt
3. Schloss Neideck, Arnstadt
4. Neues Palais, Arnstadt
5. Schloss Elgersburg, Elgersburg
6. Raubschloss, Gräfenroda
7. Burg Ehrenstein, Ilmtal
8. Wasserburg Grossliebringen, Ilmtal
9. Wasserburg, Ilmenau
10. Burg Liebenstein, Liebenstein
11. Ehrenburg, Plaue
12. Burgruine Reinsburg, Wipfratal
13. Schloss Stadtilm, Stadtilm
14. Wachsenburg Castle, Amt Wachsenburg

== Kyffhäuserkreis ==
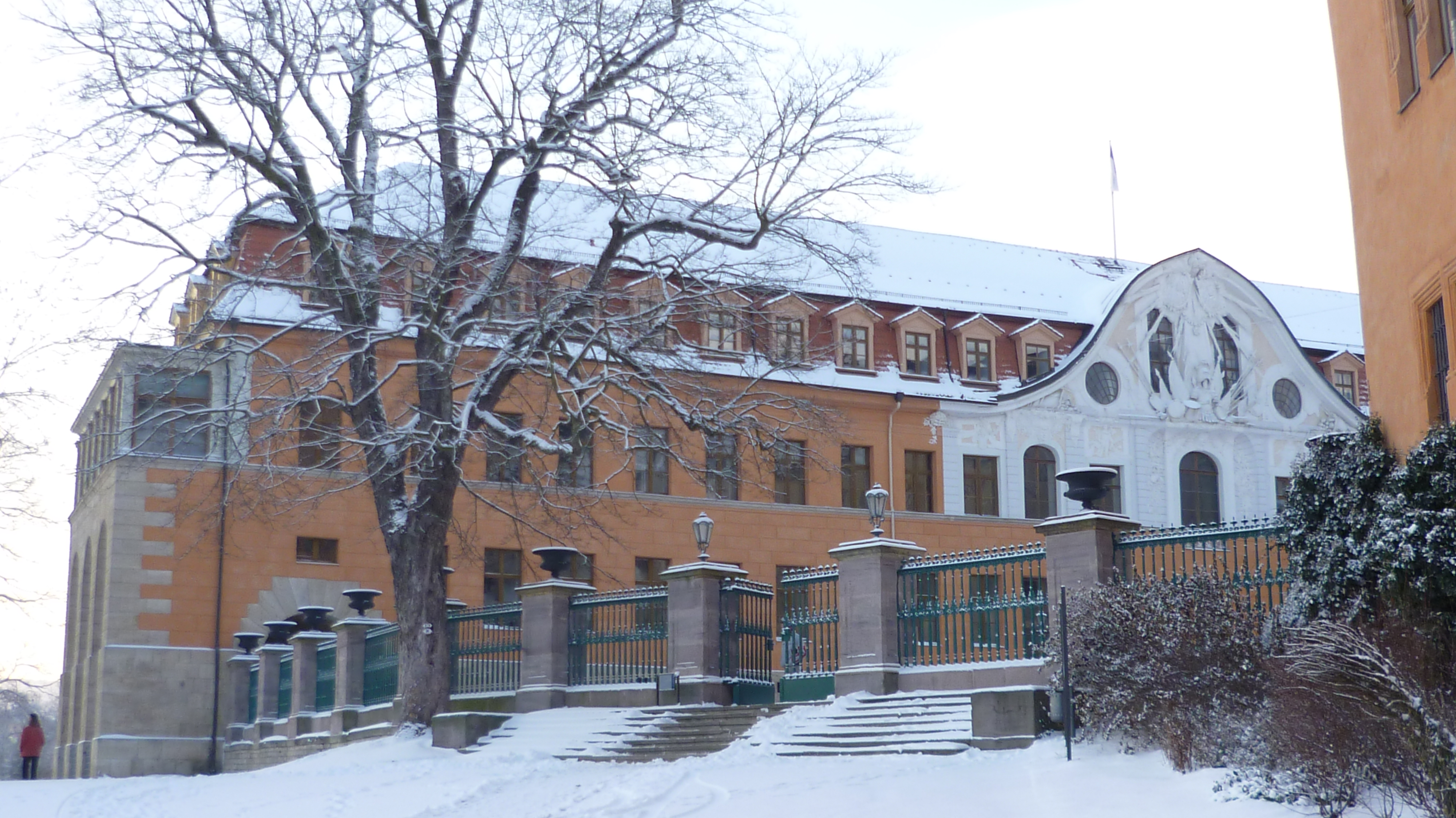
Sondershausen Palace, Westwing

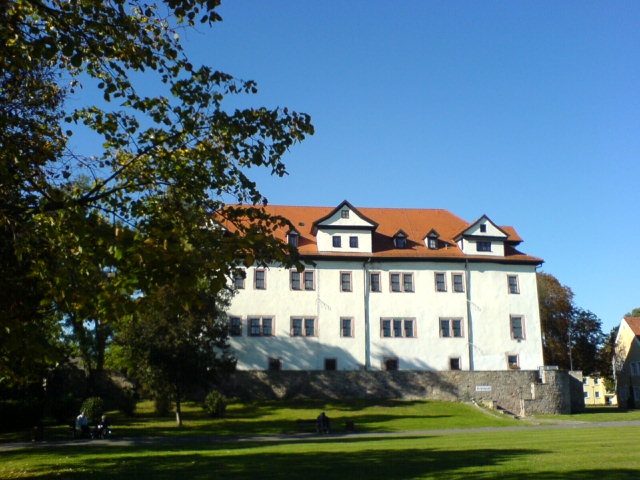
The castle of Bad Frankenhausen.

1. Schloss Bad Frankenhausen (Unterburg), Bad Frankenhausen
2. Oberburg, Bad Frankenhausen
3. Schloss Bendeleben, Bendeleben
4. Schloss Clingen, Clingen
5. Schloss Ebeleben, Ebeleben
6. Schloss Grüningen, Greußen
7. Keula Water Castle, Helbedündorf
8. Heldrungen Castle, Heldrungen
9. Obere Sachsenburg, Oldisleben
10. Untere Sachsenburg (Hakenburg), Oldisleben
11. Schloss Rottleben, Rottleben
12. Falkenburg, Rottleben
13. Burg Straußberg, Schernberg
14. Arnsburg (Burg) Arensburg, Seega
15. Sondershausen Palace, Sondershausen
16. Prinzenpalais, Sondershausen
17. Jagdschloss "Zum Possen", Sondershausen
18. Burg Spatenberg, Sondershausen
19. Burg Furra, Sondershausen
20. Jagdschloss Rathsfeld, Steinthaleben
21. Kyffhausen Castle, Steinthaleben
22. Burg Rothenburg, Steinthaleben
23. Funkenburg, Westgreußen
24. Burg Rabenswalde, Wiehe
25. Schloss Wiehe, Wiehe

== Landkreis Nordhausen ==
1. Humboldtsches Schloss, Auleben
2. Lohra Castle, Großlohra
3. Schloss Hainrode, Hainrode
4. Ebersburg (Harz), Herrmannsacker
5. Schloss Heringen, Heringen/Helme
6. Ilburg, Ilfeld
7. Hohnstein Castle, Neustadt/Harz
8. Heinrichsburg, Neustadt/Harz
9. Wasserschloss "Blauer Hof", Niedergebra
10. Schloss "Hue de Grais", Wolkramshausen

== Saale-Holzland-Kreis ==
1. Camburg Castle, Camburg
2. Schloss Crossen, Crossen an der Elster
3. Reichsburg Dornburg, Dornburg / Saale
4. Renaissance-Schloss Dornburg, Dornburg/Saale
5. Rokoko-Schloss Dornburg, Dornburg/Saale
6. Christianenburg, Eisenberg
7. Schloss Frauenprießnitz, Frauenprießnitz
8. Wasserburg Lehesten, Lehesten
9. Orlamünde Castle, Orlamünde
10. Kemenate Reinstädt, Reinstädt
11. Leuchtenburg, Seitenroda
12. Schkölen Castle, Schkölen
13. Jagdschloss Fröhliche Wiederkunft, Trockenborn-Wolfersdorf
14. Burgruine Tautenburg, Tautenburg

== Saale-Orla-Kreis ==
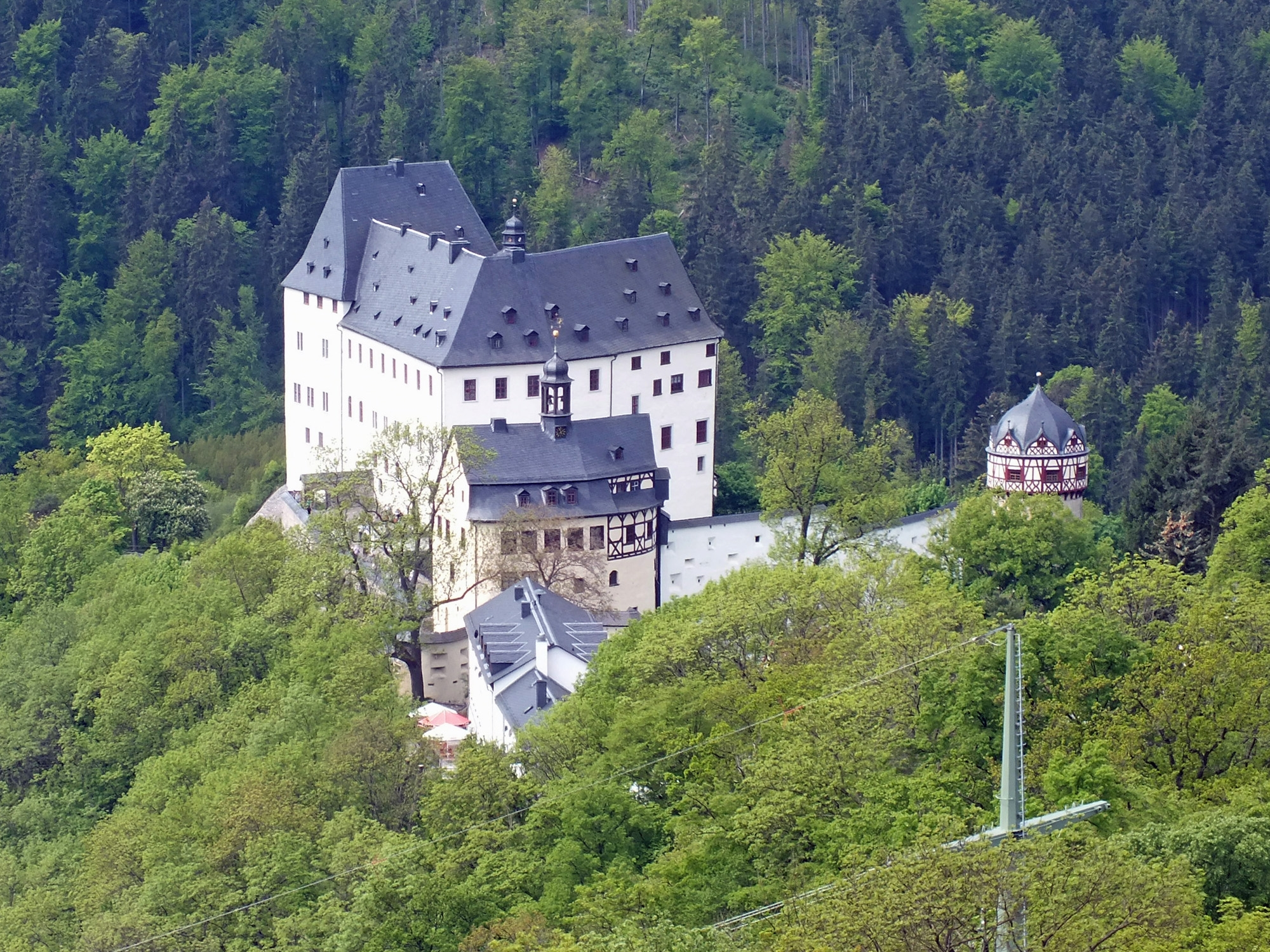
Burgk castle

1. Ranis Castle, Ranis
2. Triptis Castle, Triptis
3. Schlossruine Wernburg, Wernburg
4. Schloß Burgk, Burgk

== Landkreis Saalfeld-Rudolstadt ==
1. Greifenstein Castle, Bad Blankenburg
2. Schloss Heidecksburg, Rudolstadt
3. Schloss Hirschhügel
4. Schloss Kochberg, Großkochberg
5. Könitz Castle, Unterwellenborn
6. Jagdschloss Paulinzella, Rottenbach
7. Burgruine Schauenforst, Uhlstädt-Kirchhasel
8. Hoher Schwarm, Saalfeld / Saale
9. Schloss Schwarzburg, Schwarzburg
10. Weißenburg, Uhlstädt-Kirchhasel

== Landkreis Schmalkalden-Meiningen ==
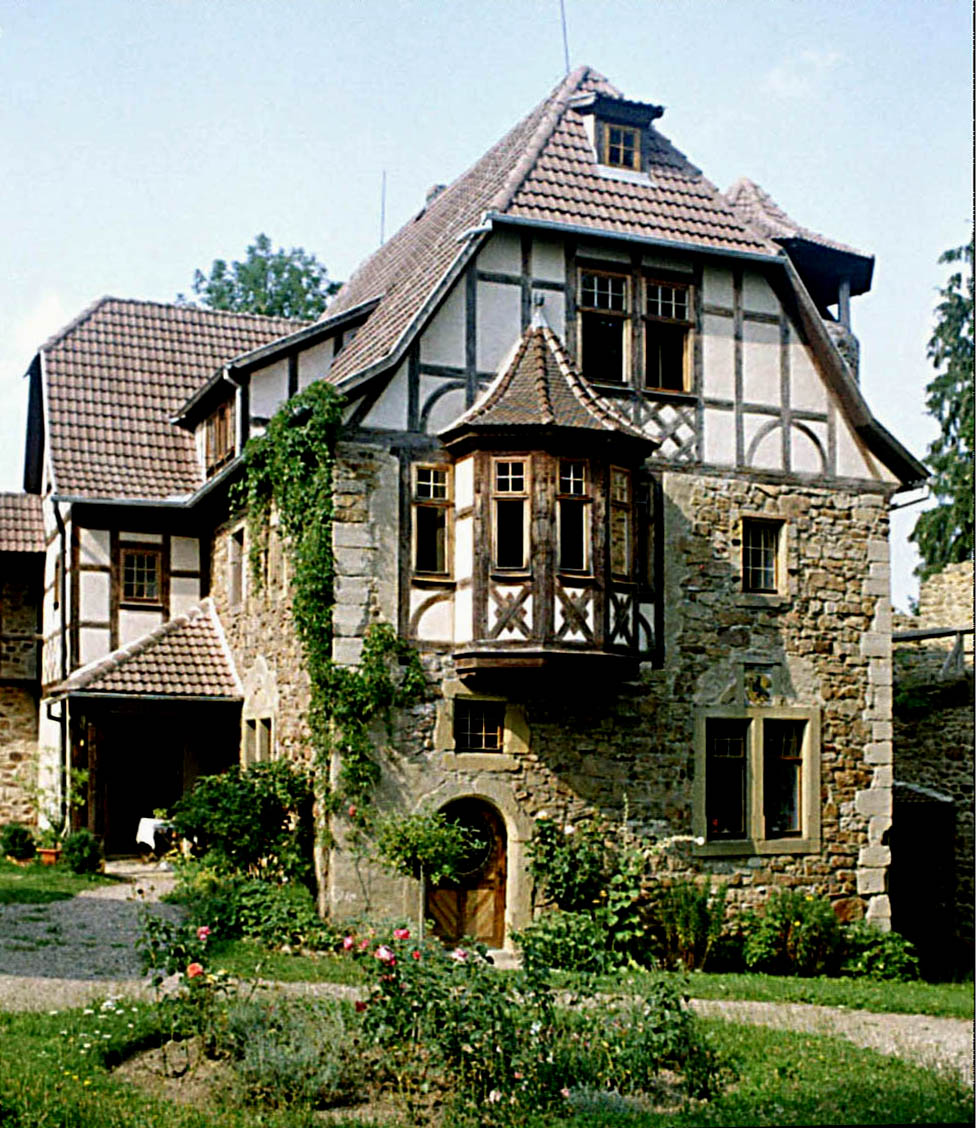
Burg Bibra

1. Burg Bibra, Bibra
2. Schloss Elisabethenburg, Meiningen
3. Burgruine Hallenburg, Steinbach-Hallenberg
4. Burg Henneberg, Henneberg
5. Johanniterburg, Kühndorf
6. Schloss Landsberg, Meiningen
7. Burgruine Marienluft, Wasungen
8. Wasserschloss, Schwarza
9. Schloss Wilhelmsburg, Schmalkalden

== Landkreis Sömmerda ==
1. Schloss Beichlingen, Beichlingen
2. Schloss Eckstedt, Eckstedt
3. Schloss Gebesee, Gebesee
4. Schloss Kannawurf, Kannawurf
5. Wasserburg Markvippach, Markvippach
6. Wasserschloss Ostramondra, Ostramondra
7. Raspenburg, Rastenberg
8. Runneburg, Weißensee
9. Burgruine Teutleben, Eßleben-Teutleben
10. Wasserburg Ollendorf, Ollendorf

== Landkreis Sonneberg ==
1. Schloss Niederlind, Sonneberg

== Unstrut-Hainich-Kreis ==
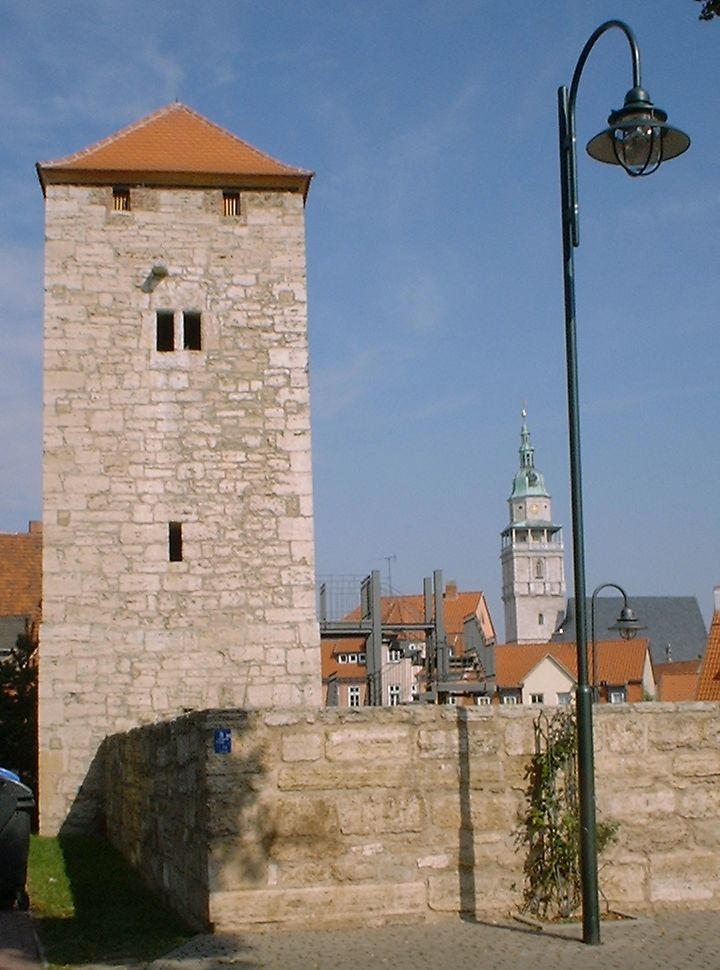
Hungerturm in Bad Langensalza

1. Schloss Altengottern, Altengottern
2. Schloss Bischofstein, Lengenfeld unterm Stein
3. Dryburg, Bad Langensalza
4. Friederikenschlößchen, Bad Langensalza
5. Schloss Goldacker, Weberstedt
6. Schlossruine Herbsleben, Herbsleben
7. Schloss Neunheilingen, Neunheilingen
8. Schloss Schlotheim, Schlotheim
9. Burg Seebach, Seebach
10. Sommerfeldsches Schloss, Großvargula
11. Burg Stein, Lengenfeld unterm Stein
12. Burgruine Thamsbrück, Bad Langensalza
13. Burgruine Ufhoven, Bad Langensalza

== Wartburgkreis ==
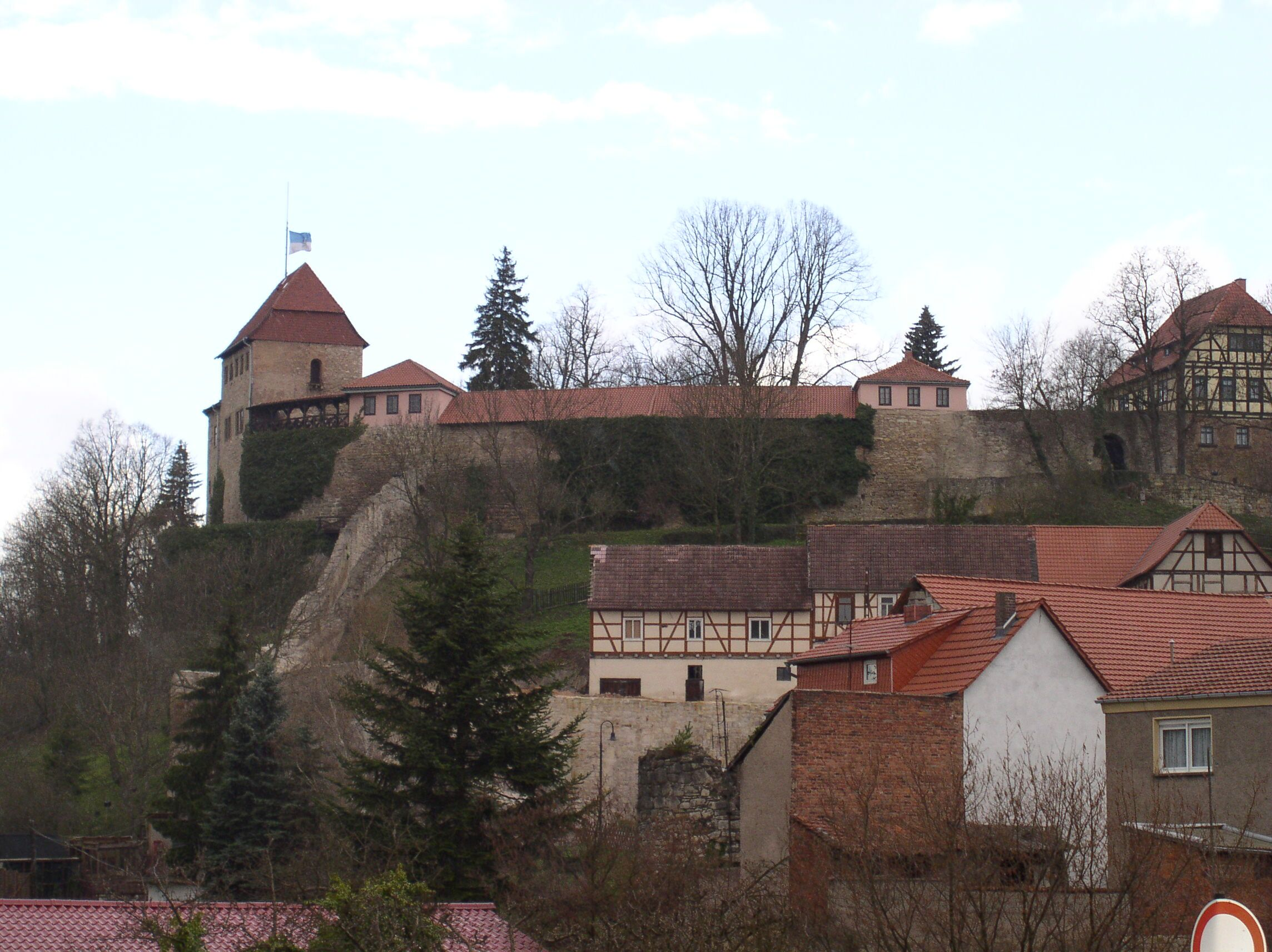
The Creuzburg Castle

1. Schloss Altenstein, Bad Liebenstein
2. Burgruine Altenstein, Bad Liebenstein
3. Burgruine Liebenstein, Bad Liebenstein
4. Ruine Brandenburg, Gerstungen
5. Burg Creuzburg, Creuzburg
6. Schloss Glücksbrunn, Schweina
7. Burgruine Haineck, Nazza
8. Burg Normannstein, Treffurt
9. Burgstelle Bocksberg, Schleid (Rhön)
10. Graues Schloss, Mihla
11. Rotes Schloss, Mihla
12. Scharfenburg, Ruhla
13. Schloss Tüngeda, Behringen
14. Schloss Behringen, Behringen

== Landkreis Weimarer Land ==
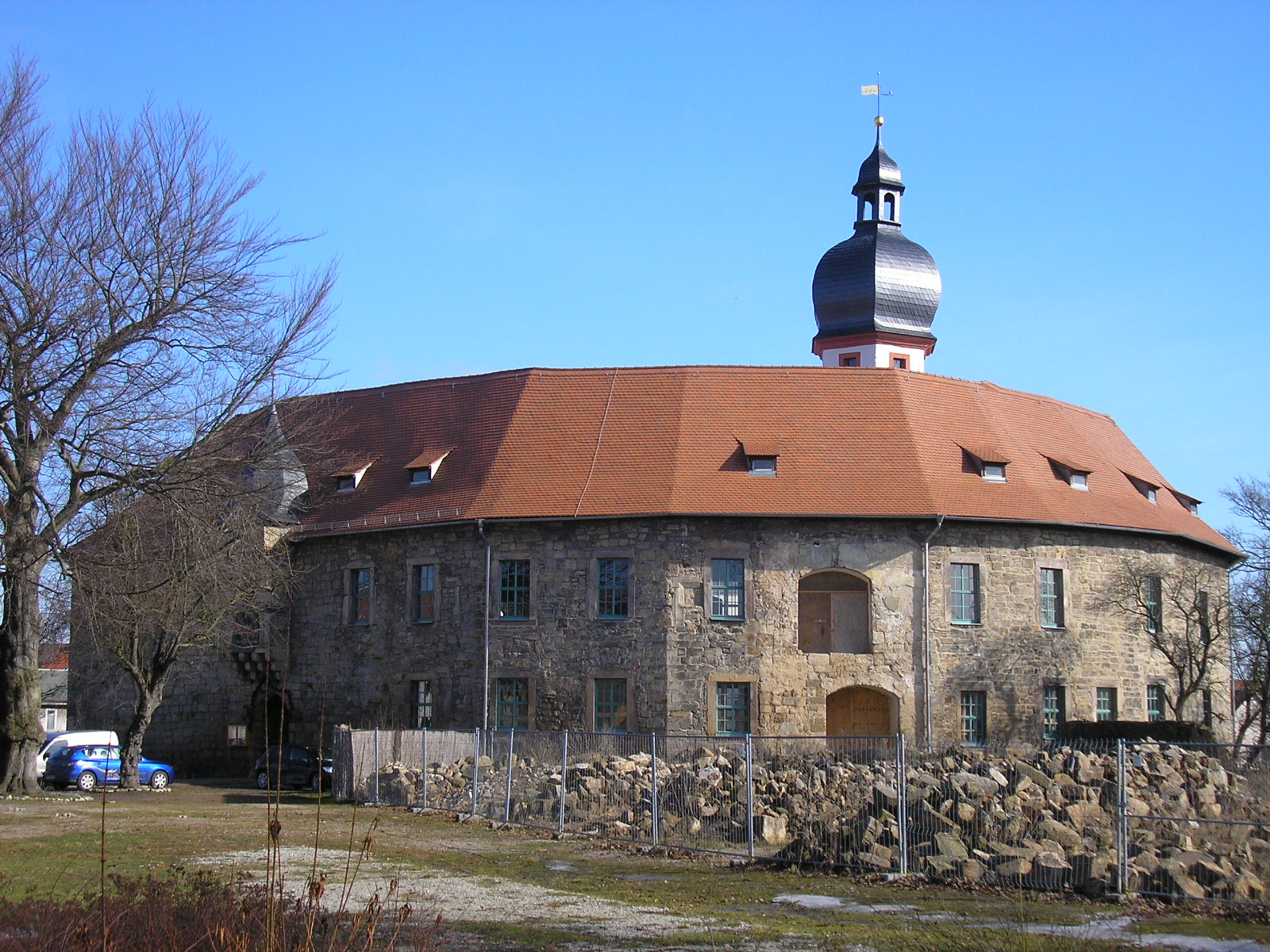
Blankenhain castle

1. Altes Schloss, Bad Berka
2. Burg Apolda, Apolda
3. Schloss Blankenhain, Blankenhain
4. Felsenburg Buchfart, Buchfart
5. Schloss Denstedt (Altes Schloss), Kromsdorf
6. Schloss Ettersburg, Ettersburg
7. Wasserburg Kapellendorf, Kapellendorf
8. Niedernburg Kranichfeld, Kranichfeld
9. Oberschloss Kranichfeld, Kranichfeld
10. Wasserburg Liebstedt, Liebstedt
11. Schloss Kromsdorf, Kromsdorf
12. Wasserburg Niederroßla, Niederroßla
13. Schloss Oßmannstedt, Oßmannstedt
14. Burg Tannroda, Tannroda
15. Schloss Tonndorf, Tonndorf

== See also ==
- List of castles
- List of castles in Germany
