= Käthe Menzel-Jordan =

German architect (1916–2026)

- Menzel-Jordan, aged 100, in 2016
- Born: Käthe Hertel; 7 September 1916; Erfurt, Province of Saxony, Kingdom of Prussia, German Empire
- Died: 1 March 2026 (aged 109); Erfurt, Thuringia, Germany
- Occupations: Architect; Preservationist

Käthe Menzel-Jordan (née Hertel; 7 September 1916 – 1 March 2026) was a German architect and preservationist. She worked mainly in the field of restoring historic buildings in Erfurt and in the region after the destruction of World War II, including the Goethe House in Weimar, and the Augustinerkloster and Schloss Molsdorf in Erfurt.

== Life and work ==
Käthe Hertel was born in Erfurt on 7 September 1916. Her grandfather Reinhold Schreiber owned a construction business on Michaelisstraße in Erfurt and was a very busy building contractor in the last quarter of the 19th century. Menzel-Jordan therefore decided to work professionally in the construction industry.

During the 1930s, Menzel-Jordan studied architecture and art history at the Technische Hochschule Dresden. The outbreak of World War II surprised her there; she decided to take advantage of another training opportunity and dealt with business administration and technical administration. She survived the air raids on Dresden by chance, as she was on home leave during the time. When she returned, her Dresden apartment with all her belongings and the dissertation that she had already started had been destroyed.

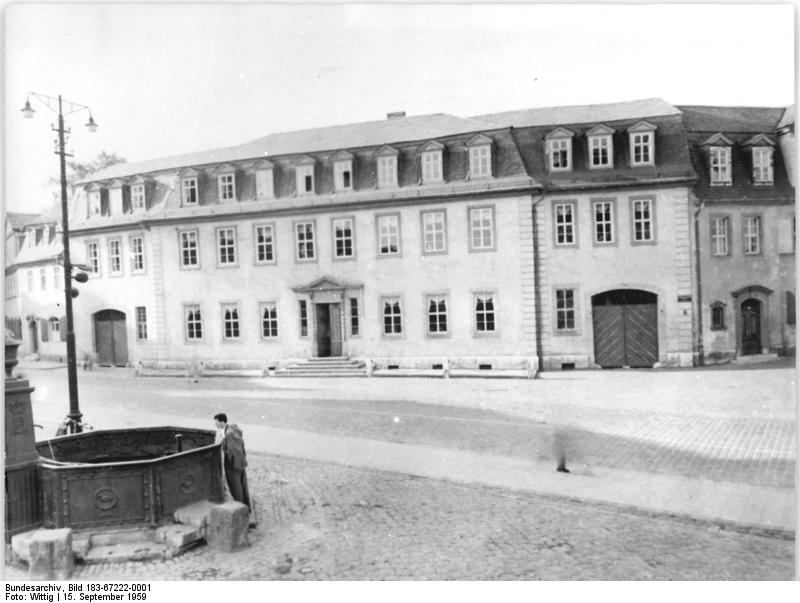
Goethe House in Weimar in 1959

After her return, Menzel-Jordan intentionally took on many emergency security assignments and projects to alleviate the housing shortage in Weimar which was also destroyed by air raids. She was able to finish her training with the Thuringian state government. She received orders from the Soviet headquarters in Weimar to secure the devastated Goethe House and to put it back in order. Many similar projects followed until the founding of East Germany.

Menzel-Jordan decided to expand her professional knowledge by studying further in Dresden. Her dissertation, submitted in 1955, dealt with the approximately 50 watermills that existed in Erfurt since the Middle Ages.

As a freelance architect in the Ulbricht era, Menzel-Jordan initially only found offers that did not present a challenge for her creative skills and knowledge, but finally found a rich field of activity in cooperation with the church building authorities in Erfurt and later also the respective building departments in the city administration. She led the project to restore the Augustinerkloster and Augustinerkirche, which had been destroyed by British mine bombs, and transform it to a facility for conferences and meetings of the church.

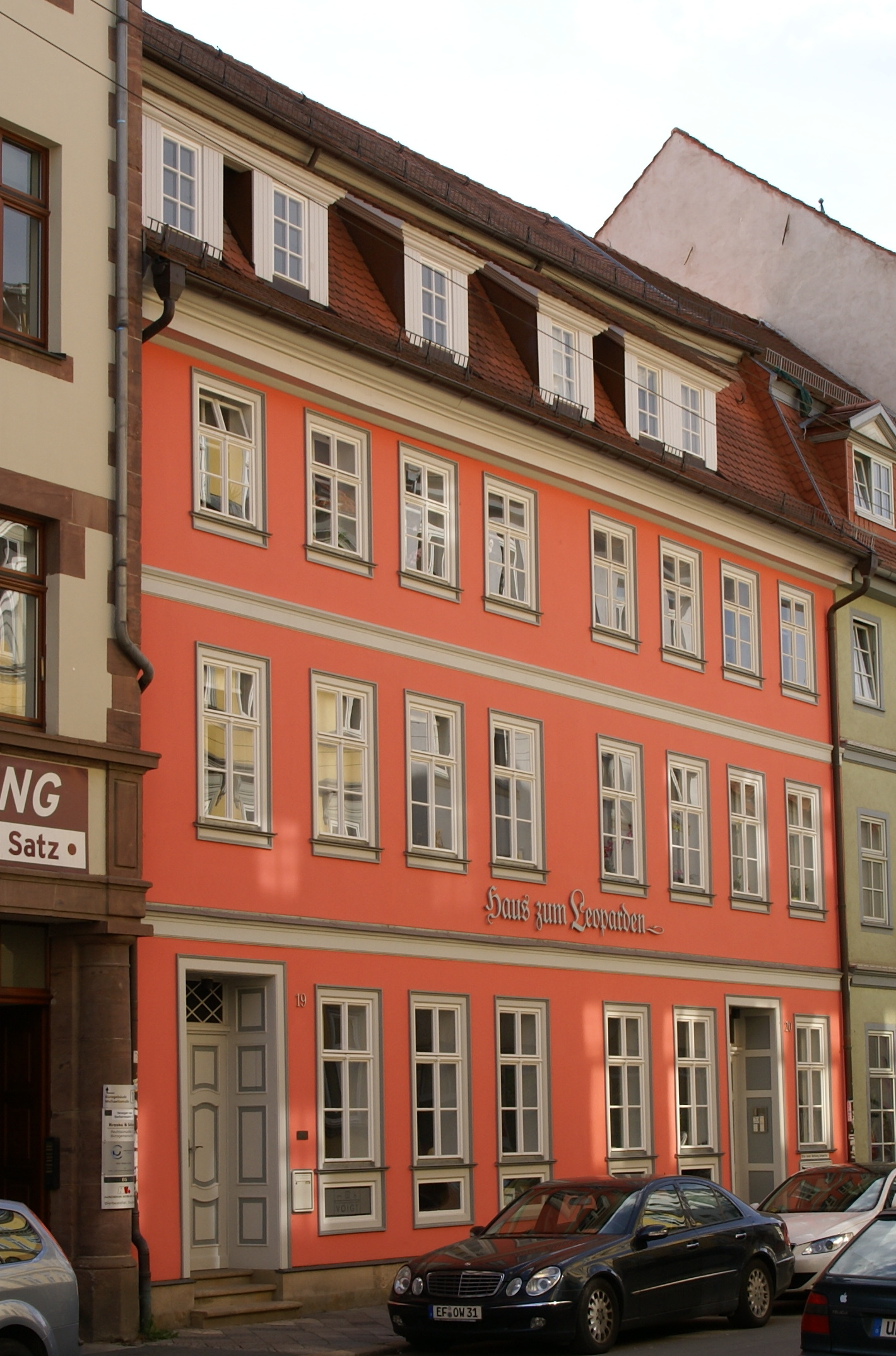
Haus zum Leoparden, Erfurt

She led the initial restoration of most houses on the unique Krämerbrücke in Erfurt; other projects were the house Zur Hohenlilie, the Barfüßerkirche, the Angermuseum, the Predigerkirche and Predigerkloster, the Reglerkirche, the old university, houses in the Michaelisstraße and at the Domplatz, the Krönbacken, the Michaeliskirche, and Schloss Molsdorf. Her projects included around 50 more churches, estates and houses throughout Thuringia.

At the age of 80, Menzel-Jordan undertook her last project, the general renovation of the family-owned house at Michaelisstraße 19/20 in Erfurt's old town. During the development work, archaeological investigations revealed that the house was the oldest documented residential building in Erfurt's old town, built in the late 13th century.

On 10 September 2016, Menzel-Jordan celebrated a service for her 100th birthday in the Erfurt Michaeliskirche with many companions and guests at the invitation of the Erfurt Church District of the Evangelical Church of Central Germany.

She lived at the Augusta-Viktoria-Stift in Erfurt from 2021, an institution that she supported as a child and as a curator of the foundation from 1957 to 1994, responsible for building and restoration matters. On 6 June 2024, she became an honorary citizen of Erfurt.

Menzel-Jordan died on 1 March 2026, at the age of 109. She was the oldest member of the Thuringian Chamber of Architects.

== Gallery ==
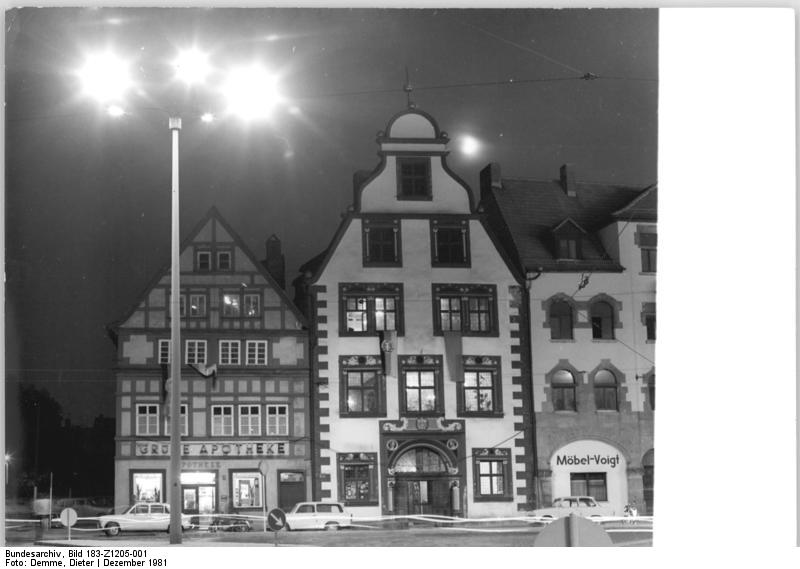
Haus zur hohen Lilie, Erfurt, in 1981

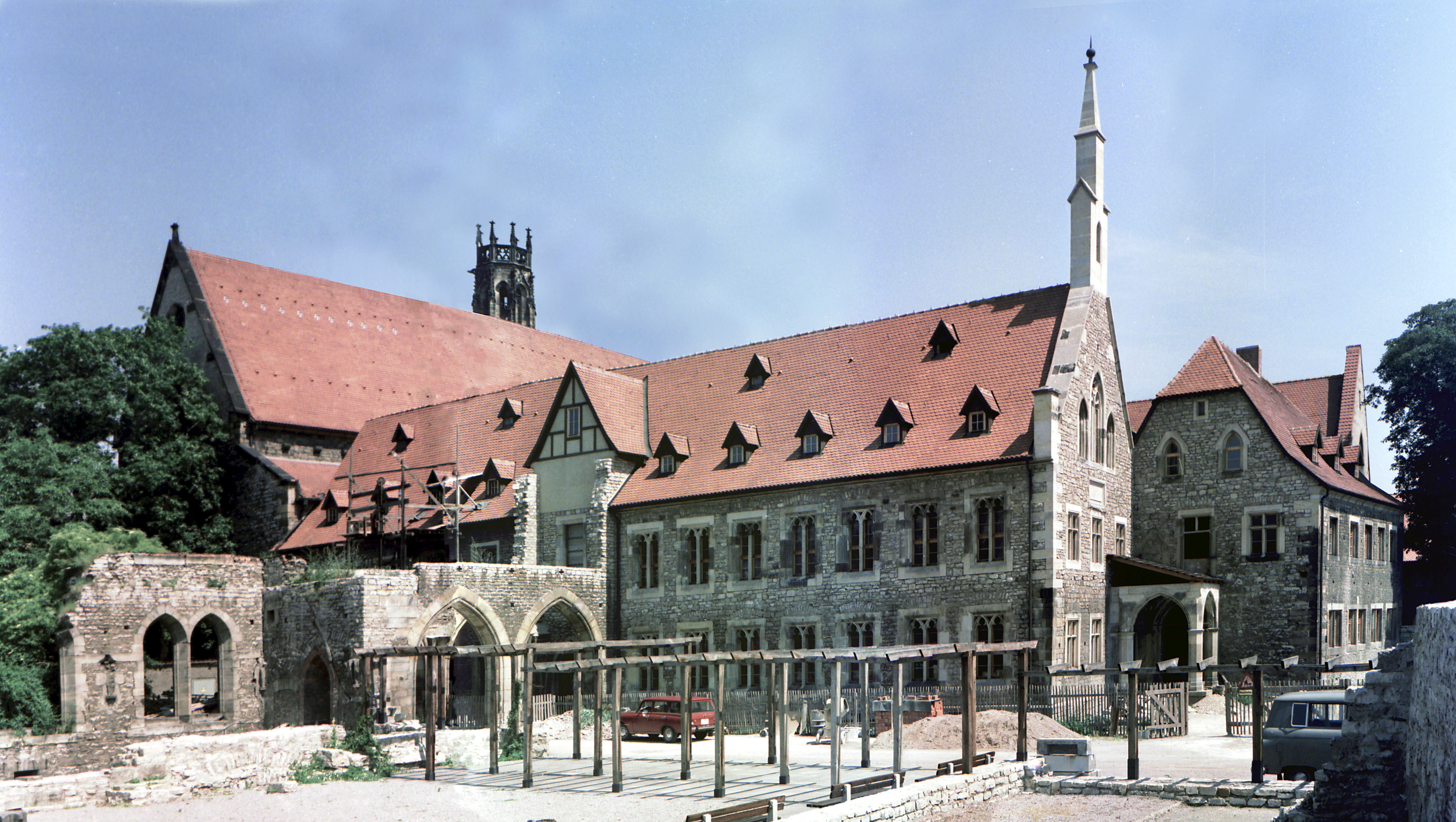
Augustinerkloster, Erfurt, in 1985

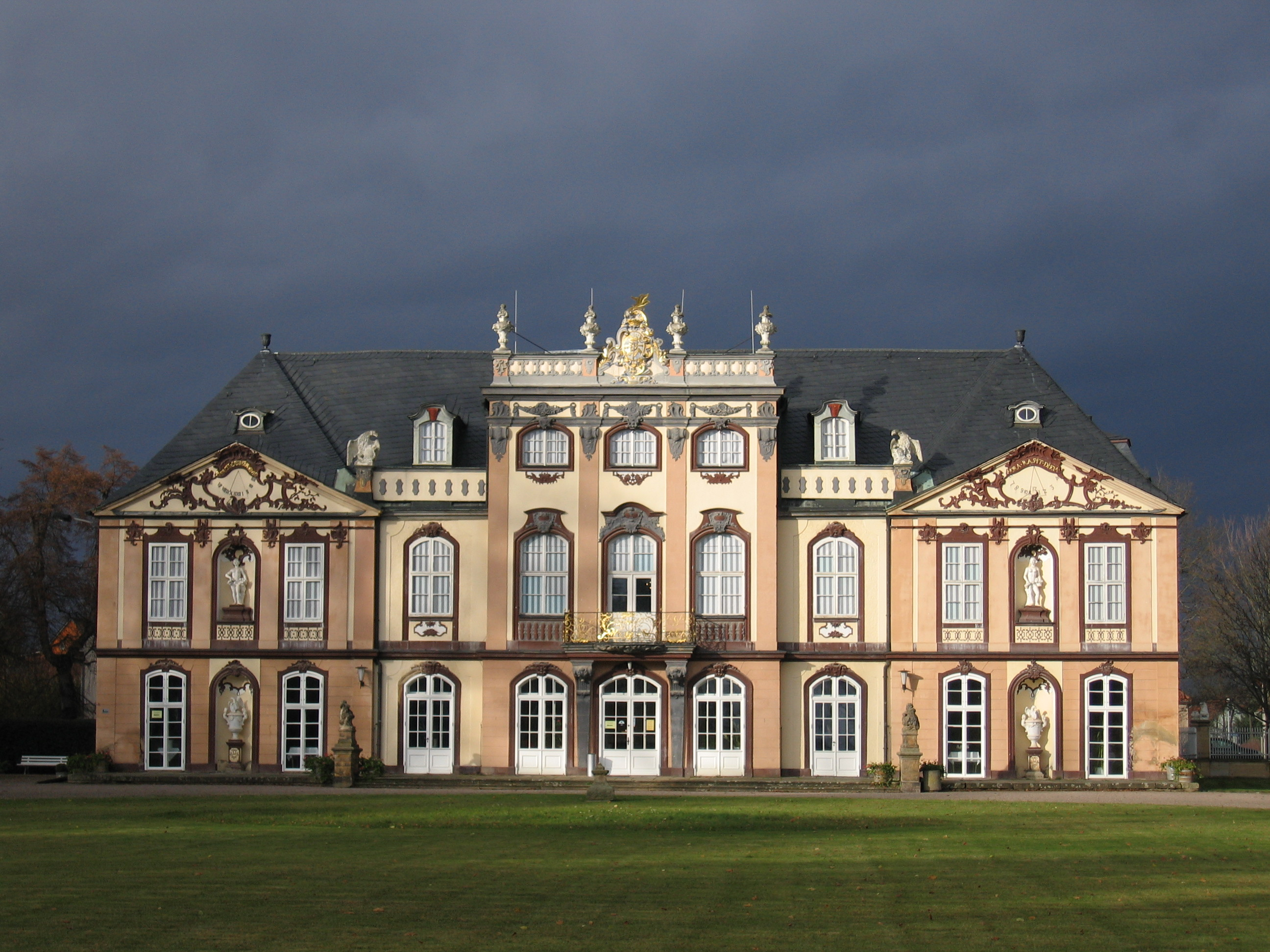
Schloss Molsdorf

== Publications ==
- Erfurt, eine Stadt der Wassermühlen. Untersuchung über die Art und Form der mittelalterlichen Mühlen in Erfurt sowie die Bedingung ihrer Existenz. (dissertation), Technische Hochschule Dresden, 1955.
- Zur Erneuerung der Predigerkirche in Erfurt. In: Kunst und Kirche. 1966, No. 1, pp. 33–39.
