= Neck ditch =

Partial dry moat of a castle

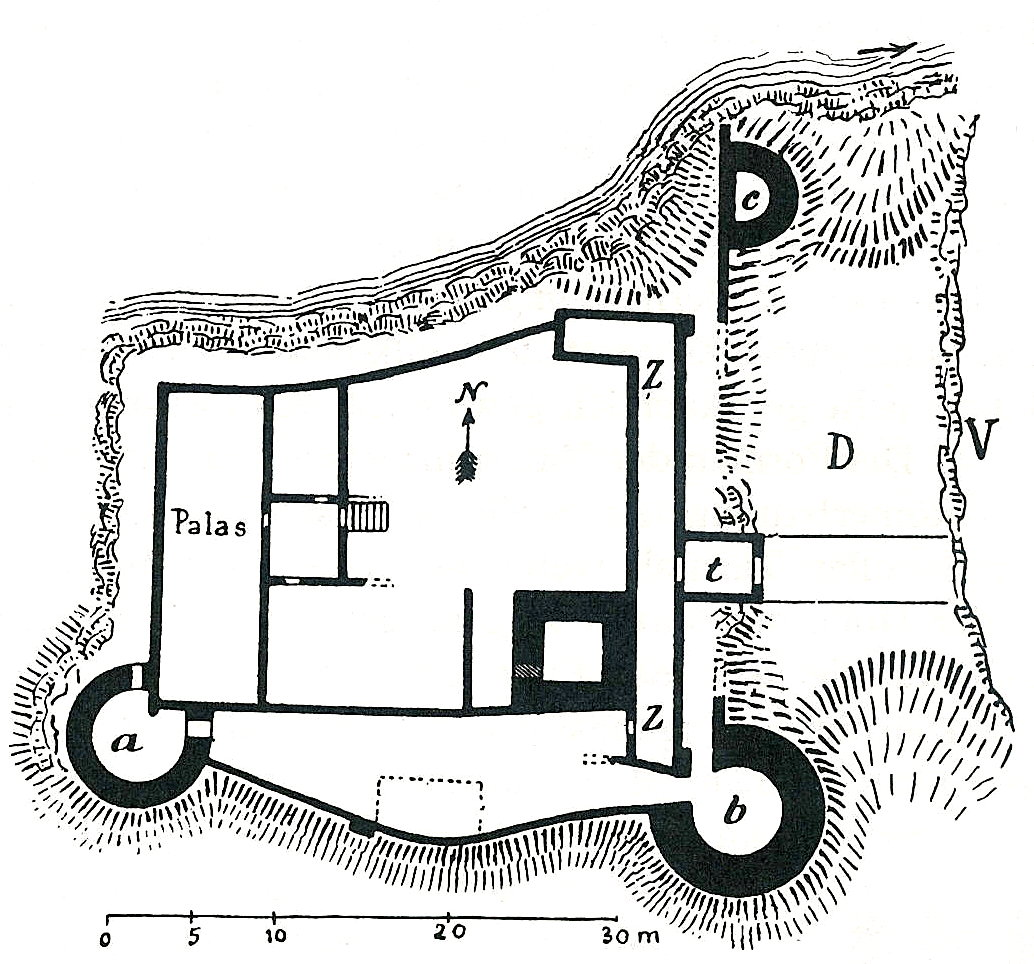
Plan of Rudelsburg castle with its neck ditch (D)

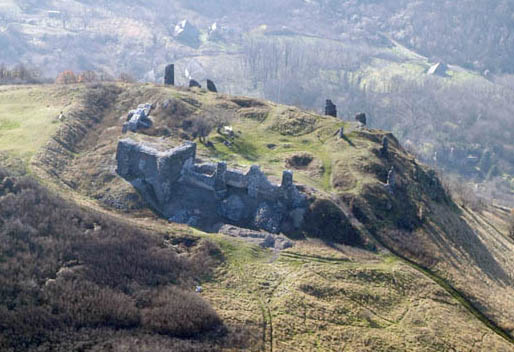
L-shaped neck ditch at Csobánc castle (Hungary)

A neck ditch (German: Halsgraben), sometimes called a throat ditch, is a dry moat that does not fully surround a castle, but only bars the side that is not protected by natural obstacles. It is often an important element in the defensive system of hill castles, especially in Germany and other parts of Central Europe.

Originally, the term neck ditch was only applied to spur castles. These were sited on hill spurs where three sides of the castle were protected by steep hillsides. Realistically they could only be attacked from the direction of the higher ground of the hill itself. The castle would therefore be separated from the rest of the hill by a dry ditch or moat which, for practical reasons, was cut across the narrowest part of the spur, the "bottleneck", hence the name. The castle was then only accessible over a bridge – usually a drawbridge.

Today the term neck bridge is also used for other types of castles, where there is a deep, dry moat on one or two sides, whilst the other sides are protected by inaccessible terrain. For example, a ditch may be cut across the neck of a spit or peninsula in the case of a lowland castle that is otherwise surrounded by water.

Many old neck ditches have since become thickly overgrown and may only be made out with some difficulty.

Examples of castles with neck ditches in the classical sense are Liebenstein, Rochlitz, Kriebstein and Isenburg.

If other parts of a castle, such as the outer and inner wards, are separated with such moats, they are known as cross ditches (German: Abschnittsgraben).

== See also ==
- Cross dyke - a prehistoric ditch, typically found in Britain, cut across a spur for a variety of reasons and sometimes in association with a hill fort

== Literature ==
- Horst Wolfgang Böhme, Reinhard Friedrich, Barbara Schock-Werner (ed.): Wörterbuch der Burgen, Schlösser und Festungen. Reclam, Stuttgart 2004, ISBN 3-15-010547-1, p. 145–146.
- Friedrich-Wilhelm Krahe: Burgen des deutschen Mittelalters. Grundriss-Lexikon. Flechsig, Würzburg 2000, ISBN 3-88189-360-1, p. 24.
