= Goethe Museum =

Goethe Museum may refer to:

- Frankfurt Goethe Museum, Frankfurt am Main, Germany, see Goethe House
- Goethe-Nationalmuseum, Weimar, Germany
- Goethe-Museum (Düsseldorf), Düsseldorf, Germany, see Schloss Jägerhof
