= Bocksberg Castle =

Bocksberg
- Schleid (Rhön)
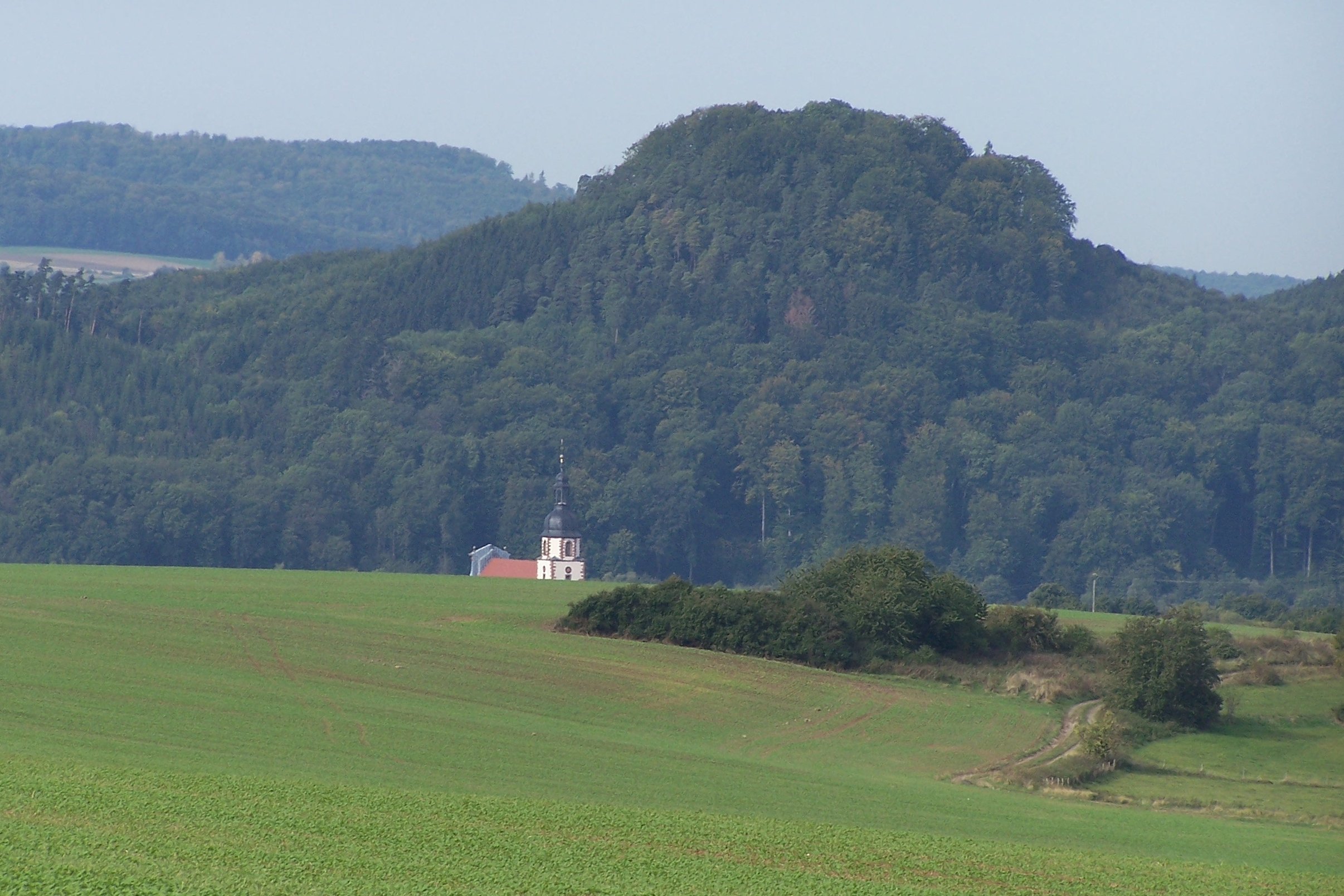
- View of the mountain from the east, including the tower of the baroque church of Schleid.

Site information
- Type: hill castle, summit location
- Code: DE-TH
- Condition: burgstall (no above-ground ruins)

Location
- Coordinates: 50°41′48″N 9°56′26″E
- Height: 422.5 m above sea level (NN)

Garrison information
- Occupants: Adel

Bocksberg is a levelled, medieval hilltop castle on the top of the cone-shaped hill of Bocksberg (422.5 m above NN) in the Rhön Mountains near Geisa and Schleid.

== Story ==
The castle is believed to be the seat of the Lords of Schleid, who played an important role in the Upper Ulster Valley in the High and Late Middle Ages. At that time, the original parish of the Ulster Valley was in Schleid. The aristocratic families of the Rockenstuhl office belonged to the "Buchian nobility", they were vassals of the Fulda monastery and served the respective abbots as warriors, administrators and judges. In the 1960s, a small excavation was carried out by conservationists from the district of Bad Salzungen. Pottery, brick and mortar remains were recovered.

== Description ==
No discernable remains of the castle have survived. Today, a crucifix stands as a summit cross on the summit plateau. The footpath to the top was probably the original drive to the castle, winding its way clockwise around the hill. The conical hill rises steeply from the floor of the valley and is situated near the Rockenstuhl to the south on which another castle was sited until the time of the Thirty Years' War. The official seat was then moved to Geisa just 2 kilometres north of the Bocksberg. In addition to its significance for the lords of Schleid, the Bocksberg was militarily important to those local towns. In addition, the main driveway between Geisa and the Rockenstuhl led along the eastern slope of the Bocksberg.

== Literature ==
- Adelbert Schröter: Land an der Straße. Die Geschichte der katholischen Pfarreien in der thüringischen Rhön. 3rd edn. St.-Benno-Verlag, Leipzig 1989, ISBN 3-7462-0430-5.
