= Heilingen =

Coordinates: 50.767°N 11.467°E

Heilingen is a former municipality in the district Saalfeld-Rudolstadt, in Thuringia, Germany. Since 1 December 2007, it is part of the municipality Uhlstädt-Kirchhasel. As of 31 December 2006, it had 336 inhabitants.
