= Hohnstein Castle =

German castle ruins

- Burg Hohnstein
- Neustadt
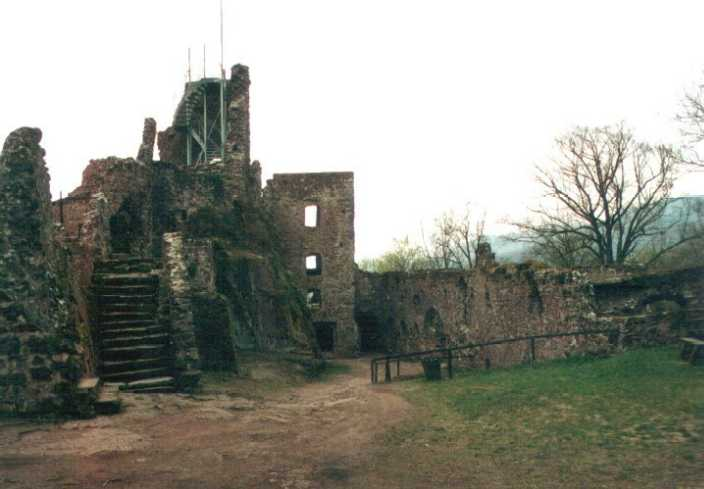
- Ruins of Hohnstein Castle

Site information
- Type: Hill castle, converted into palace
- Owner: counts
- Condition: ruins

Location
- Coordinates: 51°34′12″N 10°50′15″E
- Height: 403 m above sea level (NN)

Site history
- Built: Around 1120
- Materials: rubble stone

Hohnstein Castle (German: Burg Hohnstein) is one of the largest and best-preserved castle ruins in Germany and is located near Neustadt in the vicinity of Nordhausen in Thuringia.

== Location ==
The ruins are located on a high, rocky spur which today is covered in woods, about 1 km northeast of the village of Neustadt on the southern edge of the Harz mountains.

== History ==
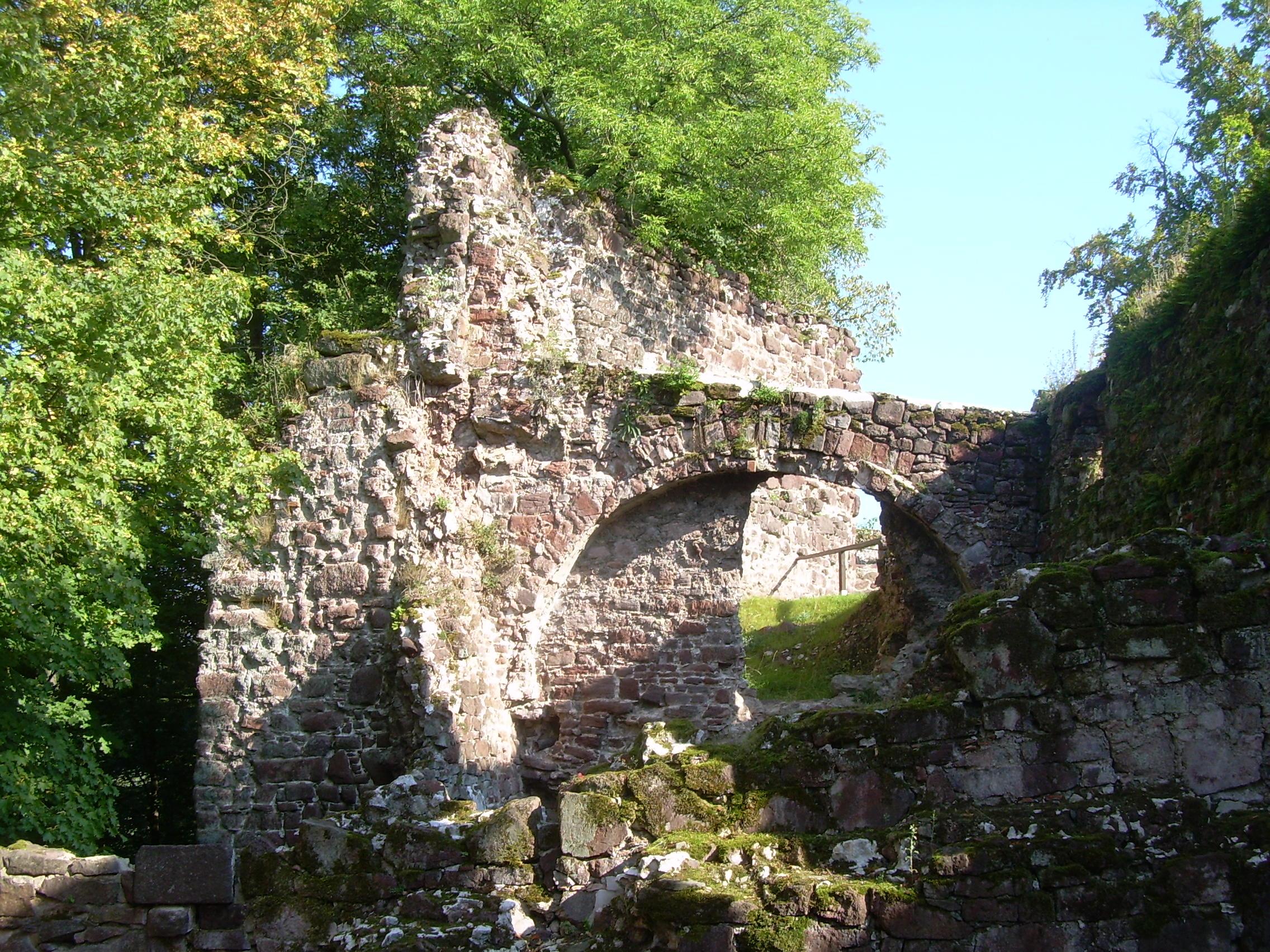
An arch, part of the Hohnstein ruins

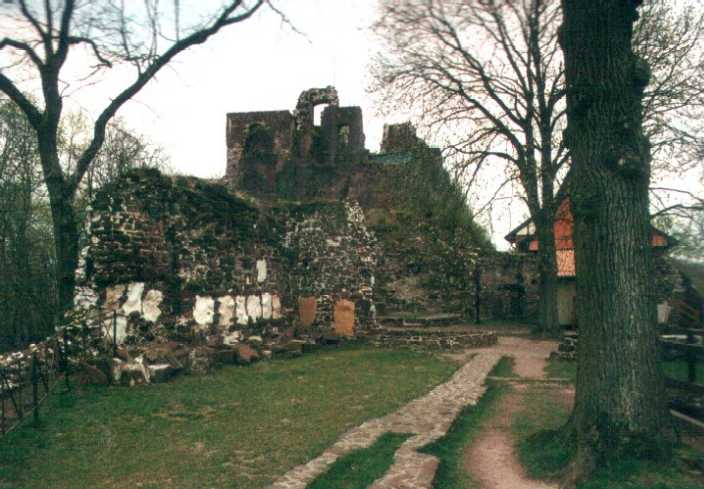
The ruins of Hohnstein Castle

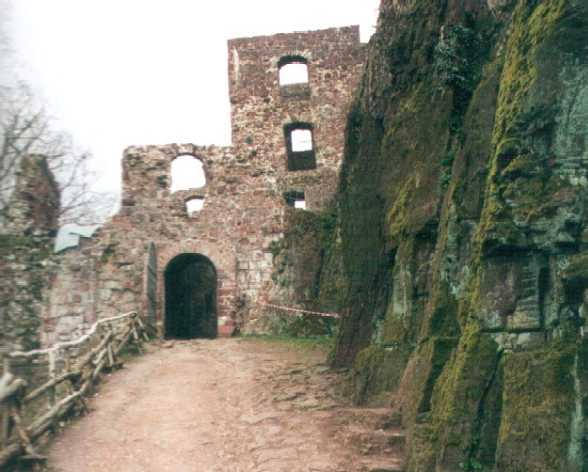
Hohnstein Castle – entranceway

Honstein Castle was built in the time of the Hohenstaufen-Guelph conflict for the throne. Its foundation is attributed to Konrad von Sangerhausen, a relative of the legendary Thuringian count, Louis the Springer.

The Counts of Hohnstein, together with the Counts of Ilefeld who had married into them, inherited the lordship of the South Harz from Konrad. The newly founded dynasty of the Honstein-Ilfeld counts introduced the family Christian name, Elger, and chose Honstein Castle as their family seat; the modest Ilburg in nearby Ilfeld was probably abandoned at this point in time. The first mention of Honstein Castle was in 1202. Like the Thuringian landgraves, the Honstein clan rapidly amassed a considerable amount of territory, which included the regions around Arnstadt and Gotha in the Thuringian Basin. The first boom period for the family during the 13th century was followed by a loss of importance when, in 1315, the estate was divided between several family lines. Honstein Castle soon became militarily outdated. In 1380 it was captured for the first time and then again in 1412 during a family dispute, which degenerated into the so-called Flegler War, during the course of which the Hohnstein counts lost their family castle.

During the Peasants' War, Honstein was still seen as a secure fortification and was therefore selected by the abbott of Ilfeld Abbey to protect himself and the abbey treasure. Whilst the Counts of Hohnstein saw out the end of their reign at Lohra Castle (they died out in 1593), Hohnstein Castle was sold into the possession of the Counts of Stolberg, who modernised the fort militarily and structurally at great expense (including an artillery tower) and turned it into a typical Renaissance Schloss. During this period it became one of the largest castles in the Harz.

During the Thirty Years War, however, Hohnstein Castle was destroyed by fire. Having been requisitioned in 1627 by an imperial officer, Colonel du Vuer, troops from the Electorate of Saxony under Lieutenant Colonel Vitztum von Eckstedt stormed the castle and drove out the imperial forces. Because Vitztum knew that he could not hold the castle for any length of time he placed the Counts of Stolberg under pressure so that he could extort money from them in return for handing it over. The Stollbergs could not (or would not) meet this ultimatum, so Vitztum had his soldiers set fire to the already heavily plundered castle on Christmas Eve of 1627. According to tradition, Vitztum knew how to foil every attempt by guards on duty to put the fires out. Only a few usable remnants could be recovered from the blackened ruins following the withdrawal of Vitztum's troops; these included the clock from the castle chapel and the altar of the palace chapel. In the course of the following decades and centuries the castle ruins continued to decay. In 1908 an inn was built below the ruins. After 1990 safety and restoration work on the castle ruins was started. In Easter 2001 the castle was once again re-occupied.

== Site ==
The ruins of Hohnstein Castle may be visited without a guide. It has a checkpoint (No. 98) on the Harzer Wandernadel hiking trail network by the cafe just beyond the gateway.

== See also ==
- List of castles in Thuringia
