= Goethe House (Weimar) =

Building in Weimar, Germany

Coordinates: 50°58′39″N 11°19′43″E

UNESCO World Heritage Site
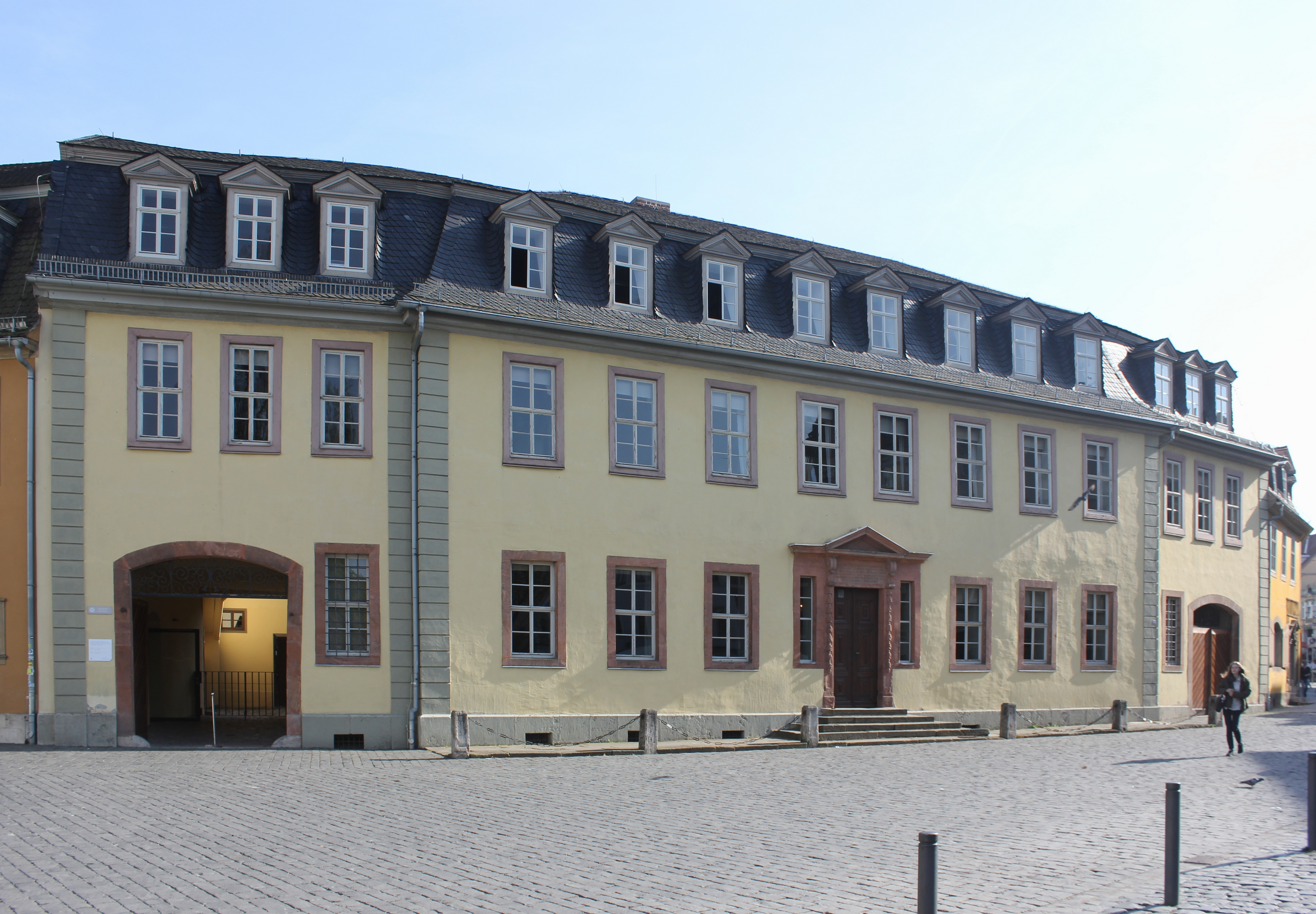
- Goethe House

- Location within Thuringia Location within Germany
- Location: Weimar, Germany
- Part of: Classical Weimar
- Criteria: Cultural: (iii), (vi)
- Reference: 846
- Inscription: 1998 (22nd Session)

The Goethe House (Goethes Wohnhaus) is a building located in Weimar, Germany. It is the primary house lived in by the influential writer, poet, and statesman Johann Wolfgang von Goethe from 1782 to 1832 (although he did live in several others in the town). The house was built in 1709 by Georg Caspar Helmershausen. However, the rooms were personally redesigned by Goethe once he arrived in Weimar to reflect the ideals of the burgeoning Weimar Classicism movement, in which Goethe was especially prominent. Many of the original furnishings are still present in the house.

Adjacent to the house is a garden, which primarily served to provide produce for Goethe's family, including asparagus, artichokes, apricots, and grapes. In 1817, Goethe extended the garden to the east and built a pavilion to store his mineral collection.

The home serves as the main location of the Goethe-Nationalmuseum, and in 1998 it was inscribed on the UNESCO World Heritage List along with other buildings and sites associated with Weimar Classicism, because of their exceptional architecture and testimony to Weimar's influence as a cultural hub during the late 18th and 19th centuries.
