= Großkochberg =

Coordinates: 50°47′N 11°22′E

Großkochberg is a former municipality in the district Saalfeld-Rudolstadt, in Thuringia, Germany. Since 1 December 2007, it is part of the municipality Uhlstädt-Kirchhasel.
