= Funkenburg =

Mountain in Germany

Coordinates: 51°04′N 14°24′E

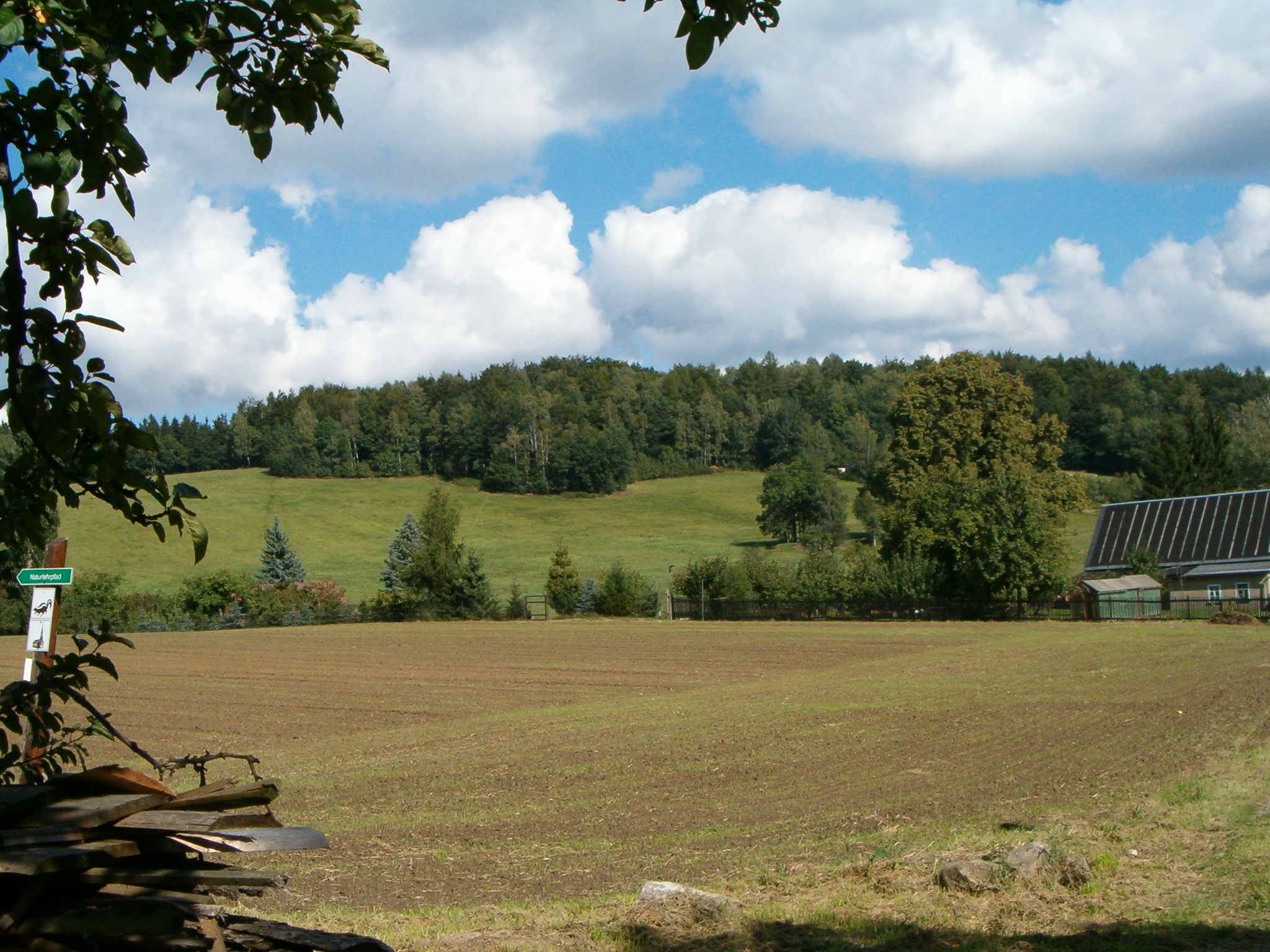
- Funkenburg

Highest point
- Elevation: 376 m (1,234 ft)

Geography
- Location: Saxony, Germany

Funkenburg is a mountain in the Lusatian Highlands in the Bautzen district of Saxony, southeastern Germany. It is near the border to the Czech republic.
