= Goethe-Nationalmuseum =

Museum in Weimar

Coordinates: 50°58′39″N 11°19′43″E

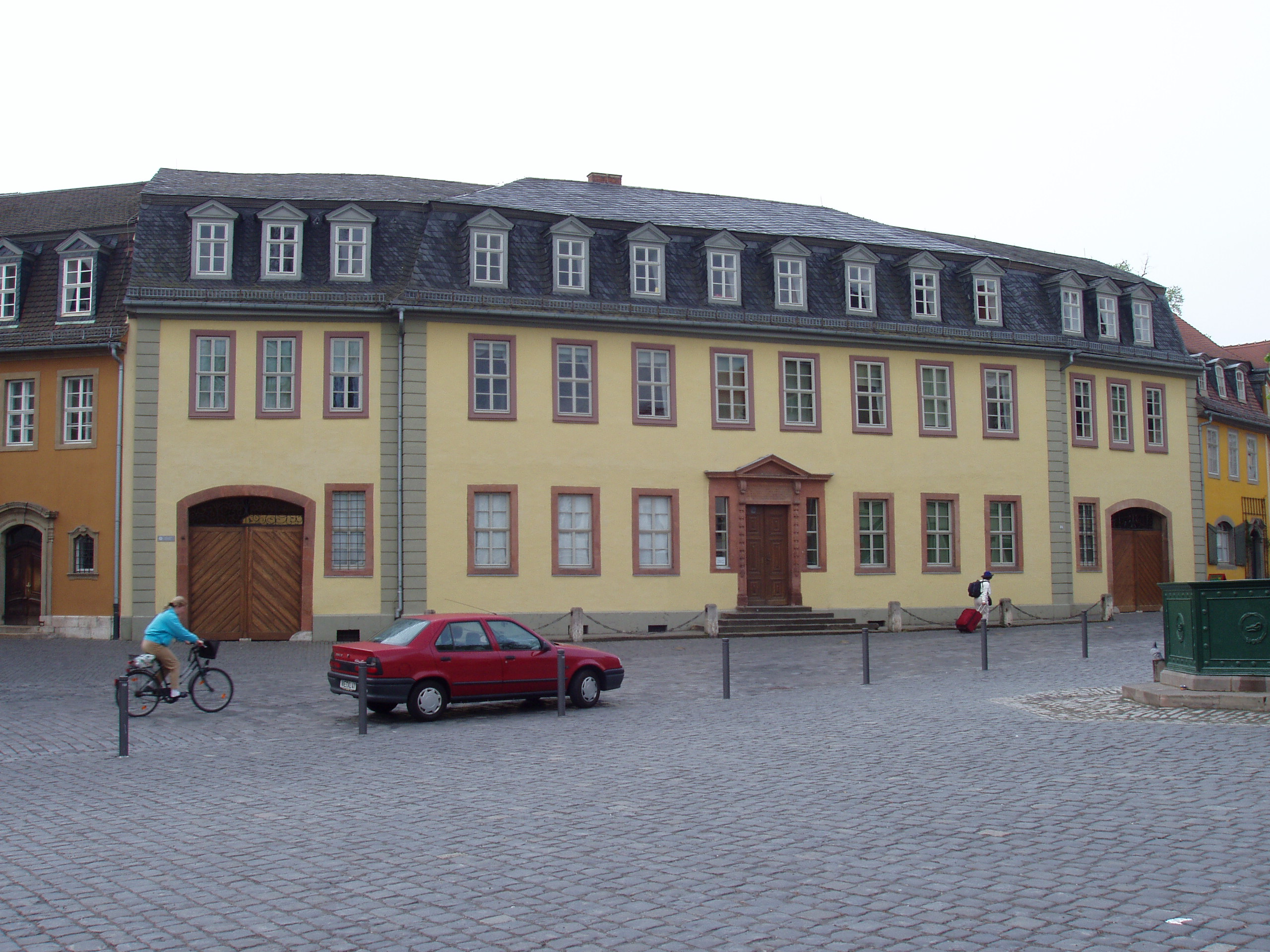
The Goethe home and National Museum in Weimar

Goethe-Nationalmuseum, Weimar

The Goethe-Nationalmuseum is a museum devoted to the German author Johann Wolfgang von Goethe, in the town of Weimar in Germany. Originally comprising the Goethe House, where Goethe lived intermittently for 50 years from 1782 to 1832, the museum was founded on 8 August 1885 as a result of the will of Goethe's last living heir, his grandson Walther von Goethe, who left the Goethe House to the state.

After the Land of Thuringia was formed, the Goethe-Nationalmuseum, along with several buildings erected during the classical age and the Weimar palaces, became the property of Thuringia. In the 1920s, more Weimar buildings were assigned to the Goethe-Nationalmuseum. In 1953, these buildings became the property of the "Nationale Forschungs- und Gedenkstätten der klassischen deutschen Literatur in Weimar, NFG" (national research establishments and memorials of German classical literature in Weimar). Since October 1991, the Goethe-Nationalmuseum belongs to the "Klassik Stiftung Weimar" (foundation of Weimar classicism) which succeeded the NFG. It administers the main house and 22 other historical houses and museums throughout and around the Weimar municipal area.

== Exhibits and research ==
The Goethe-Nationalmuseum consists of Goethe's residential building and the "Goethe-Museum". This museum is situated in an extension that was built in 1935 next to the house. The exhibits largely consist of Goethe's collections in the domains of arts and natural science, his library, and about 2,000 drawings he did himself. The collection comprises about 100,000 exhibits and focuses on the period of Weimar Classicism.

In Goethe's residential building, situated at the Weimar place "Frauenplan", visitors can view the rooms in which he and his wife, Christiane Vulpius, lived, at Goethe's study and library, the reception room, the rooms where the art collection was stored, and the garden. The house also contains research facilities, including the "Studiensaal", an institution used during the age of Goethe which is similar to a congress or conference centre today. In 1998 the house was inscribed on the UNESCO World Heritage List along with other buildings and sites associated with Weimar Classicism, because of their exceptional architecture and testimony to Weimar's influence as a cultural hub during the late 18th and 19th centuries.
