= Schkölen Castle =

Burg Schkölen
- Schkölen
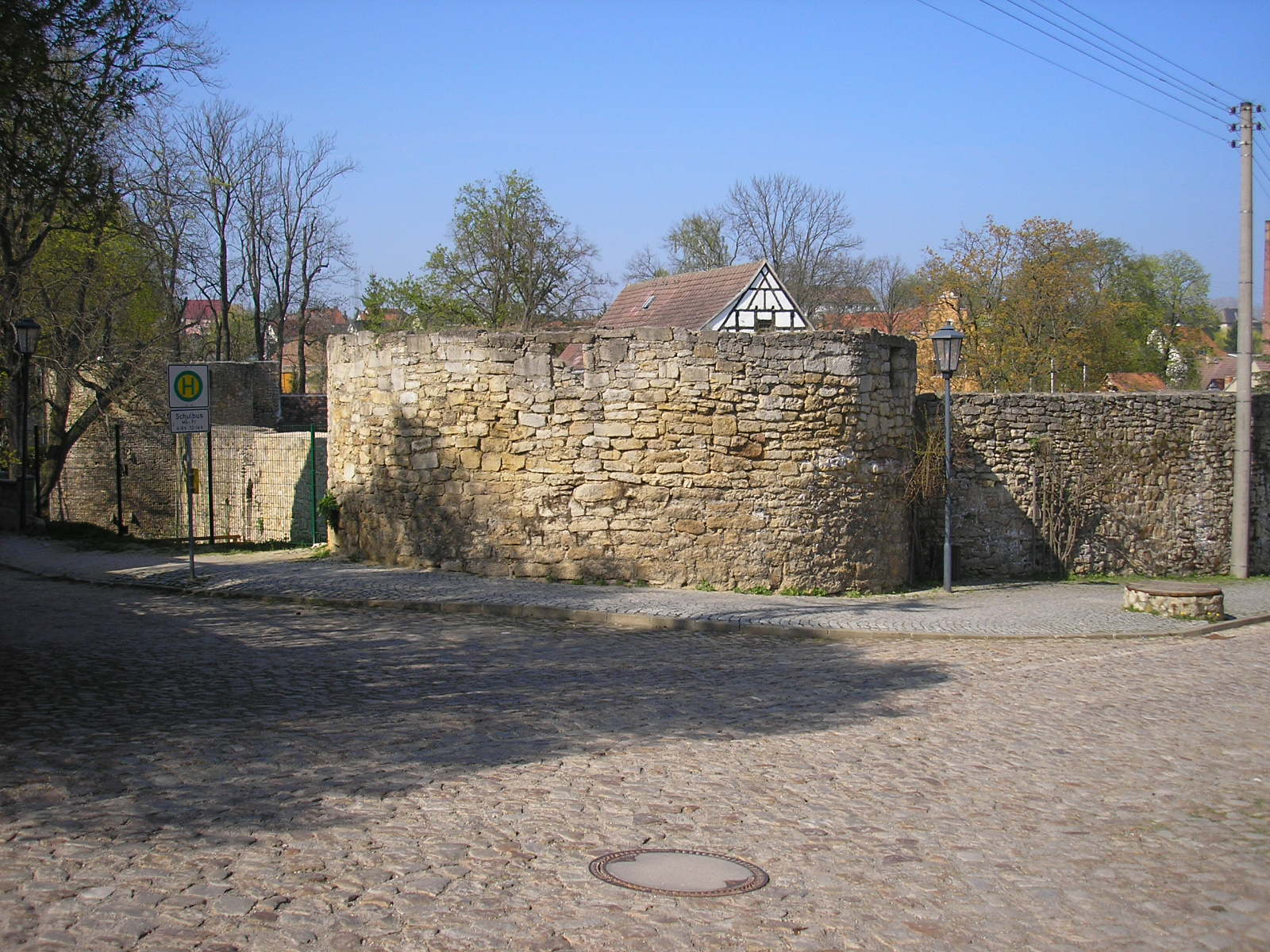
- Schkölen Water Castle

Site information
- Type: lowland castle
- Code: DE-TH
- Condition: Building elements and defences

Location
- Coordinates: 51°02′31″N 11°49′10″E
- Height: 210 m above sea level (NHN)

Site history
- Built: 900 to 1000
- Materials: timber-framed

Garrison information
- Occupants: nobility, counts

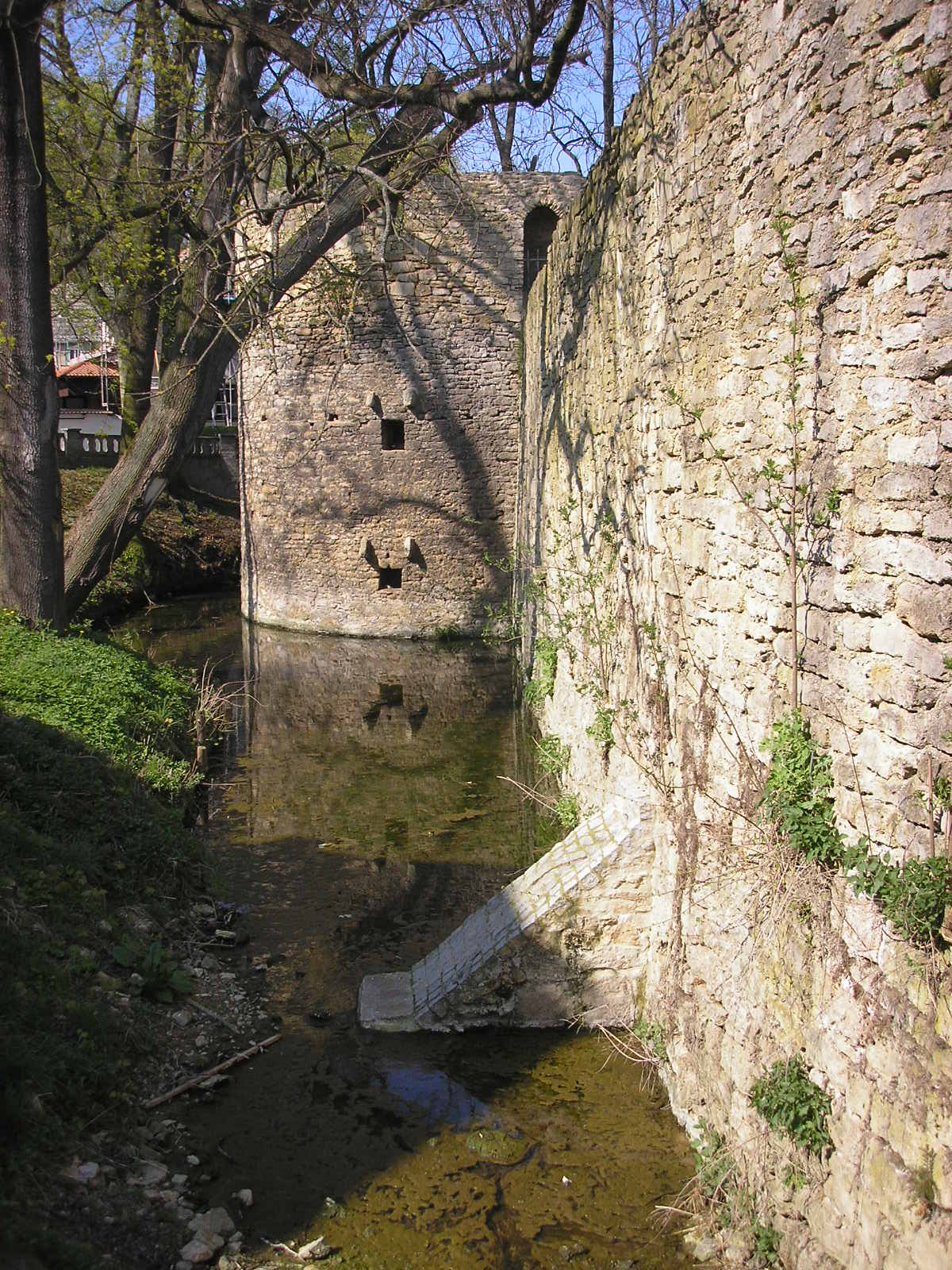
Moat

Schkölen Castle (German: Burg Schkölen) is a partially preserved water castle stand at a height of 210 metres above sea level (NN) in the centre (Ringstraße 9) of the town of Schkölen in the county of Saale-Holzland-Kreis in the German state of Thuringia. Until 1977 the ruins of the water castle lay almost forgotten and overgrown with briars in the middle of the little town.

== History ==
The foundation of the water castle probably goes back to a Slavic ringwork from the 10th century.

In 1031, the burgward of Szolin is first mentioned. In the 15th century, the castle was extended, but burnt down in 1536 and fell into ruins. In the 19th century, the castle acted as a forestry office and, in 1968 and 1989, excavations took place.

The former owners at the end of the 11th century were Count Wiprecht of Groitzsch, in 1158 Henry the Bavarian and in the 15th century, the Lords of Bünau.

The castle was a fort-like, rectangular structure with a two-storey timber-framed house and round tower.

== Literature ==
- Thomas Bienert (2000), Mittelalterliche Burgen in Thüringen. 430 Burgen, Burgruinen und Burgstätten (in German), Gudensberg-Gleichen: Wartberg-Verlag, pp. 205: Burgruine Schkölen, ISBN 3-86134-631-1
- Michael Köhler (2001), Thüringer Burgen und befestigte vor- und frühgeschichtliche Wohnplätze (in German), Jena: Jenzig-Verlag Köhler, pp. 223–224: Schkölen, ISBN 3-910141-43-9
- Hans Maresch, Doris Maresch: Burgen und Schlösser (= Sehenswertes Thüringen). VHT – Verlags-Haus Thüringen, Erfurt 1997, ISBN 3-89683-105-4.
