= Uhlstädt-Kirchhasel =

- Municipality
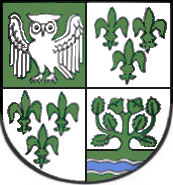
- Coat of arms

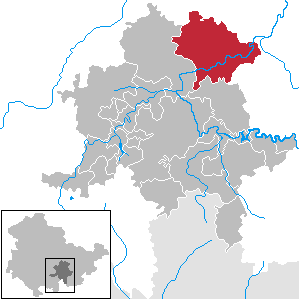
- Location of Uhlstädt-Kirchhasel within Saalfeld-Rudolstadt district
- Interactive map of Uhlstädt-Kirchhasel
- Location within Germany Location within Thuringia
- Coordinates: 50°44′31″N 11°27′57″E
- Country: Germany
- State: Thuringia
- District: Saalfeld-Rudolstadt
- Subdivisions: 32

Government
  - Mayor (2022–28): Frank Dietzel (Left)

Area
  - Total: 121.64 km^{2} (46.97 sq mi)
- Elevation: 169–526 m (554–1,726 ft)

Population (2025-12-31)
  - Total: 5,320
  - Density: 43.7/km^{2} (113/sq mi)
- Time zone: UTC+01:00 (CET)
  - Summer (DST): UTC+02:00 (CEST)
- Postal codes: 07407
- Dialling codes: 036742,036743,03672
- Vehicle registration: SLF
- Website: www.uhlstaedt-kirchhasel.de

Uhlstädt-Kirchhasel (German pronunciation: [ˈuːlʃtɛt ˈkɪʁçhaːzl̩]) is a municipality in the district Saalfeld-Rudolstadt, in Thuringia, Germany. On 1 December 2007, the former municipalities Großkochberg and Heilingen were incorporated by Uhlstädt-Kirchhasel. The valley of the river Saale is the centre of Uhlstädt-Kirchhasel. Both Uhlstädt and Kirchhasel are villages inside this valley, which divides the municipality into a northern and a southern part. The nearest bigger towns are Rudolstadt (about 7 km away), Saalfeld (about 11 km away) and Jena (about 25 km away).

The 32 local subdivisions of this municipality are:(inhabitants)

Beutelsdorf(160)	Kirchhasel(610)	Niederkrossen(280)	Schmieden(50)
Catharinau(370)	Kleinkochberg(60)	Oberhasel(100)	Teichweiden(190)
Clöswitz(35)	Kleinkrossen(135)	Oberkrossen(135)	Uhlstädt(950)
Dorndorf(130)	Kolkwitz(190)	Partschefeld(120)	Unterhasel(6)
Engerda(360)	Kuhfraß(140)	Röbschütz(105)	Weißbach(105)
Etzelbach(430)	Mötzelbach(100)	Rödelwitz(95)	Weißen(270)
Großkochberg(580)	Naundorf(65)	Rückersdorf(145)	Weitersdorf(10)
Heilingen(230)	Neusitz(120)	Schloßkulm(75)	Zeutsch(330)

== History ==
The municipality Uhlstädt-Kirchhasel was founded on 1 July 2002 by a voluntary fusion of the municipalities Beutelsdorf, Dorndorf, Engerda, Kirchhasel, Niederkrossen, Rödelwitz, Schloßkulm, Schmieden, Teichweiden, Uhlstädt and Zeutsch, which were independent before this fusion. On 1 December 2007 the municipalities Großkochberg and Heilingen, which were independent until this point too, become also part of the municipality Uhlstädt-Kirchhasel.
