= Schloss Molsdorf =

Palace in Erfurt, Thuringia, Germany

Coordinates: 50°54′2.4″N 10°57′40.7″E

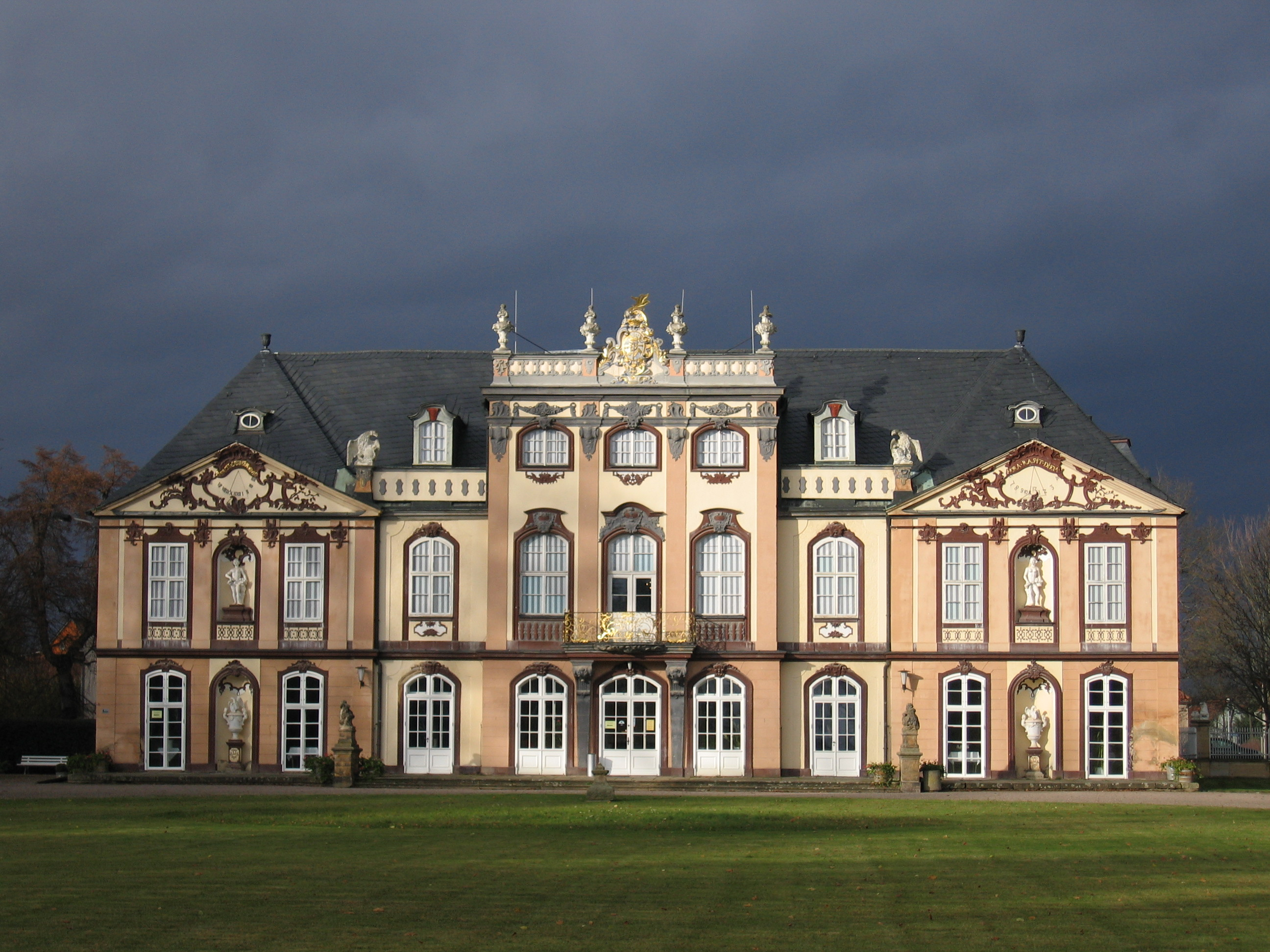
South front in the evening

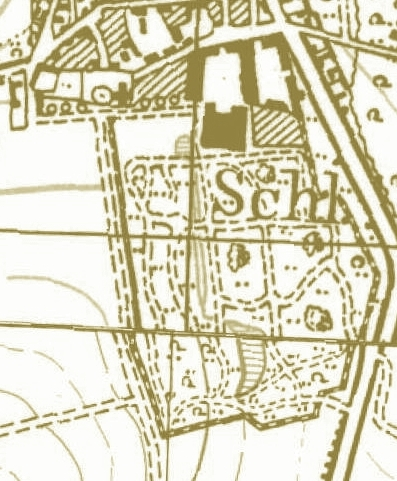
1880 site map

Schloss Molsdorf is a Baroque palace in Molsdorf, now part of Erfurt, the capital of Thuringia, Germany. The palace, around 12 kilometers south of the city, is regarded as one of the most Baroque palaces of the state. It belongs to the Stiftung Thüringer Schlösser und Gärten.

== History ==
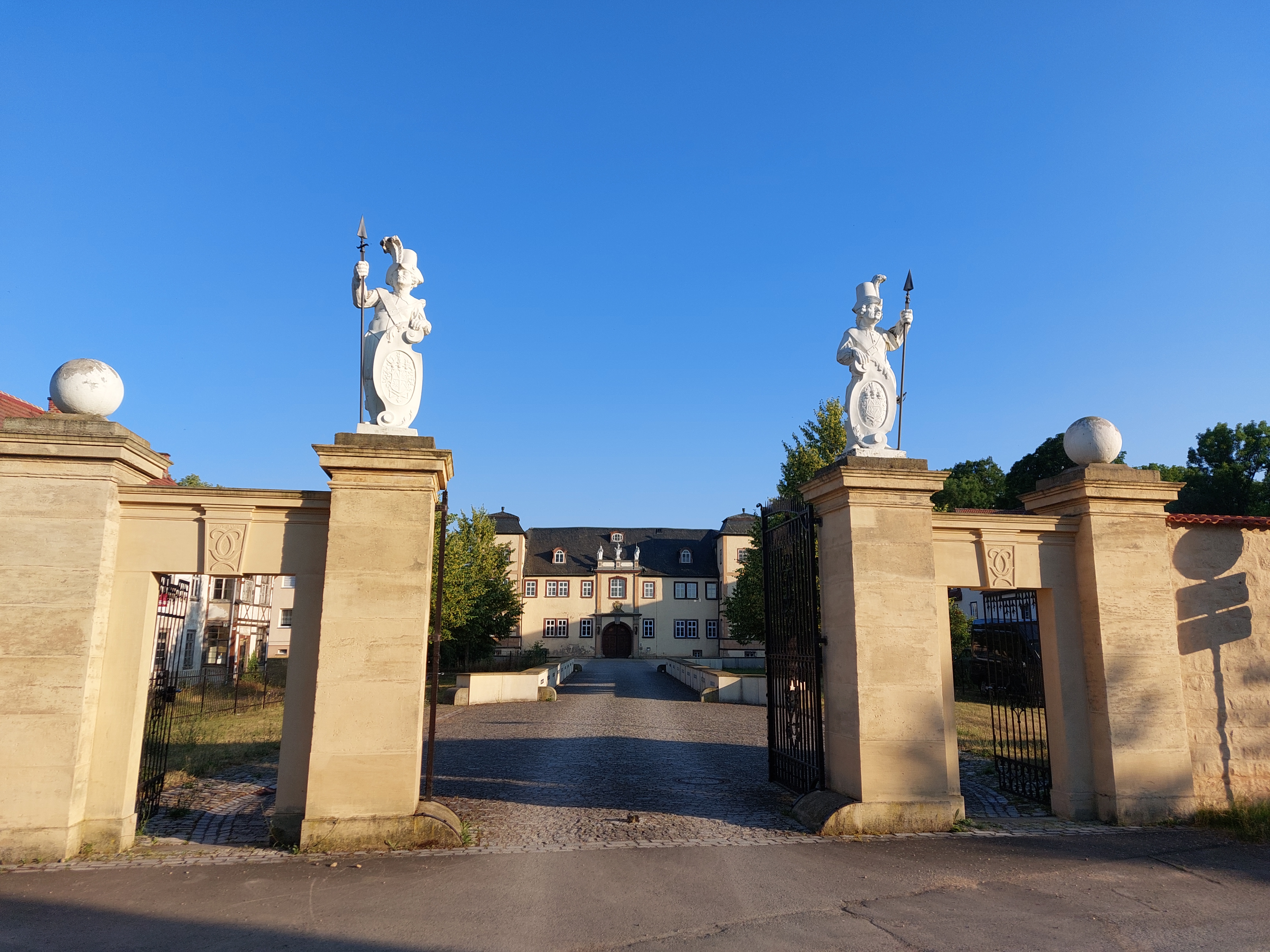
North facade with main entrance

In 1733, Gustav Adolf von Gotter bought a Renaissance palace on the site. He had it transformed into a Baroque palace by Gottfried Heinrich Krohne from 1734 to 1740. The interior design was made by painters Jan Kupecký and Antoine Pesne as well as the stucco master Giovanni Battista Pedrozzi. At the same time, a French garden was built, with several contemporary sculptures.

From 1748, Heinrich Reinhard Freiherr Röder von Schwende, a minister in Württemberg, owned the palace. He sold it to Duke Frederick III. From 1939, the palace belonged to Prussia, and after World War II the city of Erfurt. It was restored from the late 1950s.
