= Schleid =

- Municipality
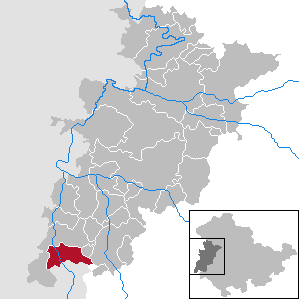
- Location of Schleid within Wartburgkreis district
- Interactive map of Schleid
- Location within Germany Location within Thuringia
- Coordinates: 50°42′N 9°58′E
- Country: Germany
- State: Thuringia
- District: Wartburgkreis

Government
  - Mayor (2020–26): Bernadett Hosenfeld (CDU)

Area
  - Total: 27.72 km^{2} (10.70 sq mi)
- Elevation: 300 m (980 ft)

Population (2025-12-31)
  - Total: 1,008
  - Density: 36.36/km^{2} (94.18/sq mi)
- Time zone: UTC+01:00 (CET)
  - Summer (DST): UTC+02:00 (CEST)
- Postal codes: 36419
- Dialling codes: 036967
- Vehicle registration: WAK

Schleid (German pronunciation: [ʃlaɪt]) is a municipality in the Wartburgkreis district of Thuringia, Germany.
