= Liebenstein Castle (Thuringia) =

Castle in Germany

- Burg Liebenstein
- Liebenstein, Germany
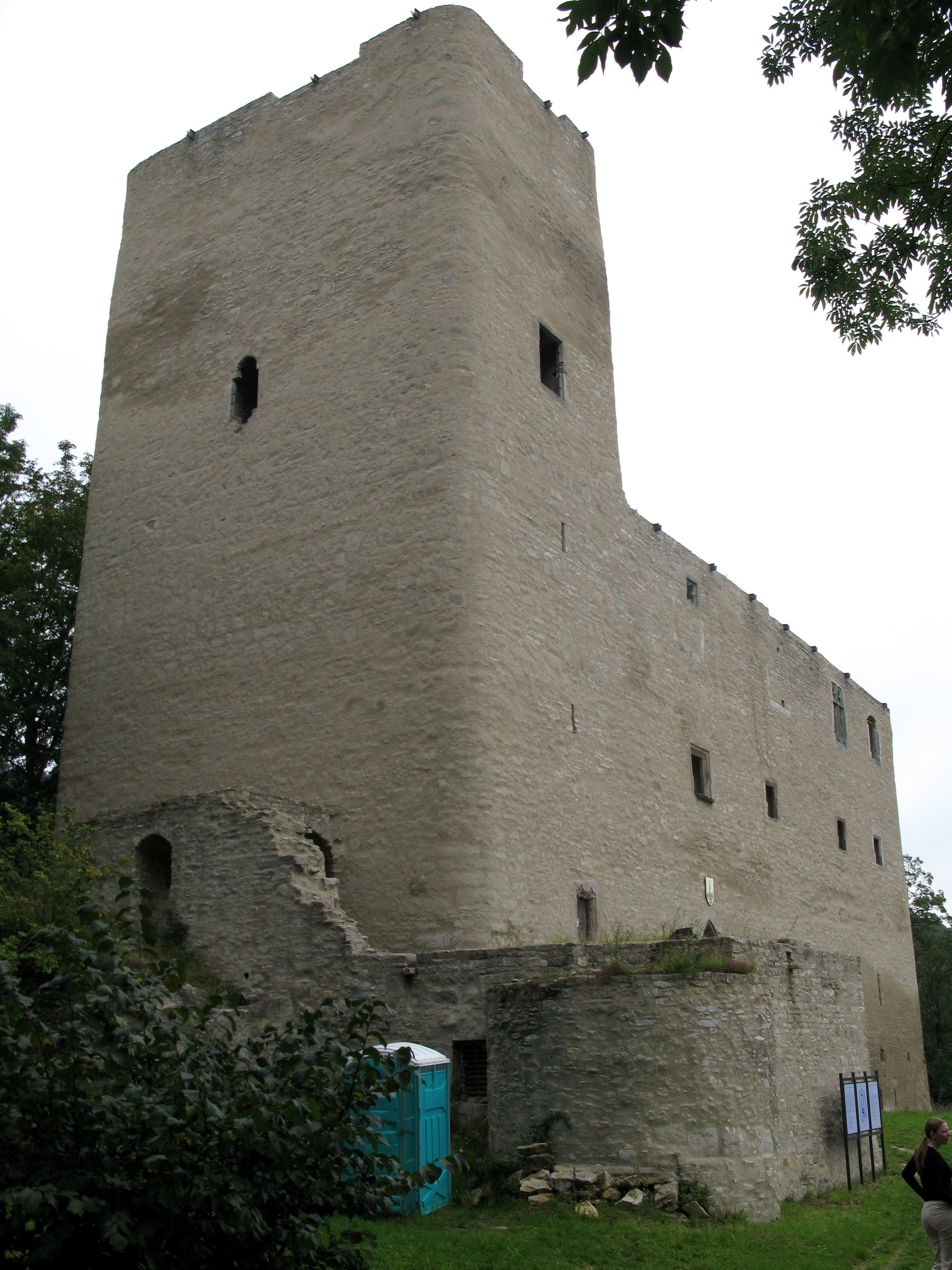

Site information
- Type: castle

Location
- Coordinates: 50.769708°N 10.852915°E

Liebenstein Castle (German: Burg Liebenstein) is a castle in Liebenstein in the Ilm-Kreis, Thuringia, Germany. It was originally built in the 12th century by the counts of Käfernburg; the castellans were the counts' ministeriales, the lords of Liebenstein.

The castle was extensively reconstructed in the 16th century, and subsequently used as a quarry for building-stone.
