= Anton von Schönfeld =

Austro-Hungarian military officer (1827–1898)

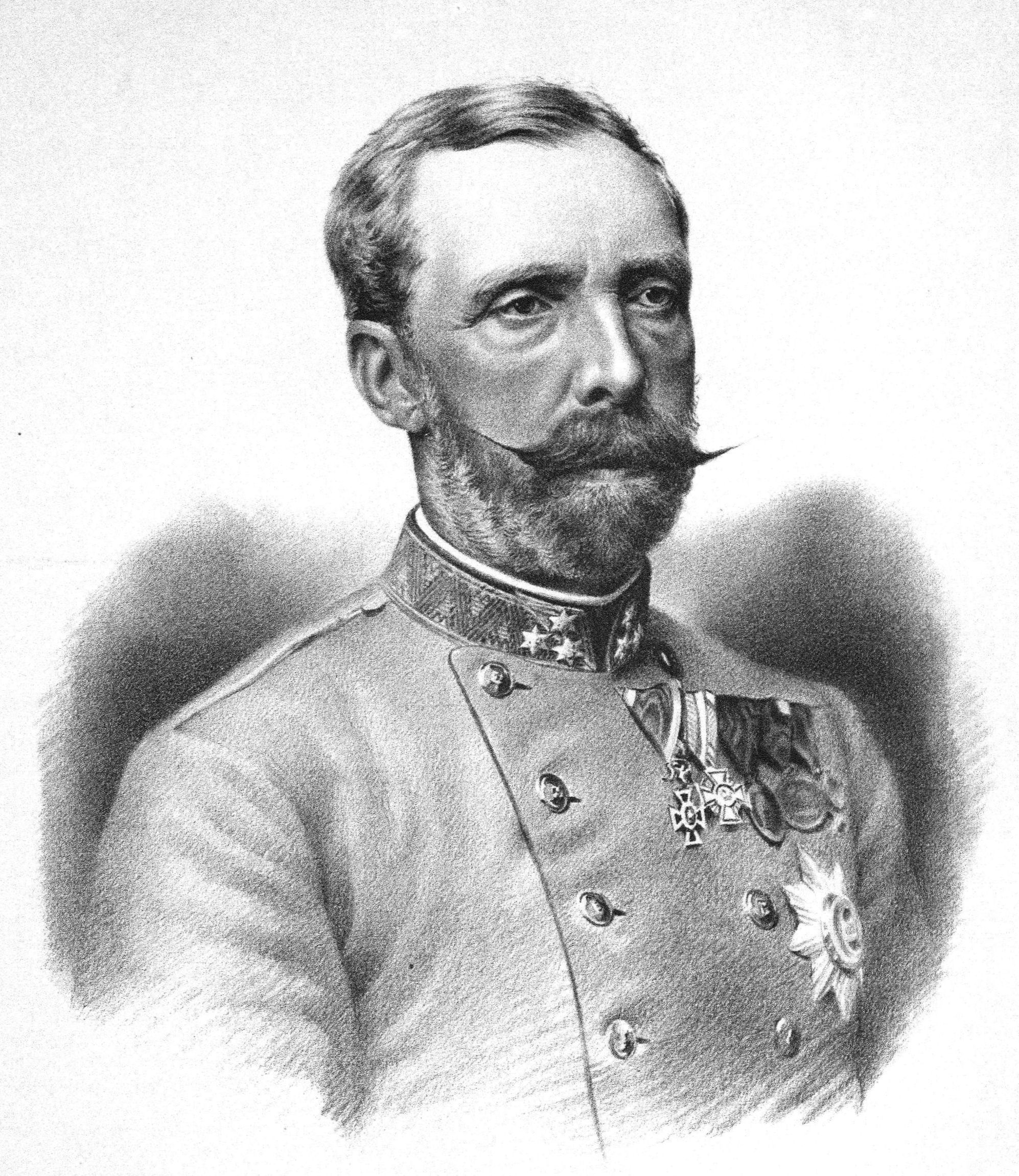
- Anton von Schönfeld c. 1890.
- Born: Anton Maria Emmerich Wilhelm von Schönfeld; 3 July 1827; Prague, Bohemia, Austrian Empire
- Died: 7 January 1898 (aged 70); Vienna, Austria-Hungary
- Education: Theresian Military Academy
- Military career
- Allegiance: Austrian Empire; Austria-Hungary
- Branch: Imperial Austrian Army; Austro-Hungarian Army
- Service years: 1845–1898
- Rank: Feldzeugmeister
- Unit: 82nd Infantry Regiment
- Commands: Imperial and Royal General Staff (1876–1881); Inspector General of the Army (1894–1898)
- Conflicts: Revolutions of 1848; First Italian War of Independence; Second Schleswig War; Austro-Prussian War
- Awards: See decorations section

Anton Maria Emmerich Wilhelm Freiherr von Schönfeld (3 July 1827 – 7 January 1898) was a Czech-Austrian nobleman and Austro-Hungarian military officer. He served as Chief of the Imperial and Royal General Staff and Inspector General of the Army.

== Biography ==
After graduating from the Theresian Military Academy in 1845, he entered the Imperial Austrian Army. He was assigned to the 42nd Infantry Regiment, with which he participated in suppressing unrest in Italy during the Revolutions of 1848. During the First Italian War of Independence, he participated as an Oberleutnant (first lieutenant) in the battles of Mortara and Novara. During the fighting, he was wounded when a bullet damaged his jaw and teeth. For his services during the conflict, he was awarded the Order of the Iron Crown, 3rd Class. He then served in the V Corps in Milan, where he rose to the rank of Hauptmann (captain).

During the Second Italian War of Independence, he served in the 33rd Infantry Regiment, but his unit did not see combat. In 1862, he was promoted to Oberstleutnant (lieutenant colonel), at which time he was assigned to the staff of the VII Corps. That same year, he became head of the Central Chancellery of the Ministry of War in Vienna. During the Second Schleswig War, he was seconded to the Prussian General Staff and subsequently participated in drafting the peace treaty that ended the conflict. During the Austro-Prussian War, he commanded the 63rd Infantry Regiment with the rank of Oberst (colonel). After being promoted to Generalmajor (major general) in 1870, he was entrusted with preparing military exercises for the coming year and amending military regulations. He also participated in the 1874 Brussels draft of the international law of war. From June 1875, with the rank of Feldmarschall-Leutant (lieutenant field marshal), he commanded the 5th Infantry Division in Olomouc.

Following the sudden death of the then Chief of the Imperial and Royal General Staff, Feldzeugmeister (general of the artillery) Franz von John, he succeeded him in this position in 1876. While he was Chief of Staff, Austro-Hungarian forces invaded Bosnia and Herzegovina in 1878. During this time, he was also promoted to the rank of Feldzeugmeister. In June 1881, he resigned from his position due to health reasons. However, he did not retire but was sent to France as head of the military mission in that country. After returning to Vienna, he was appointed military commandant in Trieste. In 1883, he took over as head of the 12th Corps in Sibiu, and six years later, he became commander of the 2nd Corps in Vienna. After the death of Archduke Albrecht in 1894, he became one of inspectors general of the Army. He held this position until his death in 1898. From 1883 he was colonel-in-chief of the 82nd Infantry Regiment.

== Decorations ==
Schönfeld's decorations (both domestic and foreign) include:

- (Habsburg monarchy) Austrian Empire / Austria-Hungary:
  - Order of Leopold
    - Grand Cross
    - Knight with War Decoration
  - Order of the Iron Crown
    - Knight, 1st Class
    - Knight, 2nd Class with War Decoration
    - Knight, 3rd Class
  - Military Merit Cross with War Decoration
  - Military Merit Medal on Red Ribbon
  - Tuscany: Knight of the Order of Military Merit
- Prussia:
  - Grand Cross of the Order of the Red Eagle with Diamonds
  - Royal Order of the Crown, 2nd Class with Swords
  - Duppel Storm Cross
  - Alsen Cross
- Saxony:
  - Grand Cross of the Albert Order
  - Grand Cross of the Saxe-Ernestine House Order
- Hesse:
  - Grand Cross of the Ludwig Order
  - Grand Cross of the Order of Merit of Philip the Magnanimous
- Württemberg: Grand Cross of the Order of the Crown
- France: Grand Officer of the Legion of Honour
- Romania: Grand Cross of the Order of the Star of Romania with Swords
- Serbia: Order of the Cross of Takovo, 1st Class
- Persia: Order of the Lion and the Sun, 2nd Class
- Mecklenburg-Schwerin: Military Merit Cross

== Bibliography ==
- Österreichisches Biographisches Lexikon 1815–1950 (ÖBL). Band 11 (in German), Vienna: Österreichischen Akademie der Wissenschaften, 1999
- Criste, Oskar (1908). Allgemeine Deutsche Biographie 54 (in German). Lipsk: Duncker und Humblot.
- Hof- und Staatshandbuch der Österreichisch-Ungarischen Monarchie für das Jahr 1897 (in German), Vienna: K. K. Hof- und Staatsdruckerei, 1897

Military offices
Preceded by Franz von John	Chief of the Imperial and Royal General Staff; 1876–1881	Succeeded by Friedrich von Beck-Rzikowsky
Preceded by	Inspector General of the Army; 1894–1898	Succeeded by
