= Wilhelm I =

German Emperor from 1871 to 1888

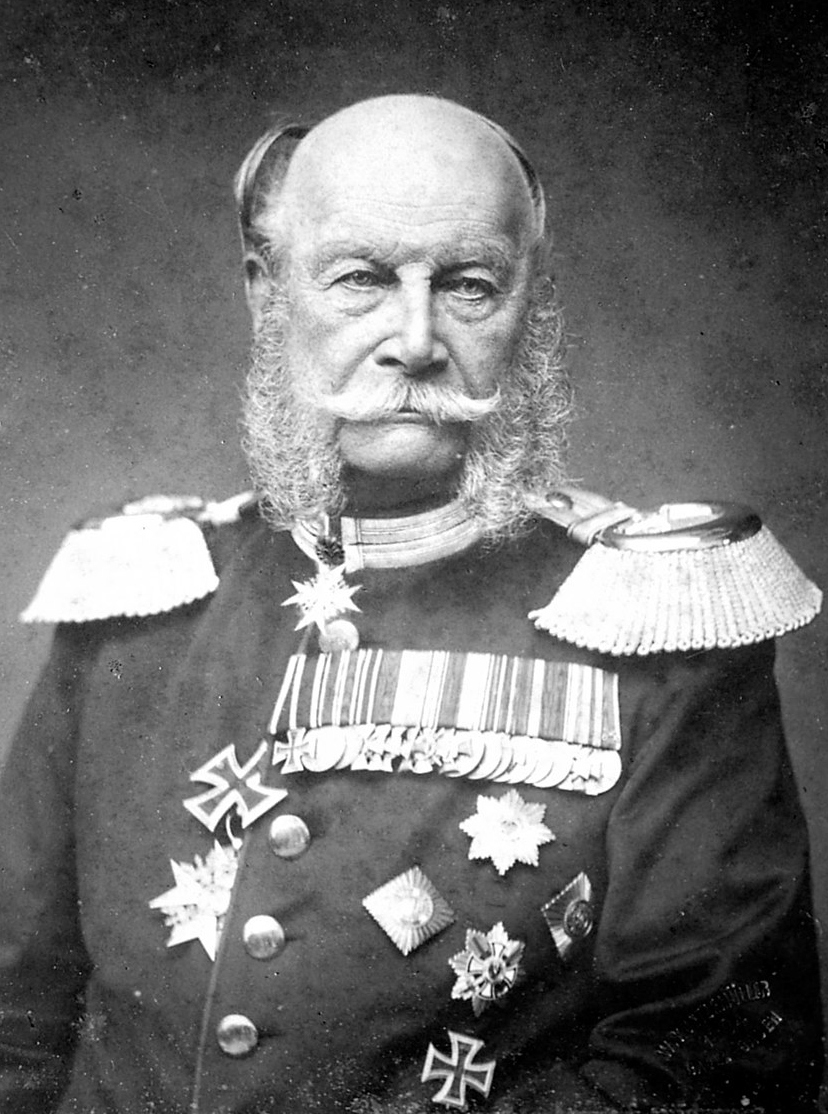
- Wilhelm I in 1884

German Emperor
- Reign: 18 January 1871 – 9 March 1888
- Proclamation: 18 January 1871; Hall of Mirrors, Palace of Versailles
- Predecessor: Monarchy established
- Successor: Frederick III
- Chancellor: Otto von Bismarck

King of Prussia
- Reign: 2 January 1861 – 9 March 1888
- Coronation: 18 October 1861 Schlosskirche, Königsberg
- Predecessor: Frederick William IV
- Successor: Frederick III
- Minister-Presidents: See list: Karl Anton, Prince of Hohenzollern; Prince Adolf zu Hohenlohe-Ingelfingen; Otto von Bismarck; Albrecht von Roon

Holder of the Bundespräsidium of the North German Confederation
- In office 1 July 1867 – 31 December 1870
- Chancellor: Otto von Bismarck
- Born: 22 March 1797; Kronprinzenpalais, Berlin, Prussia
- Died: 9 March 1888 (aged 90); Charlottenburg Palace, Berlin, Germany
- Burial: 16 March 1888; Royal Mausoleum, Charlottenburg Palace Park
- Spouse: Augusta of Saxe-Weimar (m. 1829)
- Issue: Frederick III, German Emperor; Louise, Grand Duchess of Baden
Names
- German: Wilhelm Friedrich Ludwig; English: William Frederick Louis
- House: Hohenzollern
- Father: Frederick William III of Prussia
- Mother: Louise of Mecklenburg-Strelitz
- Military career
- Allegiance: Kingdom of Prussia; German Confederation
- Branch: Prussian Army (active service)
- Service years: 1809–1858 (active service)
- Rank: Generalfeldmarschall (active service)
- Unit: 1st Guards Regiment
- Commands: Stettiner Gardelandwehrbataillon; Fortress Mainz
- Conflicts: War of the Sixth Coalition; Battle of Bar-sur-Aube; Battle of Paris; Hundred Days; Battle of Ligny; Battle of Waterloo; Revolutions of 1848; Austro-Prussian War; Battle of Königgratz; Franco-Prussian War; Battle of Gravelotte; Battle of Sedan; Siege of Paris
- Awards: Iron Cross

Wilhelm I (also known in English as William I; German: Wilhelm Friedrich Ludwig; 22 March 1797 – 9 March 1888) was King of Prussia from 1861 and German Emperor from 1871 until his death in 1888. A member of the House of Hohenzollern, he was the first head of state of a united Germany. He was regent of Prussia from 1858 to 1861 for his elder brother, King Frederick William IV. During the reign of his grandson Wilhelm II, he was known as Emperor Wilhelm the Great (German: Kaiser Wilhelm der Große).

The second son of Prince Frederick William and Louise of Mecklenburg-Strelitz, Wilhelm was not expected to ascend to the throne. His grandfather, King Frederick William II, died the year he was born, and his father was crowned Frederick William III. Wilhelm fought with distinction during the War of the Sixth Coalition, and afterwards became a prominent figure within the Prussian Army. In 1840, his childless elder brother became King of Prussia, making him heir presumptive. Wilhelm played a major role in crushing the Revolutions of 1848 in Germany, although he was briefly forced into exile in England. Frederick William IV suffered a stroke in 1857 and was left incapacitated, and Wilhelm was formally named Prince Regent a year later. In 1861, Wilhelm ascended to the Prussian throne on his elder brother's death.

Upon ascension, Wilhelm immediately came into conflict with the liberal Landtag over his proposed military budget. In response, he appointed Otto von Bismarck to the post of Minister President in order to force through his proposals, beginning a partnership that would last for the rest of his life. On the foreign front, Wilhelm oversaw Prussian victories in the Second Schleswig War and the Austro-Prussian War, establishing Prussia as the leading German power. In 1871, through Bismarck's maneuvers, the unification of Germany was achieved following the Franco-Prussian War. The German Empire was proclaimed and Wilhelm was granted the title of German Emperor. Even though he had considerable power as Kaiser, Wilhelm largely left the affairs of governance to Bismarck. Later in life he was the target of multiple failed assassination attempts, which enabled Bismarck to push through the Anti-Socialist Laws. In 1888, which came to be known as the Year of the Three Emperors, Wilhelm died at the age of 90 after a short illness and was succeeded by his son Frederick. Frederick, already suffering from cancer, died 99 days later and the throne passed to Wilhelm II.

== Early life and military career ==
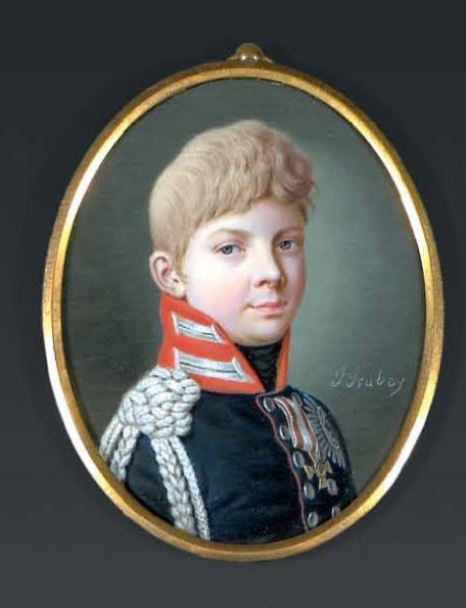
Prince Wilhelm at age 13, c. 1810

The future king and emperor was born Wilhelm Friedrich Louis of Prussia (Wilhelm Friedrich Ludwig von Preußen) in the Kronprinzenpalais in Berlin on 22 March 1797. As the second son of Louise of Mecklenburg-Strelitz and Prince Frederick William, himself son of King Frederick William II, Wilhelm was not expected to ascend to the throne. His grandfather died the year he was born, at age 53, in 1797, and his father Frederick William III became king. He was educated from 1801 to 1809 by Johann Friedrich Gottlieb Delbrück, who was also in charge of the education of Wilhelm's brother, the Crown Prince Frederick William. At age twelve, his father appointed him an officer in the Prussian army.

Wilhelm served in the army from 1814 onward. Like his father, he fought against Napoleon I of France during the part of the Napoleonic Wars known in Germany as the Befreiungskriege ("Wars of Liberation", otherwise known as the War of the Sixth Coalition), and was reportedly a very brave soldier. He was made a captain (Hauptmann) and earned the Iron Cross for his actions at Bar-sur-Aube, although the Prussian Army did not participate in this battle. The war and the fight against France left a lifelong impression on him, and he had a long-standing antipathy towards the French.

In 1815, Wilhelm was promoted to major and commanded a battalion of the 1. Garderegiment. He fought under Gebhard Leberecht von Blücher at the Battles of Ligny and Waterloo. In 1817, he accompanied his sister Charlotte to Saint Petersburg, when she married Emperor Nicholas I of Russia, becoming Empress Alexandra Feodorovna.

In 1816, Wilhelm became the commander of the Stettiner Gardelandwehrbataillon and in 1818 was promoted to Generalmajor. The next year, Wilhelm was appointed inspector of the VII. and VIII. Army Corps. This made him a spokesman of the Prussian Army within the House of Hohenzollern. He argued in favour of a strong, well-trained, and well-equipped army. In 1820, Wilhelm became commander of the 1. Gardedivision and in 1825 was promoted to commanding general of the III. Army Corps.

Around this time, Wilhelm became romantically linked with his cousin, Polish noblewoman Princess Elisa Radziwill. In 1826, Wilhelm was forced to break off the relationship by his father, who deemed it an inappropriate match. It is alleged that Elisa had an illegitimate daughter by Wilhelm who was brought up by Joseph and Caroline Kroll, owners of the Kroll Opera House in Berlin, and was given the name Agnes Kroll. She married a Carl Friedrich Ludwig Dettman (known as "Louis") and emigrated to Sydney, in 1849. They had a family of three sons and two daughters. Agnes died in 1904.

In 1829, Wilhelm married Princess Augusta of Saxe-Weimar-Eisenach, the daughter of Grand Duke Karl Friedrich of Saxe-Weimar-Eisenach and Maria Pavlovna, the sister of Nicholas I. Their marriage was outwardly stable, but not a very happy one. In 1834-37 he had the Old Palace in Berlin built as a new family home, in which he continued to live later as king and emperor, while he only used the Berlin Palace for representative purposes.

On 7 June 1840 his older brother became King of Prussia. Since he had no children, Wilhelm was first in line to succeed him to the throne and thus was given the title Prinz von Preußen. Against his convictions but out of loyalty towards his brother, Wilhelm signed the bill setting up a Prussian parliament in 1847 and took a seat in the upper chamber, the Prussian House of Lords.

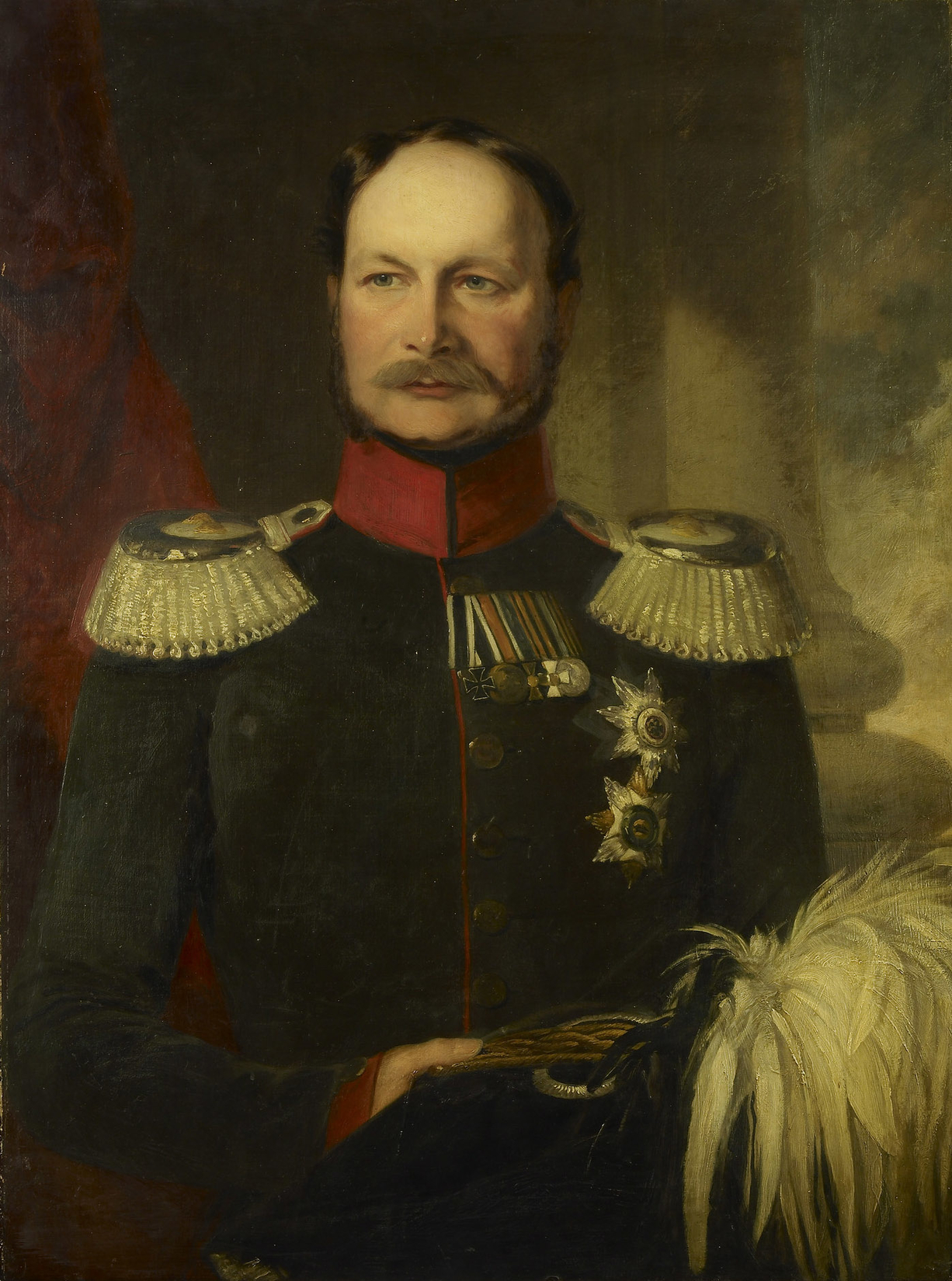
Portrait of Prince Wilhelm, by Frederick Richard Say, c. 1848

During the Revolutions of 1848, Wilhelm successfully crushed a revolt in Berlin that was aimed at Frederick William IV. The use of cannons made him unpopular at the time and earned him the nickname Kartätschenprinz (Prince of Grapeshot). Indeed, he had to flee to England for a while, disguised as a merchant. He returned and helped to put down an uprising in Baden, where he commanded the Prussian army. In October 1849, he became governor-general of the Rhine Province and Province of Westphalia, with a seat at the Electoral Palace, Koblenz.

During their time at Koblenz, Wilhelm and his wife entertained liberal scholars such as the historian Maximilian Wolfgang Duncker, August von Bethmann-Hollweg and Clemens Theodor Perthes. Wilhelm's opposition to liberal ideas gradually softened.

In 1854, the prince was raised to the rank of a field-marshal and made governor of the federal Fortress of Mainz. In 1857 Frederick William IV suffered a stroke and became mentally disabled for the rest of his life. In January 1858, Wilhelm became Prince Regent for his brother, initially only temporarily but after October on a permanent basis. Against the advice of his brother, Wilhelm swore an oath of office on the Prussian constitution and promised to preserve it "solid and inviolable". Wilhelm appointed a liberal, Karl Anton von Hohenzollern-Sigmaringen, as Minister President and thus initiated what became known as the "New Era" in Prussia, although there were conflicts between Wilhelm and the liberal majority in the Landtag on matters of reforming the armed forces.

== Life as King ==
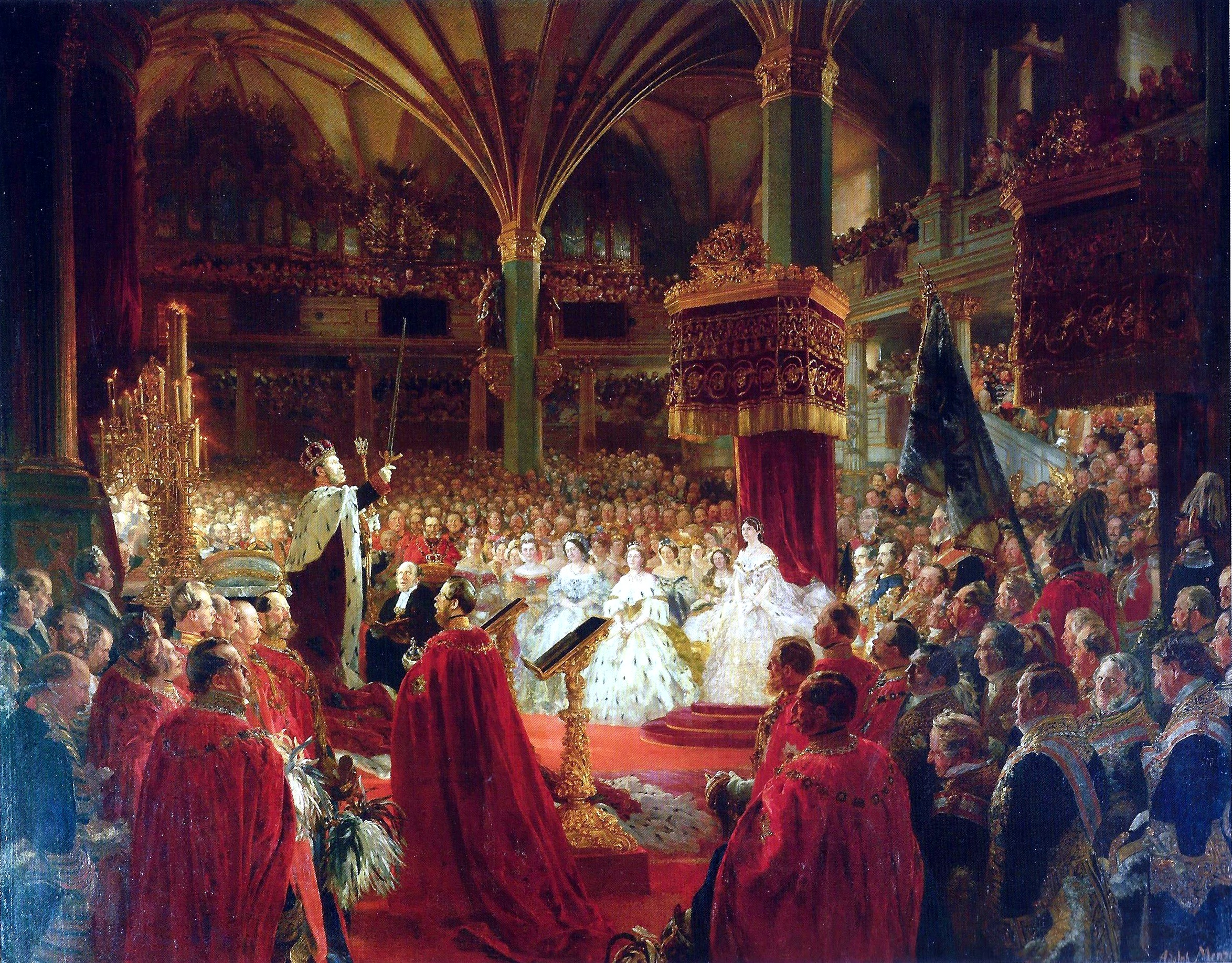
Coronation of William I as King of Prussia at Königsberg Castle, 18 October 1861.

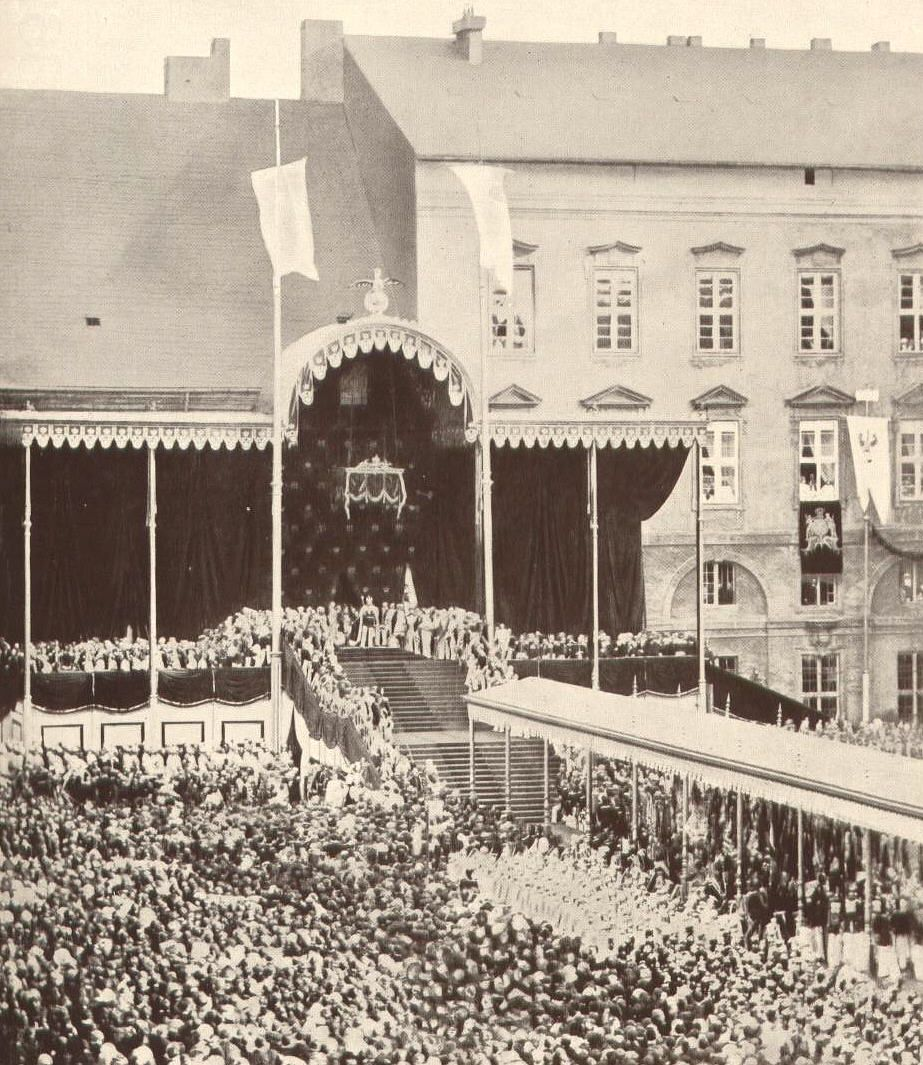
rare photographic testimony of the Coronation

On 2 January 1861, Frederick William IV died and Wilhelm ascended the throne as Wilhelm I of Prussia. In July, a student from Leipzig attempted to assassinate Wilhelm, but he was only lightly injured. Like Frederick I of Prussia, Wilhelm travelled to Königsberg and there crowned himself at the Schlosskirche. Wilhelm chose the anniversary of the Battle of Leipzig, 18 October, for this event, which was the first Prussian coronation ceremony since 1701 and the only coronation of a German king after 1806. Wilhelm refused to comply with his brother's wish, expressed in Frederick William's last will, that he should abrogate the constitution.

Wilhelm inherited a conflict between Frederick William and the liberal Landtag. He was considered to be politically neutral as he intervened less in politics than his brother. In 1862 the Landtag refused an increase in the military budget needed to pay for the already implemented reform of the army. This involved expanding the peacetime army from 150,000 to 200,000 men and the annual number of new recruits from 40,000 to 63,000. However, the truly controversial part was keeping the length of military service (raised in 1856 from two years) at three years. When his request (backed by his Minister of War Albrecht von Roon) was refused, Wilhelm first considered abdicating, but his son, the Crown Prince, advised strongly against it. Then, on the advice of Roon, Wilhelm appointed Otto von Bismarck as Minister President in order to force through the proposals. Under the Prussian constitution, the Minister President was responsible solely to the king, not to the Landtag. Bismarck, a conservative Prussian Junker and loyal friend of the king, liked to see his working relationship with Wilhelm as that of a vassal to his feudal superior. Nonetheless, it was Bismarck who effectively directed affairs, domestic as well as foreign; on several occasions he gained Wilhelm's assent by threatening to resign.

During his reign, Wilhelm was the commander-in-chief of the Prussian forces in the Second Schleswig War against Denmark in 1864 and the Austro-Prussian War in 1866. During the latter war, his army defeated the Austrians at Königgratz. After the latter was won by Prussia, Wilhelm wanted to march on to Vienna and annex Austria, but was dissuaded from doing so by Bismarck and his son Crown Prince Frederick. Bismarck wanted to end the war quickly, so as to allow Prussia to ally with Austria if it needed to at a later date; Frederick was also appalled by the casualties and wanted a speedy end to hostilities. During a heated discussion, Bismarck threatened to resign if Wilhelm continued to Vienna; Bismarck got his way. Wilhelm had to content himself with becoming the de facto ruler of the northern two-thirds of Germany. Prussia annexed several of Austria's allies north of the Main, as well as Schleswig-Holstein. Saxe-Lauenburg was already in a personal union with Prussia since 1865.

In 1867, the North German Confederation was created as a federation (federally organised state) of the North German and Central German states under the permanent presidency of Prussia. Wilhelm assumed the Bundespräsidium, the presidium of the Confederation; the post was a hereditary office of the Prussian crown. Not expressis verbis, but in function he was the head of state. Bismarck intentionally avoided a title such as Präsident as it sounded too republican. Wilhelm became also the constitutional Bundesfeldherr, the commander of all federal armed forces. Via secret treaties with the South German states, he also became commander of their armies in times of war. In 1870, during the Franco-Prussian War, Wilhelm was in command of all the German forces at the crucial Battle of Sedan, as well as at the Battle of Gravelotte.

== German Emperor ==
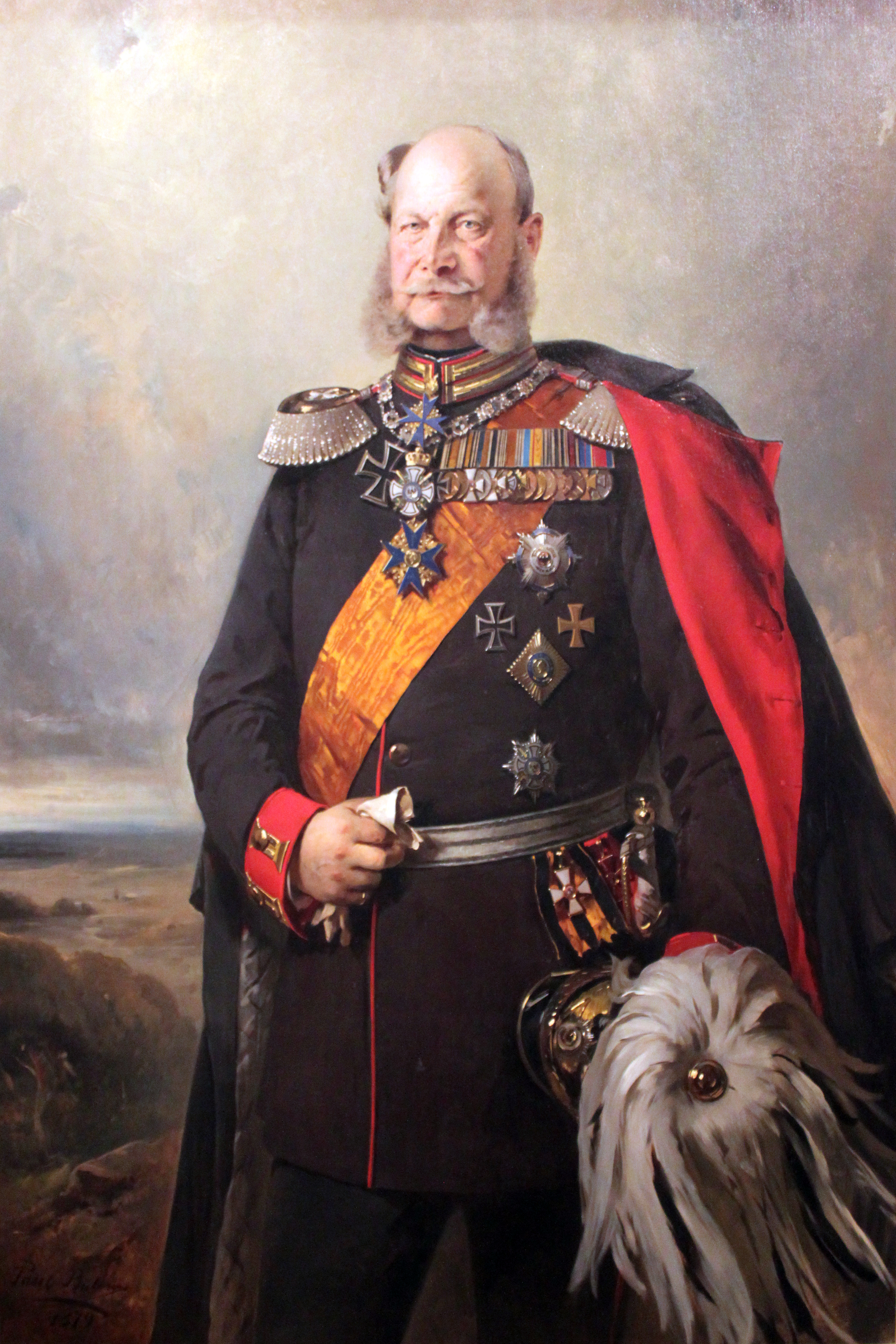
Wilhelm in a uniform, in a painting by Paul Bülow

During the Franco-Prussian War, the South German states joined the North German Confederation, which was reorganized as the German Empire (Deutsches Reich). The title of Bundespräsidium was replaced with the title of German Emperor (Deutscher Kaiser). This was decided on by the legislative organs, the Reichstag and Bundesrat, and Wilhelm agreed to this on 8 December in the presence of a Reichstag delegation. The new constitution and the title of Emperor came into effect on 1 January 1871.

Wilhelm, however, hesitated to accept the constitutional title, as he feared that it would overshadow his own title as King of Prussia. He also wanted it to be Kaiser von Deutschland ("Emperor of Germany"), but Bismarck warned him that the South German princes and the Emperor of Austria might protest. Wilhelm eventually—though grudgingly—relented and on 18 January, he was formally proclaimed as emperor in the Hall of Mirrors in the Palace of Versailles. The date was chosen as the coronation date of the first Prussian king in 1701. In the national memory, 18 January became the day of the foundation of the Empire (Reichsgründungstag), although it did not have a constitutional significance.

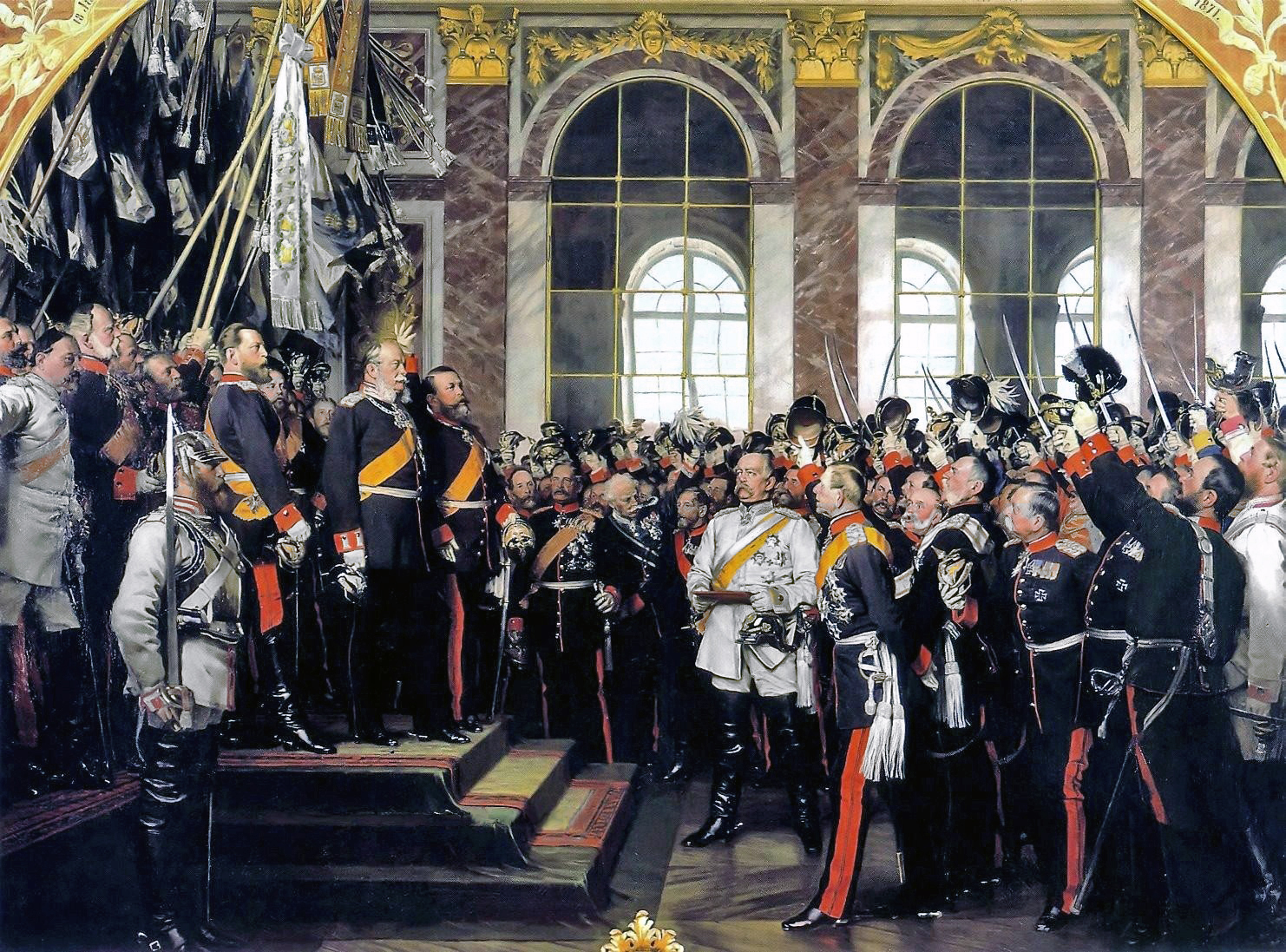
Wilhelm is proclaimed German Emperor in the Hall of Mirrors in Versailles, France flanked by his only son, Frederick and son in law – Frederick I, Grand Duke of Baden. Painting by Anton von Werner

To many intellectuals, the coronation of Wilhelm was associated with the restoration of the Holy Roman Empire. Felix Dahn wrote a poem, "Macte senex Imperator" ('Hail thee, old emperor') in which he nicknamed Wilhelm Barbablanca (whitebeard), a play on the name of the medieval emperor Frederick Barbarossa (redbeard). According to the King asleep in mountain legend, Barbarossa slept under the Kyffhäuser mountain until Germany had need of him. Wilhelm I was thus portrayed as a second coming of Barbarossa. The Kyffhäuser Monument portrays both emperors.

In 1872, he arbitrated a boundary dispute between the United Kingdom and the United States, deciding in favor of the U.S. and placing the San Juan Islands of modern-day Washington within U.S. national territory, thus ending the 12-year bloodless Pig War.

In his memoirs, Bismarck describes Wilhelm as an old-fashioned, courteous, infallibly polite gentleman and a genuine Prussian officer, whose good common sense was occasionally undermined by "female influences". This was a reference to Wilhelm's wife, who had been educated by, among others Johann Wolfgang von Goethe and was intellectually superior to her husband. She was also at times very outspoken in her opposition to official policies as she was a liberal. Wilhelm, however, had long been strongly opposed to liberal ideas. Despite possessing considerable power as Kaiser, Wilhelm left the task of governing mostly to his chancellor, limiting himself to representing the state and approving Bismarck's every policy. In private he once remarked on his relationship with Bismarck: It is difficult to be emperor under such a chancellor.

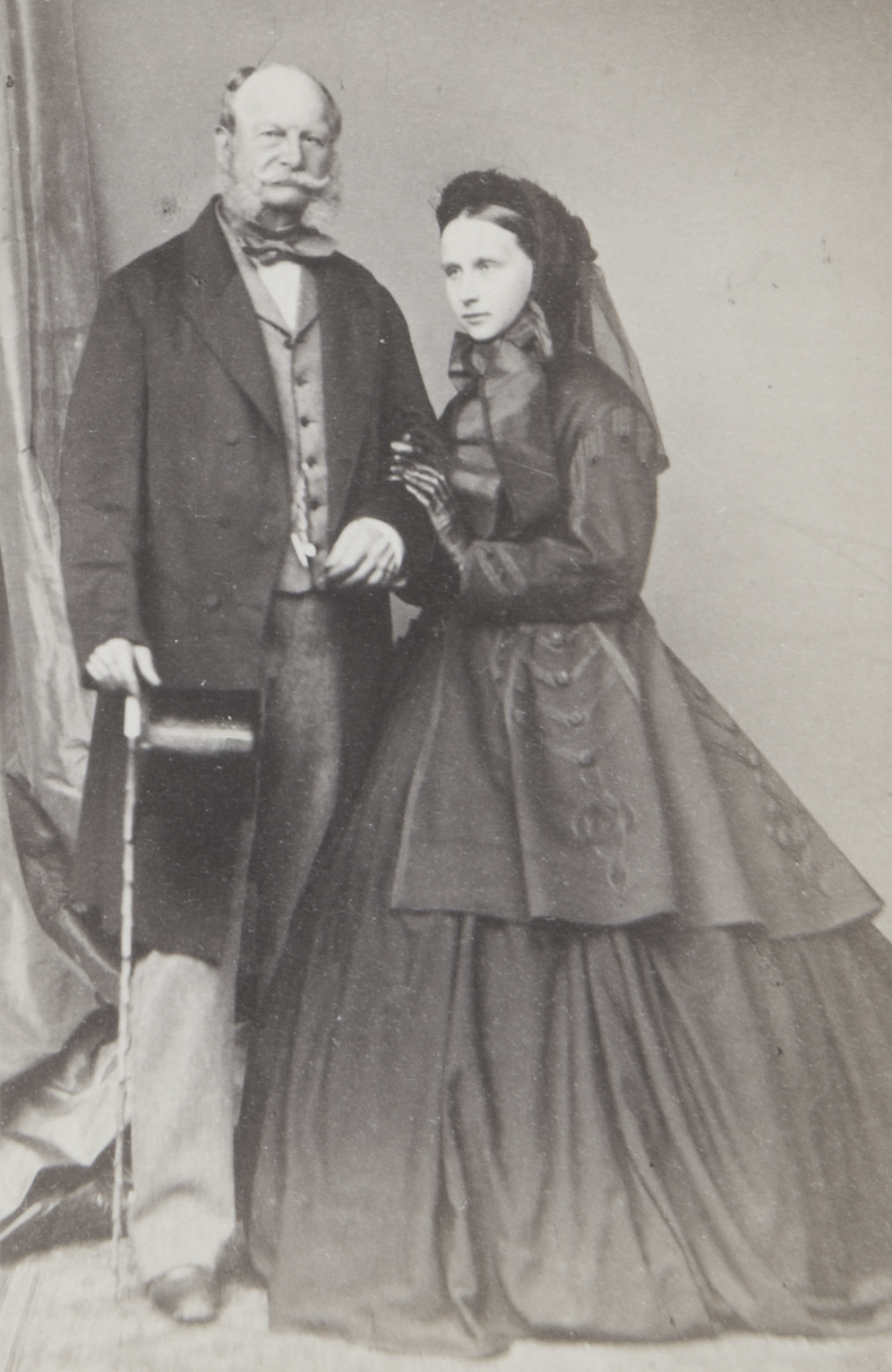
Wilhem I with his only daughter, Princess Louise, c. 1860s

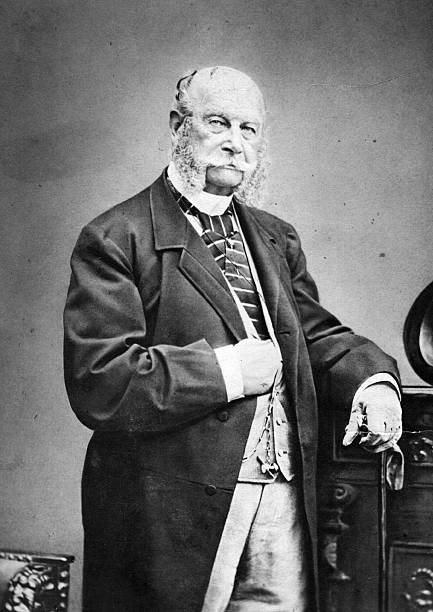
Portrait of Wilhelm I, c. 1870

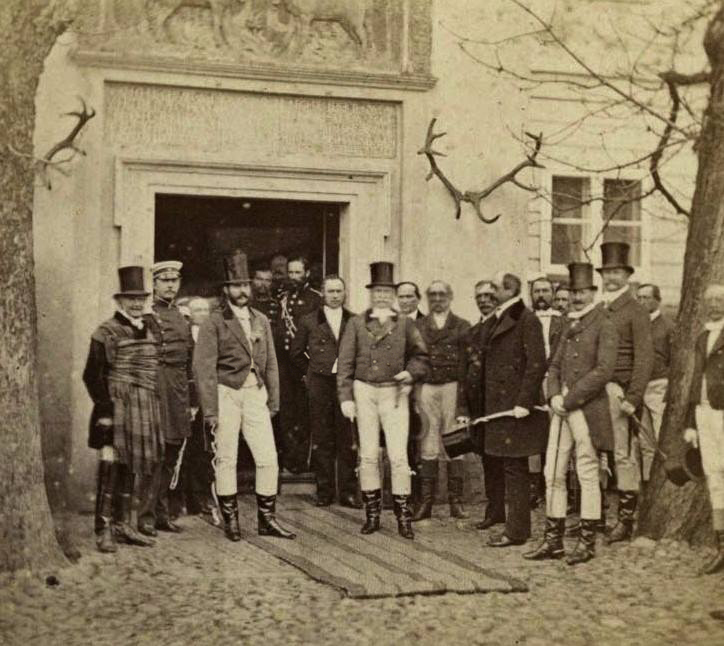
Wilhelm I with his nephew, Tsar Alexander II on a hunting trip together, c. 1872

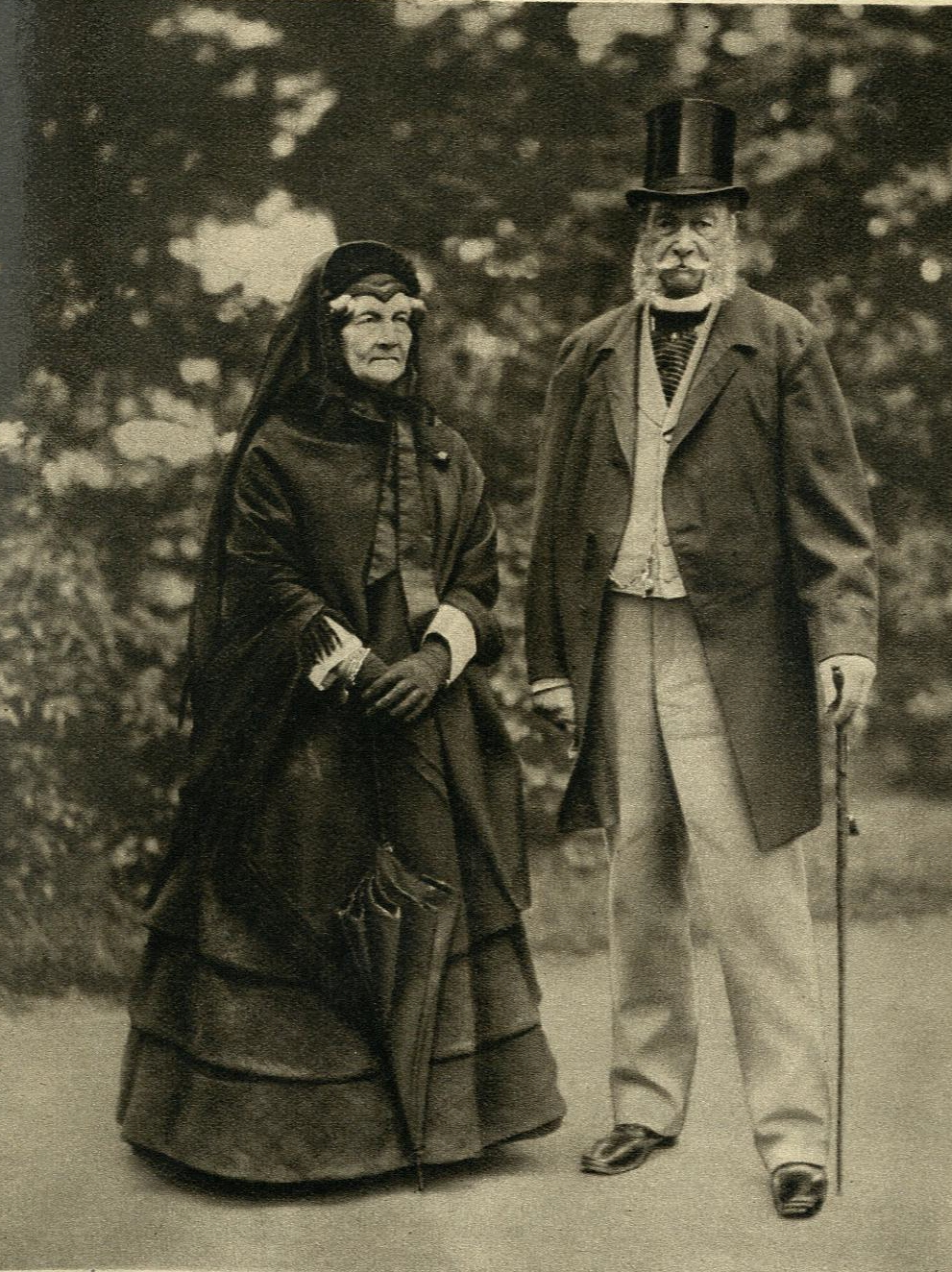
Wilhelm I with his sister, Princess Alexandrine, c. 1882

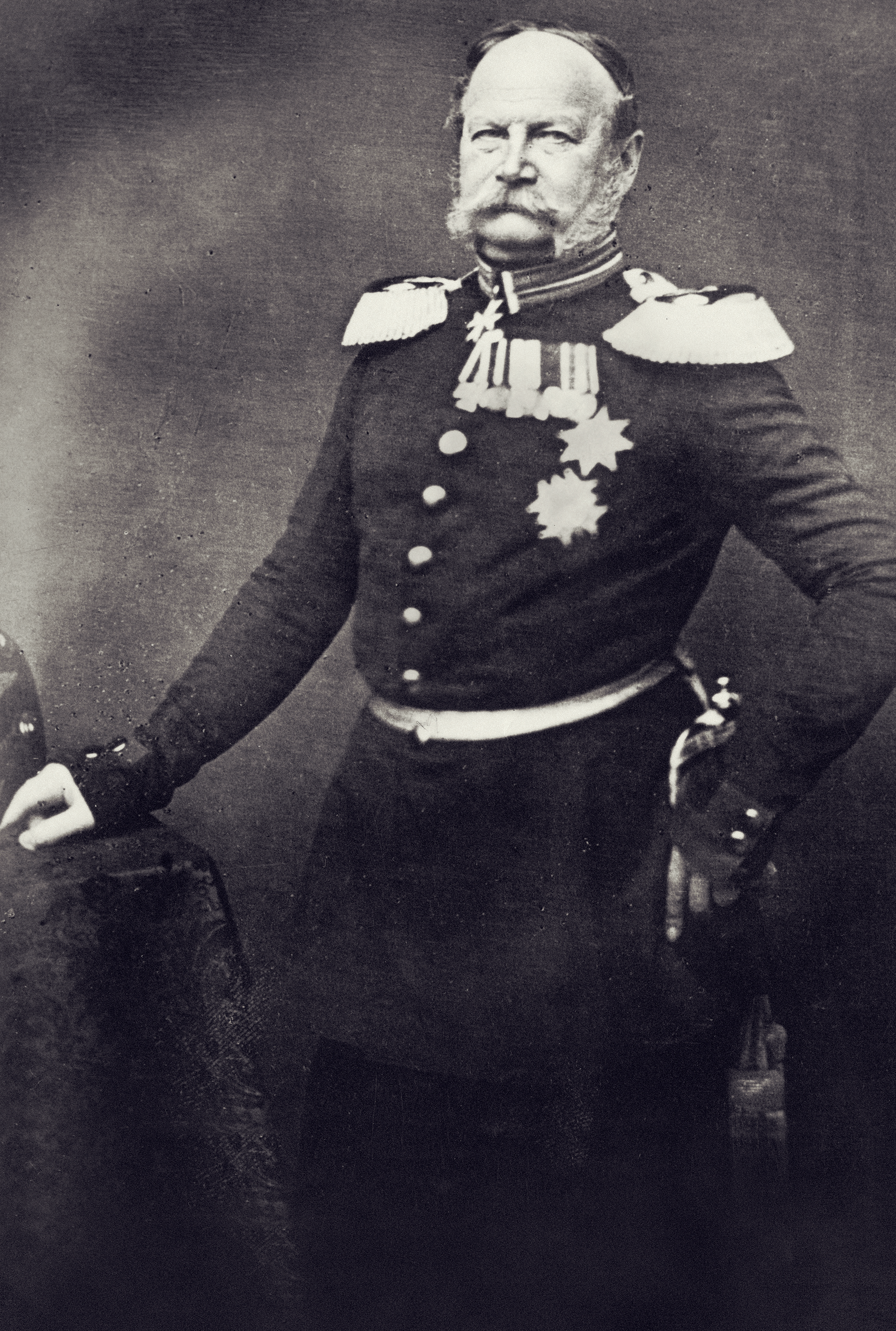
Prince Wilhelm (future Wilhelm I), c. 1858

=== Assassination attempts and Anti-Socialist Laws ===
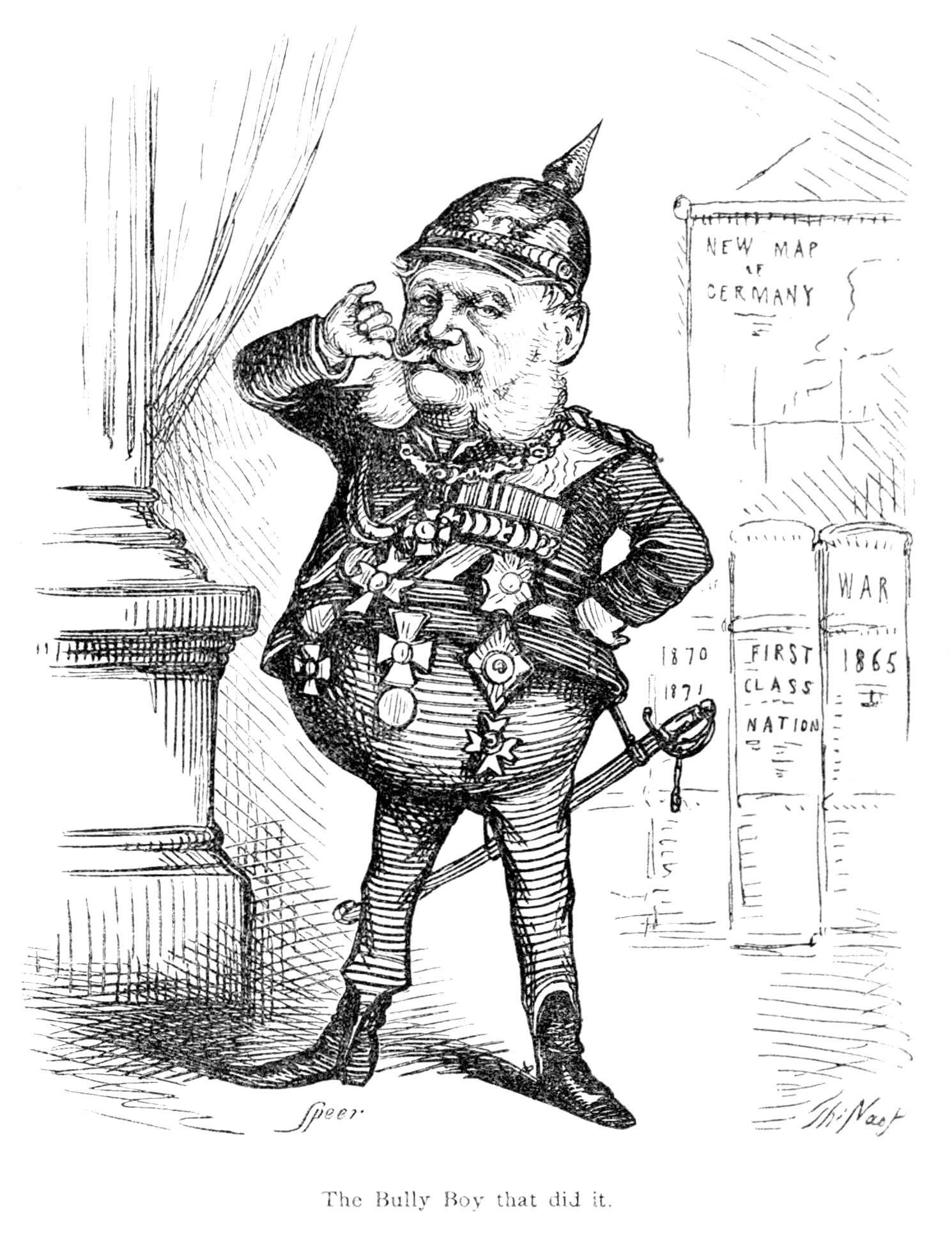
Caricature of Wilhelm I by Thomas Nast which appeared in The Fight at Dame Europa's School by Henry William Pullen

On 11 May 1878, an anarchist plumber named Max Hödel failed in an assassination attempt on Wilhelm in Berlin. Hödel used a revolver to shoot at the then 81-year-old Emperor, while he and his daughter, Princess Louise, paraded in their carriage on Unter den Linden. When the bullet missed, Hödel ran across the street and fired another round which also missed. In the commotion one of the individuals who tried to apprehend Hödel suffered severe internal injuries and died two days later. Hödel was seized immediately. He was tried, convicted, sentenced to death, and executed on 16 August 1878.

A second attempt to assassinate Wilhelm I was made on 2 June 1878 by Karl Nobiling, another anarchist. As the Emperor drove past in an open carriage, the assassin fired two shots from a shotgun at him from the window of a house off the Unter den Linden. Wilhelm was severely wounded and was rushed back to the palace. Nobiling then shot himself in a suicide attempt. While Wilhelm survived this attack, the assassin died from his self-inflicted wound three months later.

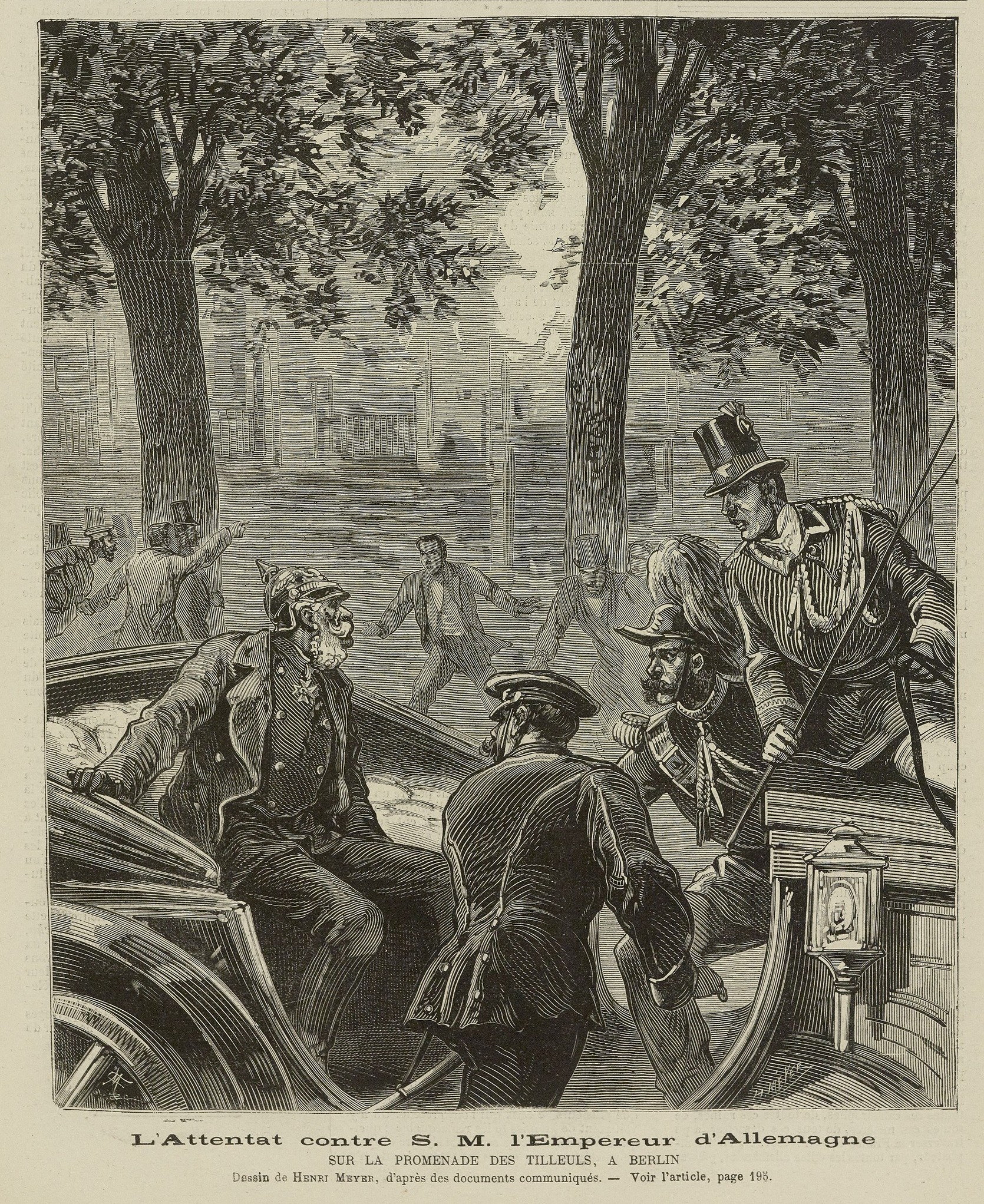
Nobiling assassination attempt as the front cover of Le Journal illustré (16 June 1878)

The attempts on Wilhelm's life became the pretext for the institution of the Anti-Socialist Laws, which were passed by Bismarck's government with the support of a majority in the Reichstag on 19 October 1878 for the purpose of fighting the socialist and working-class movement. The laws prohibited societies, meetings and publications that "aim[ed] at the overthrow of the existing political or social order through social-democratic, socialist or communist endeavours". The laws were extended every 2–3 years. Despite the laws and their penalties, the Social Democratic Party increased its influence among the masses. Under the pressure of the mass working-class movement, the laws were allowed to expire on 30 September 1890.

=== Later years and death ===
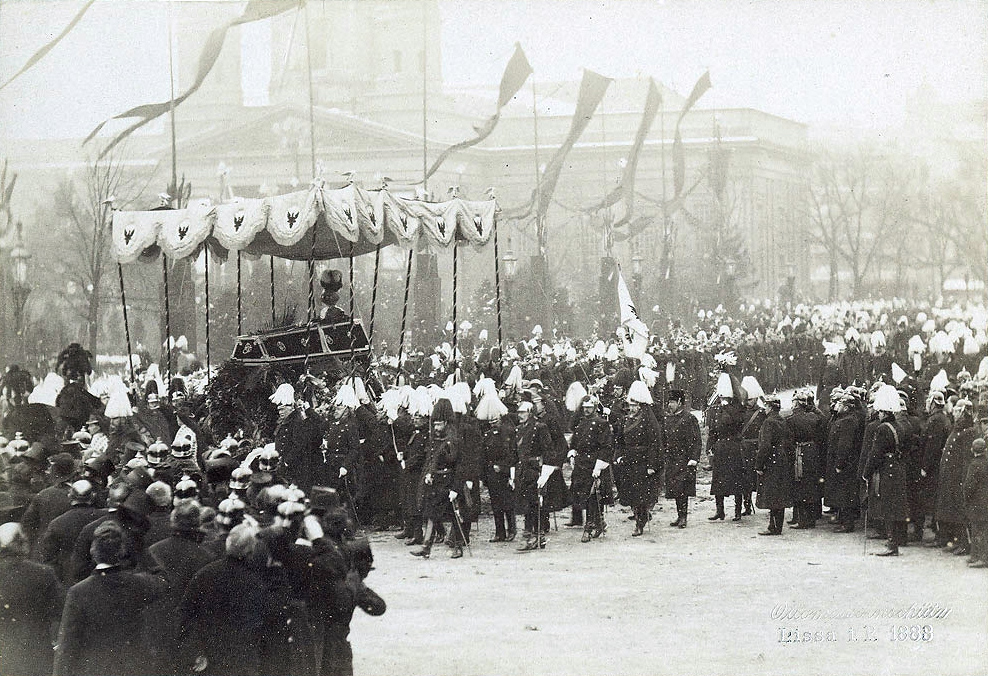
Wilhelm's funeral procession in the Lustgarten, in the background the former Berlin Cathedral, 1888

In August 1878, Alexander II of Russia, Wilhelm's nephew, wrote a letter (known as Ohrfeigenbrief) to him complaining about the treatment Russian interests had received at the Congress of Berlin. In response Wilhelm, his wife Augusta, and his son travelled to Russia (against the advice of Bismarck) to mend fences in face-to-face talks. However, by once again threatening to resign, Bismarck overcame the opposition of Wilhelm to a closer alliance with Austria-Hungary. In October, Wilhelm agreed to the Dual Alliance (Zweibund) between Germany and Austria-Hungary, which was directed against Russia.

Another assassination attempt failed on 28 September 1883 when Wilhelm unveiled the Niederwalddenkmal in Rüdesheim. A group of anarchists had prepared an attack using dynamite which failed due to the wet weather.

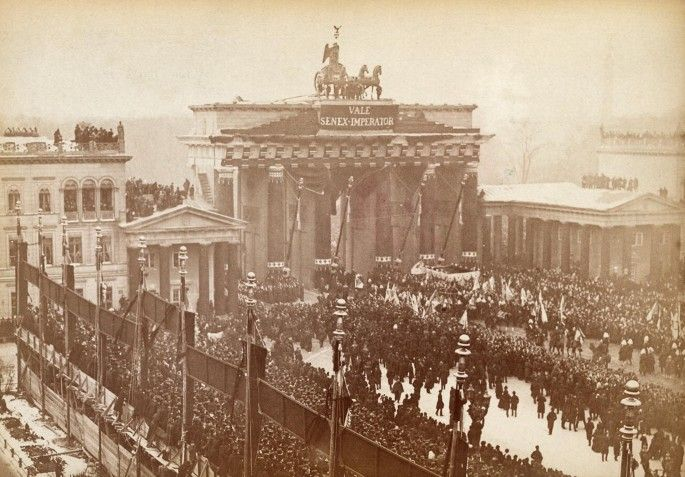
passage of the funeral procession under the Brandenburg Gate

The Berlin Conference of 1884–1885 organized by Otto von Bismarck can be seen as the formalization of the Scramble for Africa. Claiming much of the left-over territories in Africa and Oceania that were yet unclaimed, Germany managed to build the large German colonial empire.

Despite the assassination attempts and Wilhelm's unpopular role in the 1848 uprising, he and his wife were very popular, especially in their later years. Many people considered them the personification of "the old Prussia" and liked their austere and simple lifestyle. Wilhelm died on 9 March 1888 in Berlin after a short illness, at age 90. He was buried on 16 March at the Royal Mausoleum at Park Charlottenburg, beside his mother Queen Luise. He was succeeded by his son Frederick III, who was already fatally unwell himself (suffering from throat cancer). Frederick III spent the 99 days of his reign fighting his illness before dying and being succeeded by his eldest son Wilhelm on 15 June.

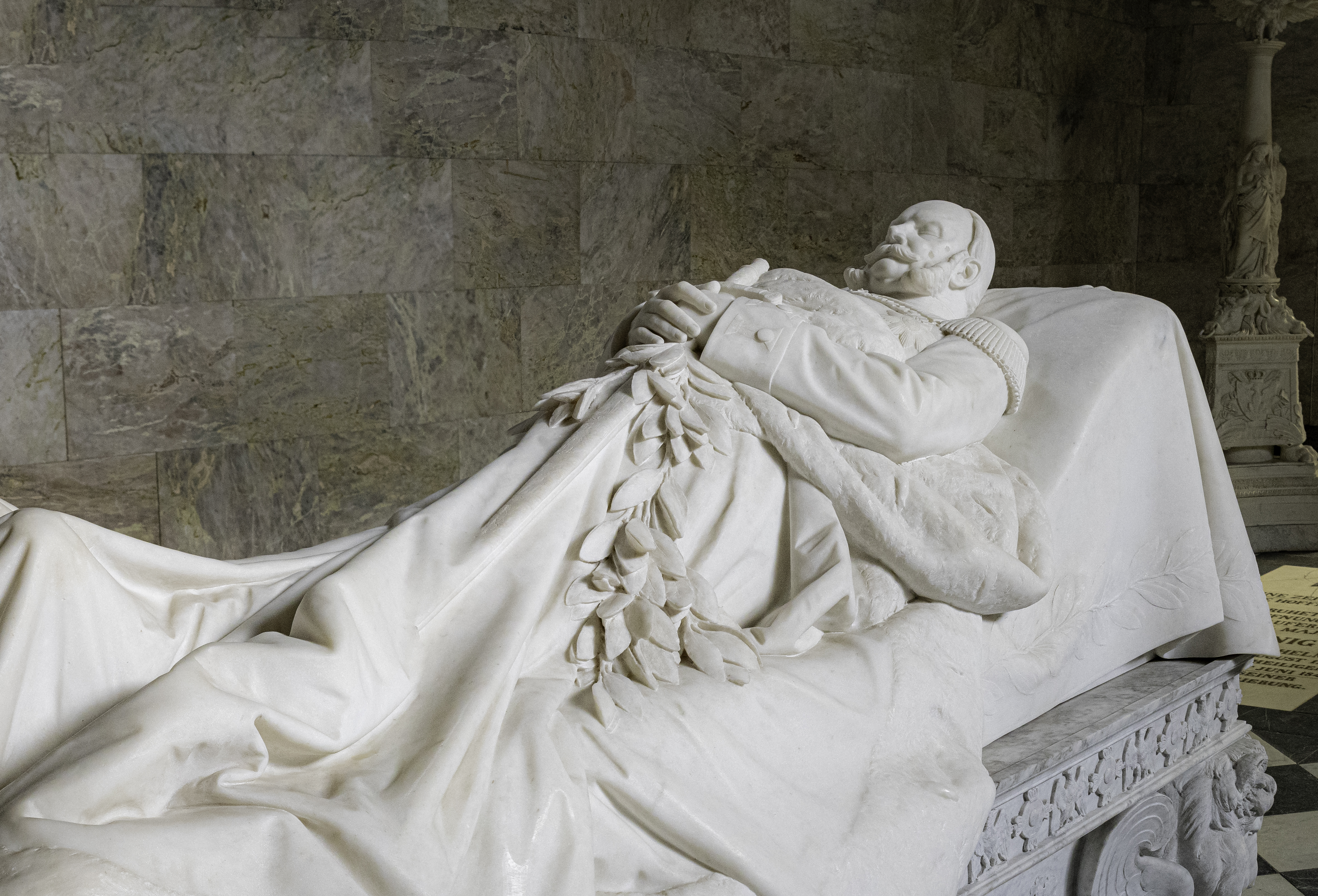
Grave of Wilhelm I in the mausoleum of Schloss Charlottenburg in Berlin

To honour him a large number of memorials/statues were erected all over the country over the following years. The best known among them are the Kyffhäuser monument (1890–96) in Thuringia, the monument at Porta Westfalica (1896) and the mounted statue of Wilhelm at the Deutsches Eck in Koblenz (1897). The National Kaiser Wilhelm Monument in front of the Berlin Palace was destroyed during German Democratic Republic by the government of East Berlin in 1950.

== Issue ==
Wilhelm and Augusta of Saxe-Weimar had two children:

Image	Name	Birth	Death	Notes
	Frederick III, German Emperor and King of Prussia	18 October 1831	15 June 1888 (aged 56)	married (25 January 1858) Victoria, Princess Royal (1840–1901); eight children.
	Princess Louise of Prussia	3 December 1838	23 April 1923 (aged 84)	married (20 September 1856) Prince Frederick of Baden (1826–1907); three children.

== Titles, styles, honours and arms ==
Monogram of Wilhelm I

His full title as king of Prussia was Wilhelm, by the Grace of God, King of Prussia; Margrave of Brandenburg, Burgrave of Nuremberg, Count of Hohenzollern; Sovereign and Supreme Duke of Silesia and of the County of Glatz; Grand Duke of the Lower Rhine and of Posen; Duke of Saxony, of Westphalia, of Angria, of Pomerania, Lüneburg, Holstein and Schleswig, of Magdeburg, of Bremen, of Guelders, Cleves, Jülich and Berg, Duke of the Wends and the Kassubes, of Crossen, Lauenburg and Mecklenburg; Landgrave of Hesse and Thuringia; Margrave of Upper and Lower Lusatia; Prince of Orange; Prince of Rügen, of East Friesland, of Paderborn and Pyrmont, of Halberstadt, Münster, Minden, Osnabrück, Hildesheim, of Verden, Cammin, Fulda, Nassau and Moers; Princely Count of Henneberg; Count of Mark, of Ravensberg, of Hohenstein, Tecklenburg and Lingen, of Mansfeld, Sigmaringen and Veringen; Lord of Frankfurt.

=== Honours and awards ===
10 goldmark depicting Wilhelm and his titles

==== German decorations ====
- Prussia:
  - Knight of the Black Eagle, 1 January 1807; with Collar, 1815
  - Grand Cross of the Red Eagle, with Swords
  - Pour le Mérite (military), 27 July 1849; with Oak Leaves, 4 August 1866; Grand Cross, 11 November 1866
  - Grand Commander's Cross of the Royal House Order of Hohenzollern
  - Iron Cross, 2nd Class, 1813; 1st Class, 1870; Grand Cross, 16 June 1871
  - Founder of the Royal Order of the Crown, 18 October 1861
  - Founder of the Military Merit Cross, 27 February 1864
  - Founder of the Duppel Storm Cross, 18 October 1864
  - Founder of the Cross of Merit for Women and Girls, 22 March 1871
- Ascanian duchies: Grand Cross of the Order of Albert the Bear, 31 May 1841
- Baden:
  - Grand Cross of the House Order of Fidelity, 1836
  - Grand Cross of the Zähringer Lion, 1836
  - Grand Cross of the Military Karl-Friedrich Merit Order, 1849
- Bavaria:
  - Knight of St. Hubert, 1842
  - Grand Cross of the Military Order of Max Joseph, 21 November 1853
- Brunswick: Grand Cross of the Order of Henry the Lion
- Ernestine duchies: Grand Cross of the Saxe-Ernestine House Order, May 1846
- Hanover:
  - Grand Cross of the Royal Guelphic Order, 1826
  - Knight of St. George, 1840
- Hesse-Darmstadt:
  - Grand Cross of the Ludwig Order, 27 June 1838
  - Grand Cross of the Merit Order of Philip the Magnanimous, with Swords, 4 November 1849
  - Military Merit Cross, 15 March 1871
- Hesse-Kassel: Knight of the Golden Lion, 5 September 1841
- Hohenzollern: Cross of Honour of the Princely House Order of Hohenzollern, 1st Class
- Mecklenburg-Schwerin: Military Merit Cross, 1st Class
- Nassau: Knight of the Gold Lion of Nassau, May 1858
- Oldenburg: Grand Cross of the Order of Duke Peter Friedrich Ludwig, with Golden Crown, 16 May 1850; with Swords, 31 December 1870
- Saxe-Weimar-Eisenach: Grand Cross of the White Falcon, 24 December 1828; with Swords, 1870
- Saxony:
  - Knight of the Rue Crown, 1840
  - Grand Cross of the Military Order of St. Henry, 1870
- Württemberg:
  - Grand Cross of the Württemberg Crown, 1836
  - Grand Cross of the Military Merit Order, 12 September 1870

==== Foreign decorations ====
- Austria:
  - Grand Cross of the Royal Hungarian Order of St. Stephen, 1835
  - Grand Cross of the Military Order of Maria Theresa
- Belgium: Grand Cordon of the Order of Leopold, 27 April 1851
- Brazil:
  - Grand Cross of the Southern Cross
  - Grand Cross of the Order of Pedro I
- Denmark: Knight of the Elephant, 27 February 1841
- France: Grand Cross of the Legion of Honour, 14 May 1857
- Greece: Grand Cross of the Redeemer
- Hawaii: Grand Cross of the Order of Kamehameha I, 1876
- Japan: Grand Cordon of the Order of the Chrysanthemum, 8 April 1879
- Mexico: Grand Cross of the Mexican Eagle, with Collar, 1865
- Netherlands:
  - Grand Cross of the Military William Order
  - Grand Cross of the Netherlands Lion
- Portugal:
  - Grand Cross of the Tower and Sword
  - Grand Cross of the Sash of the Three Orders
- Russia:
  - Knight of St. George, 4th Class, 3 August 1814; 1st Class, 26 November 1869
  - Knight of St. Andrew, 20 June 1817
  - Knight of St. Alexander Nevsky, 20 June 1817
  - Knight of St. Anna, 1st Class, 20 June 1817
  - Knight of St. Vladimir, 1st Class, 30 August 1834
- Poland: Knight of the White Eagle, 1829
- Sardinia:
  - Knight of the Annunciation, 3 September 1850
  - Gold Medal of Military Valor, 1866
- Serbia: Grand Cross of the Cross of Takovo
- Siam: Knight of the Order of the Royal House of Chakri, 1 September 1887
- Spain:
  - Knight of the Golden Fleece, 22 March 1853
  - Grand Cross of the Military Order of St. Ferdinand
- Sweden:
  - Knight of the Seraphim, 8 January 1847
  - Knight of the Order of Charles XIII, 1 December 1853
  - Special Sword medal in Gold, 1875
- Two Sicilies:
  - Knight of St. Januarius, 1847
  - Grand Cross of St. Ferdinand and Merit
- United Kingdom:
  - Honorary Grand Cross of the Bath (military), 1 January 1857
  - Stranger Knight of the Garter, 12 April 1861

Wilhelm Island is named after him.

== Ancestry ==
Ancestors of Wilhelm I

8. Prince Augustus William of Prussia
4. Frederick William II of Prussia
9. Duchess Luise of Brunswick-Wolfenbüttel
2. Frederick William III of Prussia
10. Louis IX, Landgrave of Hesse-Darmstadt
5. Princess Frederica Louisa of Hesse-Darmstadt
11. Countess Palatine Caroline of Zweibrücken
1. Wilhelm I, German Emperor
12. Duke Charles Louis Frederick of Mecklenburg-Strelitz
6. Charles II, Grand Duke of Mecklenburg-Strelitz
13. Princess Elisabeth Albertine of Saxe-Hildburghausen
3. Duchess Louise of Mecklenburg-Strelitz
14. Prince George William of Hesse-Darmstadt
7. Princess Friederike of Hesse-Darmstadt
15. Countess Maria Louise Albertine of Leiningen-Dagsburg-Falkenburg

== See also ==
- List of monarchs of Prussia
- Emperor William monuments
- Kamerun
- Togoland
- German South West Africa
- German New Guinea
- German East Africa
- German Samoa

== Notes ==
Wilhelm I House of Hohenzollern Born: 22 March 1797 Died: 9 March 1888
Regnal titles
Preceded by Frederick William IV	King of Prussia; 2 January 1861 – 9 March 1888	Succeeded by Frederick III
New creation Unification of Germany	German Emperor; 18 January 1871 – 9 March 1888	Succeeded by Frederick III
Preceded by Christian IX of Denmark	Duke of Saxe-Lauenburg; 1864–1876	Incorporated into the Prussian crown
Vacant Treaty of Vienna Title last held by Christian IX of Denmark	Duke of Schleswig and Holstein; 1864–1888	Incorporated into the Prussian crown
Preceded by Adolphe of Luxembourg as Duke of Nassau	Prince of Nassau; 1866–1888	Incorporated into the Prussian crown
Preceded by Frederick William of Hesse as Elector of Hesse	Landgrave of Hesse; Prince of Fulda; 1866–1888	Incorporated into the Prussian crown
Preceded by Karl Fellner as Elder Mayor of Frankfurt	Lord of Frankfurt; 1866–1888	Incorporated into the Prussian crown
Preceded by George V of Hanover as King of Hanover	Prince of East Friesland, Osnabrück, Hildesheim and Verden; Count of Lingen and Tecklenburg; 1866–1888	Incorporated into the Prussian crown
Political offices
Preceded by Francis Joseph I of Austria as Head of the Präsidialmacht of the German Confederation	Holder of the Bundespräsidium of the North German Confederation; 1 July 1867 – 18 January 1871	Confederation abolished German Empire proclaimed
