= Imperial Austrian Army (1806–1867) =

- Active: 1806–1867
- Country: Austria
- Type: Army
- Role: Defending the Austrian Empire from outside threats.
- Size: 400,000 men in 1848
- Engagements: Napoleonic Wars; First Italian War of Independence; Hungarian Revolution of 1848; Second Italian War of Independence; Second Schleswig War; Austro-Prussian War; Third Italian War of Independence
- Decorations: Military Order of Maria Theresa

Commanders
- Supreme Commander: Francis II (first); Franz Joseph I (last)
- Chief of the General Staff: Archduke Charles (first); Franz von John (last)
- Notable commanders: Josef Radetzky; Karl Philipp of Schwarzenberg; Archduke Charles, Duke of Teschen; Frederick Bianchi; Julius von Haynau

The Imperial Austrian Army formed the land forces of the Austrian Empire. It arose from the remains of the Imperial Army of the Holy Roman Emperor after its dissolution and in 1867 was reformed into the Common Army of Austria-Hungary and the Imperial-Royal Landwehr after the Austro-Hungarian Compromise of 1867. In addition to the army, there was also the Austrian Navy. The army took part in the Napoleonic Wars until 1815, the First Italian War of Independence, the Hungarian Revolution of 1848, the Second Italian War of Independence, the Second Schleswig War, the Third Italian War of Independence and the Austro-Prussian War. Notable generals were Josef Radetzky, Karl Philipp of Schwarzenberg, Archduke Charles, Duke of Teschen, Frederick Bianchi and Julius von Haynau.

== Organisation ==
=== Recruitment ===
Prior to 1852, the system of recruitment was complicated, with both volunteers and conscripts being utilised by the Austrian army; however, conscripts could pay others to take their place, and the upper classes were generally exempt entirely, all men in the Military Frontier region were potentially liable to a lifetime of military service. Conscripts were obligated to 14 years of service prior to 1845, when it was lowered to 8 years. Following this period of eight years, the Austrian conscripts (excluding Dalmatia and Tyrol) were then to serve in the Landwehr until 45 years old.

In 1852, this ramshackle method of recruitment was partially amended with 2 years of compulsory service across the entire empire, with reservists being used to supplement active units.

=== Formation size ===
==== 1836–51 ====
There was no standardised company size, with many units simultaneously understrength. Therefore, most companies counted only 80-160 men during this period, though a wartime strength was set with 206 per German regiment, 198 per Hungarian regiment and 178 for Grenadier regiments. This difference in numbers meant a Hungarian regiment was 1,300 men smaller than a German regiment.

==== 1851–66 ====
The reform of 1852 saw the company's strength fixed universally at 129 men in peacetime, and 221 in wartime. This would create a peacetime regimental strength of 2,830 and a wartime strength of 6,886. However, the company strength was later reduced to between 69-89 men in peacetime, and by 186,6 a wartime regimental strength was 4,143 equating to 168 men per company, a reduction of nearly 60 men. The depot battalions were up to 40-90 men smaller in peacetime, but in wartime, no size difference was substantial.

=== Infantry ===
==== 1836–50 ====
The infantry of the Austrian army was divided into 3 types: the Line (subdivided into German or Hungarian on a geographical basis), Grenzer and Jäger. The largest of the three was the Line, which in 1836 stood at 58 regiments.

A line regiment contained 3 field battalions of 6 companies each (2 companies forming a division, the basic tactical unit), 2 grenadier companies and a regimental staff. The grenadiers in practice were organised into battalions of 2 or 3 divisions. Attached to 50 of the line regiments were 2 Landwehr battalions, though in practice, only the first existed, and the second was a cadre of officers.

==== 1851–60 ====
In 1851-52 4 Grenzer regiments were converted into line regiments. This coincided with the Landwehr reform, where compulsory service replaced the Landwehr. The regiment was reorganised into 4 field battalions and 1 depot battalion (of 4 companies), and the grenadiers were returned to their regiments from their battalions. In 1857, the depot battalion was reduced to only exist in wartime and not during peacetime, with the 4th battalion becoming the depot battalion during peacetime in the Austro-Sardinian war of 1859. All of the infantry regiments raised their depot battalions to allow the field battalions to fight.

==== 1860–66 ====
The 62 regiments of 4 battalions were reorganised into 80 regiments of 3 battalions, with a depot battalion raised only during wartime (a reduction of 8 battalions). The Grenadier companies were also disbanded. For the Austro-Prussian War, every regiment raised its depot battalion and converted into a field battalion and raised a depot division, which was combined into 20 field battalions.

=== Cavalry ===
==== 1836–51 ====
The cavalry establishment in 1836 consisted of 8 Cuirassier regiments, 6 Dragoon regiments, seven Chevauxlégers regiments, twelve Hussar regiments and four Uhlan regiments.

==== 1851–59 ====
Following the conflicts of 1848, the Austrian cavalry was greatly reformed; the Chevauxlégers had 6 regiments converted to Uhlans and one to Dragoons. In 1854, another Uhlan and Dragoon regiments were raised. Thus, there were in 1854 8 Dragoon regiments, 12 Hussar, 12 Uhlan and 8 Cuirassier. The Dragoons and Cuirassiers, being classed as heavy cavalry, possessed 6 squadrons, with the Uhlans and Hussars containing 8. In 1852, a depot was formed per regiment, with it expanding in wartime to form a depot squadron.

Theoretically, the Austrian imperial cavalry had 288 squadrons and 10 depot squadrons with 66,121 men and 56,152 horses in 1859, which would have been expanded to 70,912 men and 60,992 horses following mobilisation; however, the cavalry was 16,000 horses short.

==== 1859–66 ====
Further reforms were introduced following the Austro-Sardinian war of 1859. The dragoons were reduced to 2 regiments as 4 were converted to Cuirassiers and 2 disbanded the 2 regiments left being labelled as light cavalry. Two new Hussar regiments raised from wartime volunteers were regularised in 1862 another Uhlan regiment was raised in this way too. Due to the nature of cavalry requiring long training the proportion of serves to active troops was considerably lower with the cavalry almost always being maintained as close to full strength as possible.

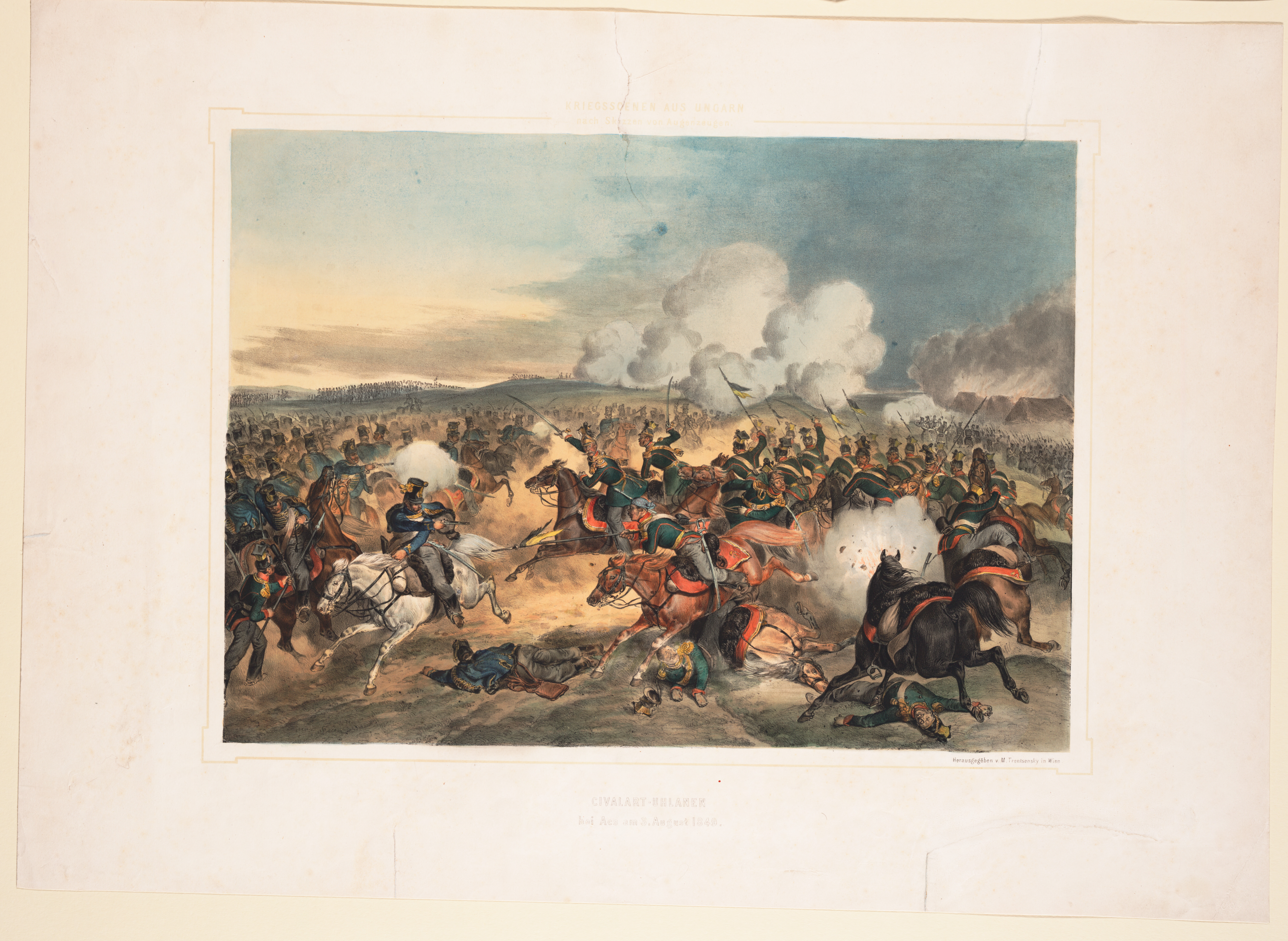
Austrian Uhlans battling Hungarian Hussars formerly loyal to the empire.

Cavalry regiment organisation 1859-1866
Unit name	Peacetime (men)	Peacetime (horse)	Wartime (men)	Wartime (horse)
Heavy cavalry				
Regimental staff	44	8	52	24
squadron	194	170	194	170
depot	43	23	141	113
Total (6 squadrons)	1,251	1,051	1,357	1,157
Light Cavalry				
Regimental Staff	52	10	60	27
squadron	227	200	227	200
depot	53	29	174	143
Total (8 squadrons)	1,921	1,639	2,050	1,770

== History ==
=== Formation of the k.k. Army and Napoleonic Wars ===
After the dissolution of the Holy Roman Empire of the German Nation, the Imperial Army became the Imperial-Royal Army. Because of several defeats by Napoleon, recently at Ulm & Austerlitz, serious military reforms began under Archduke Charles in order not to repeat the previous setbacks in the future. In 1809, the Austrian Empire formed a new coalition against the French Empire and invaded the Kingdom of Bavaria, which was allied with the French.

After the Austrian army was defeated in the battles of Landshut & Eckmühl, it began to retreat into its own territory. Austria hoped that Prussia and Russia would intervene, but, partly because of the indecisiveness of King Frederick William III of Prussia. and the unwillingness of Alexander I of Russia, did not materialize at first. After the Grande Armée had occupied Vienna, they met the Imperial-Royal Army at Aspern and Essling. The Battle of Aspern-Essling that followed ended in Napoleon's first defeat on the battlefield. At the Battle of Wagram, the Austrian army finally lost after heavy fighting and Austria was forced to sign the Peace of Schönbrunn, ending the War of the Fifth Coalition.

In 1812, the Austrian Empire was forced to take part in the French invasion of Russia, although its troops saw little fighting and did not participate in the main advance on Moscow. Austria joined the Sixth Coalition the following year and played a crucial role in Napoleon's downfall. After being defeated at the Battle of Dresden, coalition forces withdrew into Bohemia and then invaded the Kingdom of Saxony again after a counteroffensive at Kulm. At the Battle of Leipzig, in which almost 600,000 soldiers took part, Napoleon was decisively defeated by Karl Philipp, Prince of Schwarzenberg and the Confederation of the Rhine, founded by Napoleon, dissolved. In the meantime, the Austrians successfully retook the Dalmatian coast and fought to a stalemate in Northern Italy until Napoleon's defeat. In 1814, coalition armies captured Paris, forcing Napoleon to sign and abdicate the Peace Treaties of Fontainebleau and Paris. In the Seventh Coalition, the Austrian army fought mainly against the Kingdom of Naples under Joachim Murat, who was decisively defeated at the Battle of Tolentino by Frederick Bianchi. Austrian armies were preparing to invade France via Alsace and Italy, but the Allied victory at the Battle of Waterloo meant these advancing armies fought only a few skirmishes.

=== Concert of Europe ===
After the Napoleonic Wars, the k.k. Army put down the Carbonari uprisings in the Kingdom of the Two Sicilies and Savoyard state in 1821 and the Kraków uprising in Galicia in 1846.

=== Italian & Hungarian Wars of Independence ===
When revolutions broke out in 1848, the army was deployed to put them down. a popular uprising came about in Hungary, which initially aimed for more autonomy in the empire, but was finally fought for the independence of the Hungarian half of the empire. The k.k. Army under Radetzky & Julius von Haynau and the help of the Imperial Russian Army secured the Habsburg Monarchy's survival. The Kingdom of Sardinia, hoping to acquire Lombardy and Veneto from an Austria distracted by the uprisings, declared the First Italian War of Independence. Field Marshal Josef Radetzky, who led the army in northern Italy, had previously had to evacuate Milan because of violent revolts. After the Victory of Custoza, Piedmont-Sardinia signed an armistice; however, this was broken the following year again. After a joint Italian army was again decisively defeated by Josef Radetzky at the Battle of Novara, King Charles Albert of Sardinia abdicated in favor of his son Victor Emmanuel II, and Piedmont signed a peace treaty with the Austrian Empire.

During the Second Italian War of Independence, the Imperial-Royal Army fought against the Second French Empire and the Kingdom of Piedmont-Sardinia. It was ultimately defeated by the Franco-Piedmontese troops at the Battle of Solferino. As a result of this defeat, 60 generals were retired and Ludwig von Benedek was appointed the new commander-in-chief to advance the modernization of the army.

=== Second Schleswig War and Austro-Prussian War ===
In 1864, Austria and Prussia fought the Second Schleswig War over the duchies of Schleswig and Holstein. The Austrian army won every land battle in this war – the Battle for Königshügel, Battle of Sankelmark, Battle of Vejle and the taking of Danevirke and Frederica Fortress.

Austria & Prussia confronted each other for the last time over which power should have leadership and unite Germany in the Austro-Prussian War. The war resulted with a disastrous Austrian defeat at Königgrätz, and although the Austrians outperformed the Italians at Custoza & Lissa, it didn't stop the Prussians from advancing to Vienna.

After the defeat in the war of 1866, which Austria had waged together with allies in the German Confederation as part of the federal execution against Prussia, Emperor Franz Joseph I was forced in 1866/1867 to appease Hungary, which had been in passive resistance since the failed attempts at secession in 1849, with the grant of partial sovereignty and the conversion of the monarchy, which had previously been run as a single unit, into the so-called "Dual Monarchy". The Hungarian half of the empire received the right, in addition to the Austro-Hungarian Army (now Common Army, which was subordinate to the Minister of War) to set up its own territorial forces from 1867, the Royal Hungarian Honvéd (Hungarian: Királyi Honvédség). It was subordinate to the Hungarian Ministry of War.

The common army of Austria-Hungary used the preceding designation k.k. until 1889, and from 1889 the corresponding k.u.k.

== See also ==
- Army of the Holy Roman Empire
- Imperial Army (Holy Roman Empire)
- Austrian Army during the French Revolutionary and Napoleonic Wars

For the period after 1867:

- Armed Forces of Austria-Hungary
- Austro-Hungarian Army
- Common Army
