= Austro-Hungarian General Staff =

Part of the Austro-Hungarian Ministry of War

Imperial and Royal General Staff
- k.u.k. Generalstab
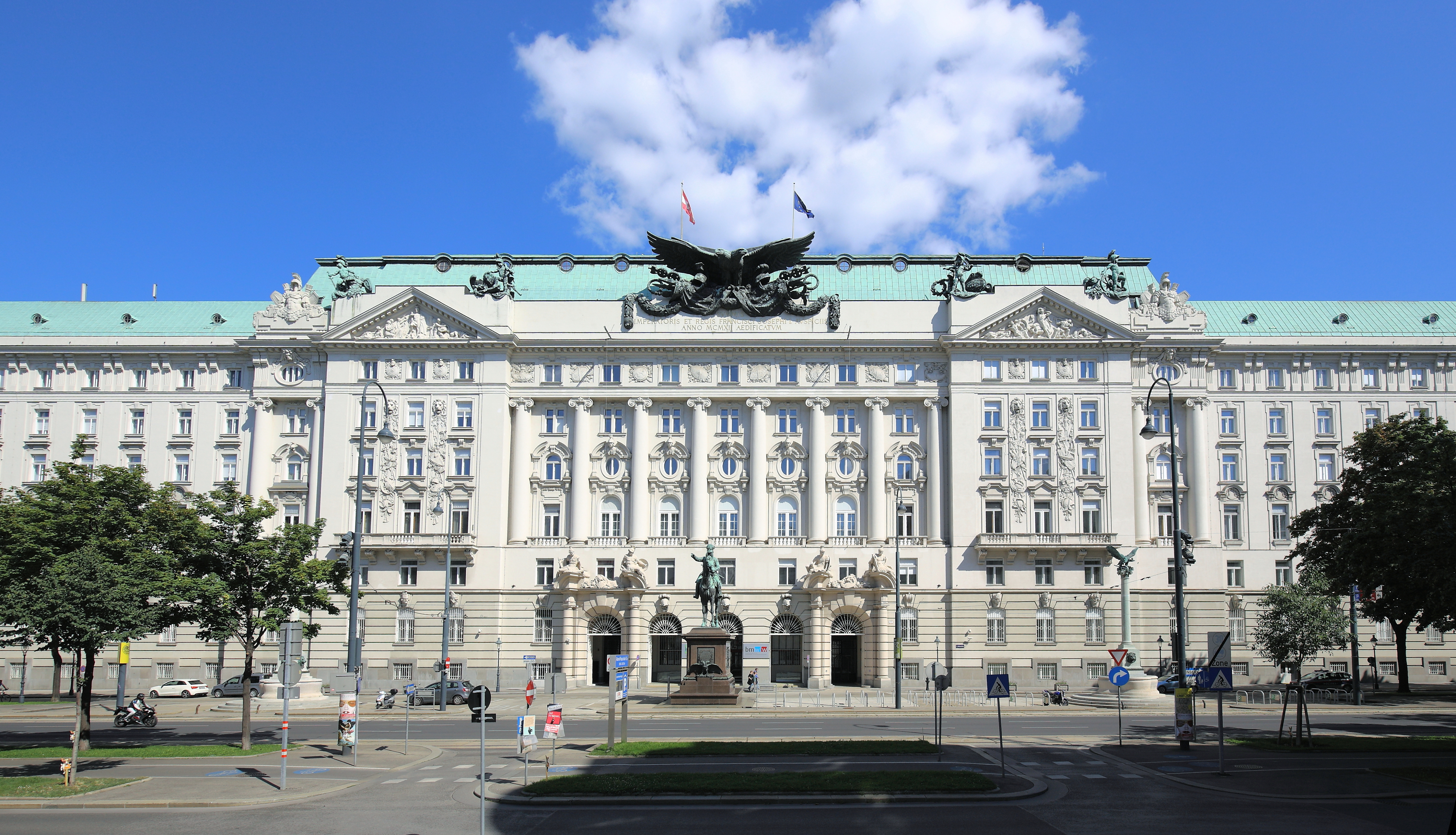
- General Staff building on Ringstraße, Vienna
- Active: 1867–1918
- Country: Austria-Hungary
- Allegiance: Armed Forces
- Branch: Active duty
- Type: Staff
- Part of: Ministry of War
- Garrison/HQ: Ringstrasse, Vienna

Commanders
- First Chief: Feldmarschall-Leutant Franz von John
- Last Chief: Generaloberst Arthur Arz von Straußenburg

The Imperial and Royal General Staff (German: k.u.k. Generalstab; Hungarian: Cs. es K. Vezérkar) of Austria-Hungary was part of the Ministry of War. It was headed by the Chief of the General Staff for the Whole Armed Forces (Chef des Generalstabes für die gesamte bewaffnete Macht; Az egész Fegyveres Erők Vezérkari Főnöke), who had direct access to the Emperor.

== Responsibilities ==
The general staff was responsible for planning and preparations, while the Armeeoberkommando (AOK) was the operational high command. In fact, since the AOK was under the direct command of the Emperor and the Chief of the General Staff was his chief adviser, in practice the AOK was under the control of the Chief of the General Staff.

== List of chiefs of the general staff ==
† denotes people who died in office.

No.	Portrait	Chef des k.u.k. Generalstab	Took office	Left office	Time in office
1	Franz von John	Feldmarschall-Leutant; Franz von John (1815–1876)	20 December 1867	1869	1–2 years
2	Josef Wilhelm von Gallina [fr]	Feldmarschall-Leutant; Josef Wilhelm von Gallina (1820–1883)	1869	1874	4–5 years
3	Franz von John	Feldzeugmeister; Franz von John (1815–1876)	1874	25 May 1876 †	1–2 years
4	Anton von Schönfeld	Feldmarschall-Leutant; Anton von Schönfeld (1827–1898)	4 June 1876	1881	4–5 years
5	Friedrich von Beck-Rzikowsky	Feldzeugmeister; Friedrich von Beck-Rzikowsky (1830–1920)	1881	1906	24–25 years
6	Franz Conrad von Hötzendorf	General der Infanterie; Franz Conrad von Hötzendorf (1852–1925)	1906	1911	4–5 years
7	Blasius von Schemua	Generalmajor; Blasius von Schemua (1856–1920)	3 December 1911	12 December 1912	1 year, 9 days
8	Franz Conrad von Hötzendorf	Generalfeldmarschall; Franz Conrad von Hötzendorf (1852–1925)	12 December 1912	1 March 1917	4 years, 79 days
9	Arthur Arz von Straußenburg	Generaloberst; Arthur Arz von Straußenburg (1857–1935)	1 March 1917	3 November 1918	1 year, 247 days

== See also ==
- Supreme Commander of the Imperial and Royal Armed Forces
