= Alsen Cross =

Alsen Cross Alsenkreuz
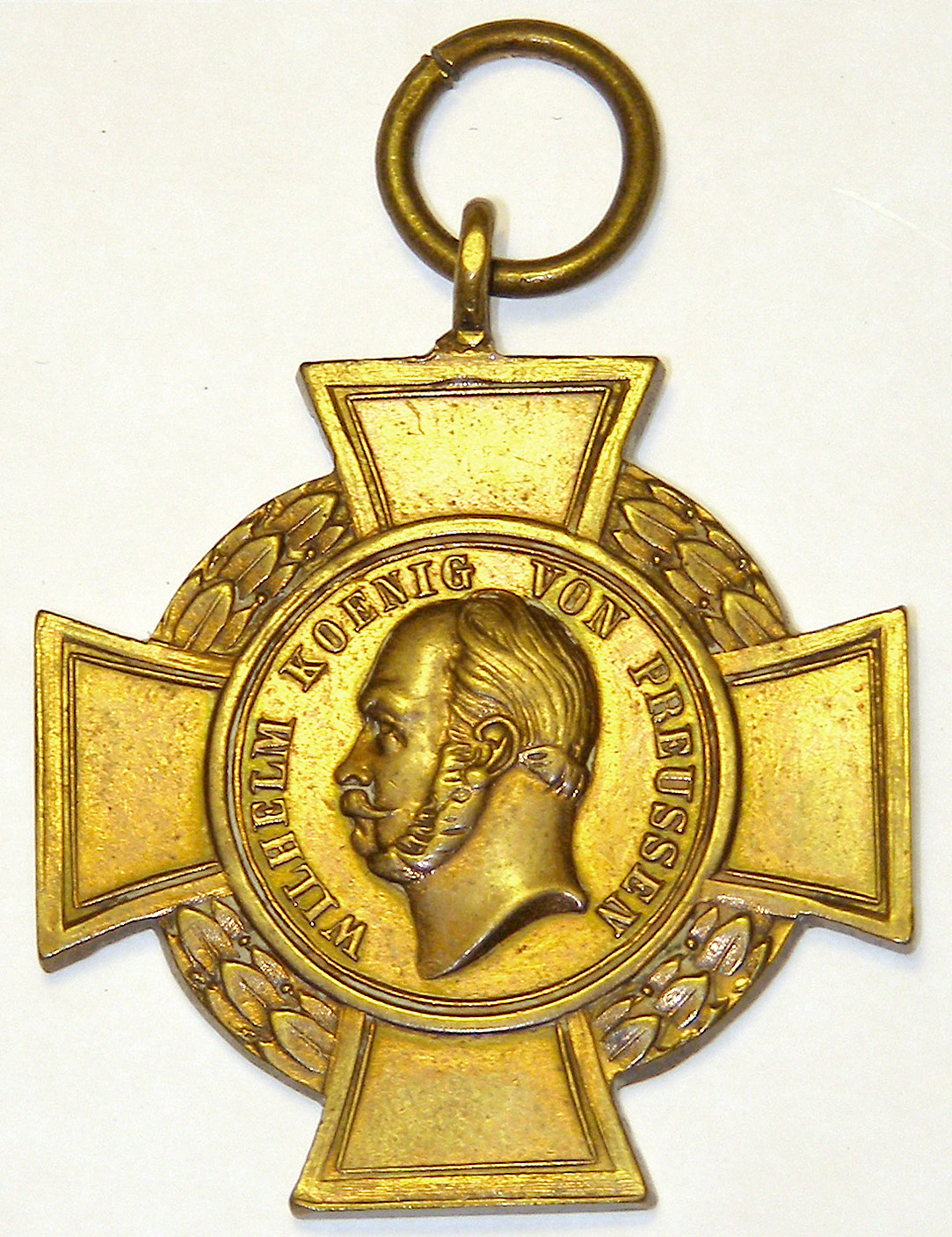
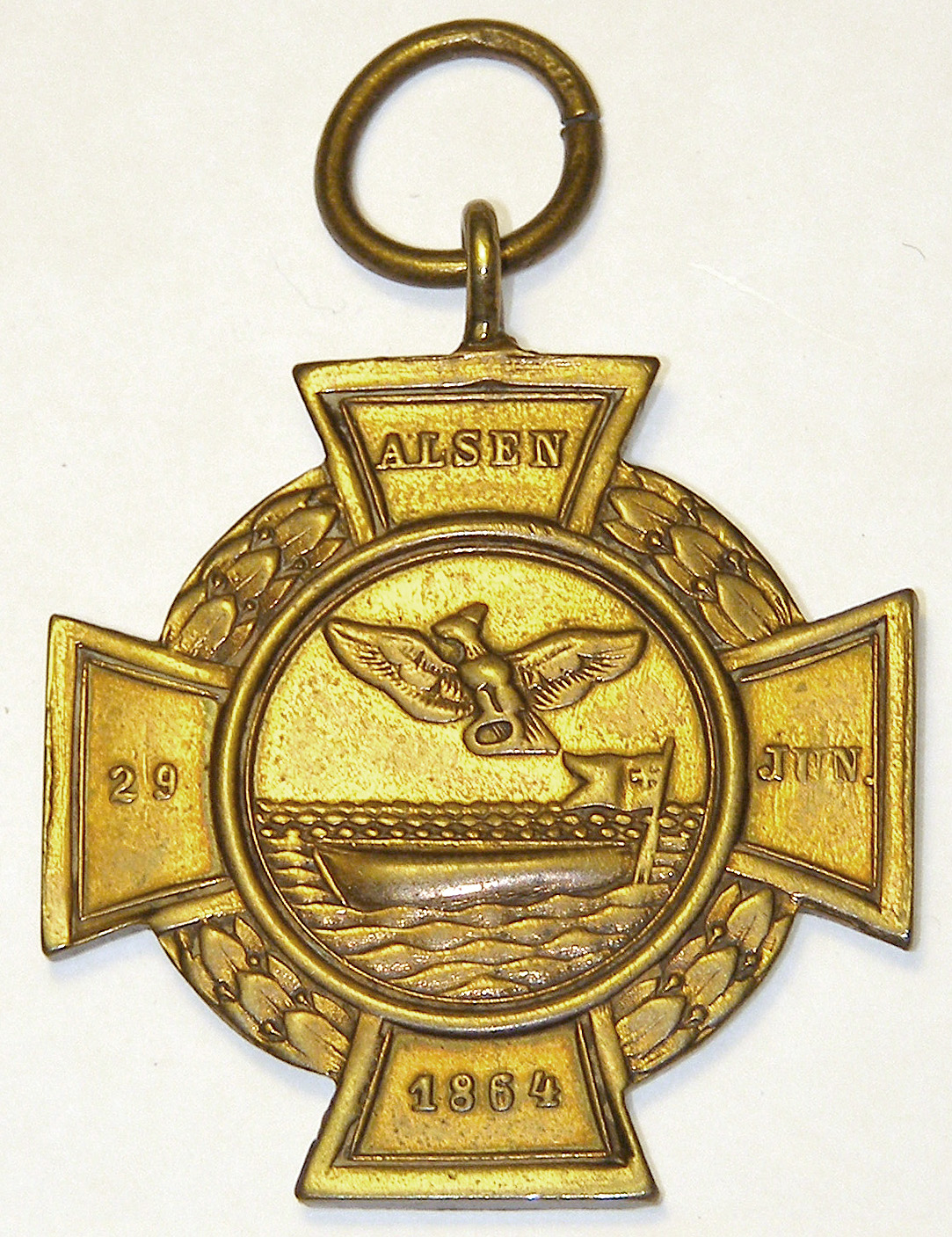
- Obverse and reverse of the Alsen Cross
- Type: Military medal
- Awarded for: Service in the Battle of Alsen during the Second Schleswig War
- Presented by: the Kingdom of Prussia
- Clasps: None
- Established: 7 December 1864

Order of Wear
- Next (higher): Duppel Storm Cross
- Next (lower): War Commemorative Medal of 1813/15

The Alsen Cross (German: Alsenkreuz) was a military medal of the Kingdom of Prussia. Established 7 December 1864, the medal commemorates the Prussian victory on 29 June 1864 during the Battle of Alsen. The medal was initially awarded with two different suspension ribbons, for combatants and noncombatants. It was subsequently extended to those troops held in reserve at the battle and members of the Johanniter Orden who participated in the battle.
