= Duppel Storm Cross =

Düppel Storm Cross Düppeler-Sturmkreuz
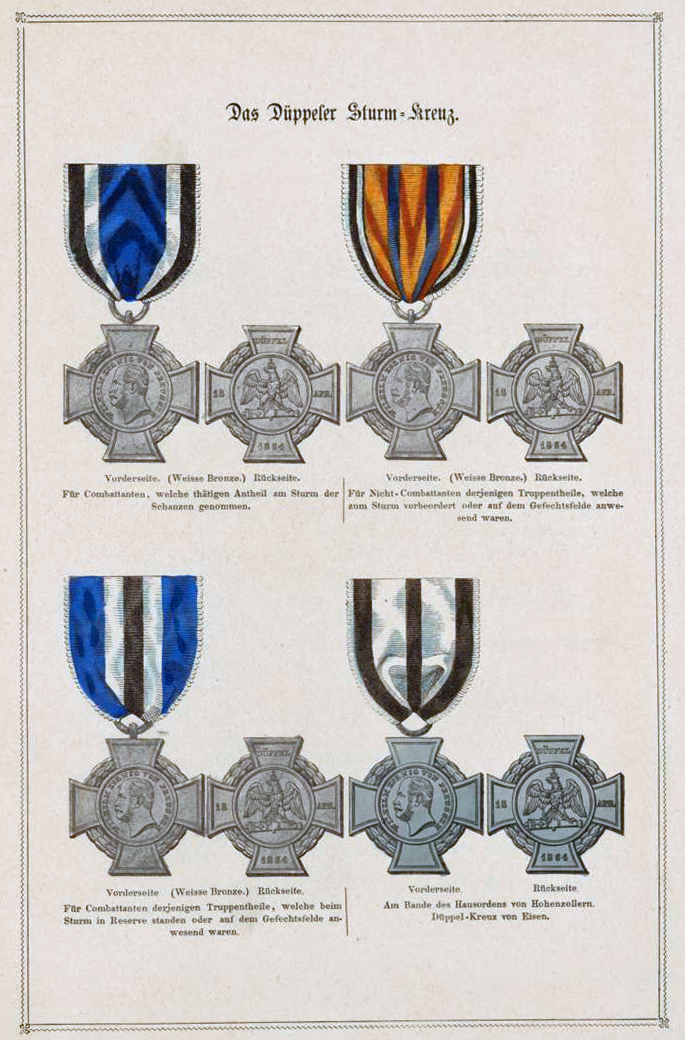
- The Düppel Storm Cross with its four ribbons
- Type: Military medal
- Awarded for: Military personnel who took part in capture of the Dybbøl trenches.
- Presented by: the Kingdom of Prussia
- Established: 18 October 1864
- Combatants Non-combatants Reserve troops Johanniter Orden recipients

Order of Wear
- Next (higher): Princely House Order of Hohenzollern, Honor Cross 2nd and 3rd Class, with and without swords
- Next (lower): Alsen Cross

The Düppel Storm Cross (German: Düppeler-Sturmkreuz) was a military medal of the Kingdom of Prussia. The cross was awarded to Prussian participants in the Battle of Dybbøl (Düppeler Schanzen) which took place on 18 April 1864, during the Second Schleswig War. Established by Wilhelm, King of Prussia on 18 October 1864, the cross was initially awarded to combatants and noncombatants who directly participated in the battle. The following year, versions were created for those troops held in reserve at the battle and members of the Johanniter Orden who participated in the battle.

== Appearance ==
=== Medal ===
The Düppel Storm Cross was designed by Friedrich Wilhelm Kullrich, a Prussian court medalist. It was the first of three commemorative crosses awarded during the 1860s with similar designs. The medal is in the shape of a cross pattée. Visible between the arms of the cross is a laurel wreath. Superimposed in the center of the cross is a round medallion. On the obverse, the medallion bears the left-facing effigy of King Wilhelm I circumscribed are the words WILHELM KOENIG VON PREUSSEN (William King of Prussia). The medallion on the reverse depicts a crowned Prussian eagle perched upon a Danish cannon. The top arm of the cross has the word DÜPPEL, the left arm of the cross has 18, the right arm has APR., and the bottom arm of the cross bears the year 1864.

A version for members of the Johanniter Orden was identical in design but made of nielloed iron.

=== Ribbons ===
The combatants ribbon (Kämpferband), was a 32 mm wide blue silk ribbon, in the color of the Prussian Crown Order ribbon. At the edges were a black stripe and white stripe, with a very thin white stripe on the outside edge.

The non-combatants ribbon (Nichtkämpferband) was of orange silk, the edges were thin stripes of white, black and white. The orange was divided into thirds by two thin blue stripes.

The ribbon for troops held in reserve (Band für Reservetruppen) was blue with thin white edges. In the center were wide stripes of white, black and white.

The ribbon for Johanniter Orden recipients was suspended from the ribbon of the House Order of Hohenzollern (Bande des Hausordens von Hohenzollern). This ribbon is white, with a black central stripe and black stripes near the edge.
