= Franz von John =

Austrian general (1815–1876)

Franz Freiherr von John
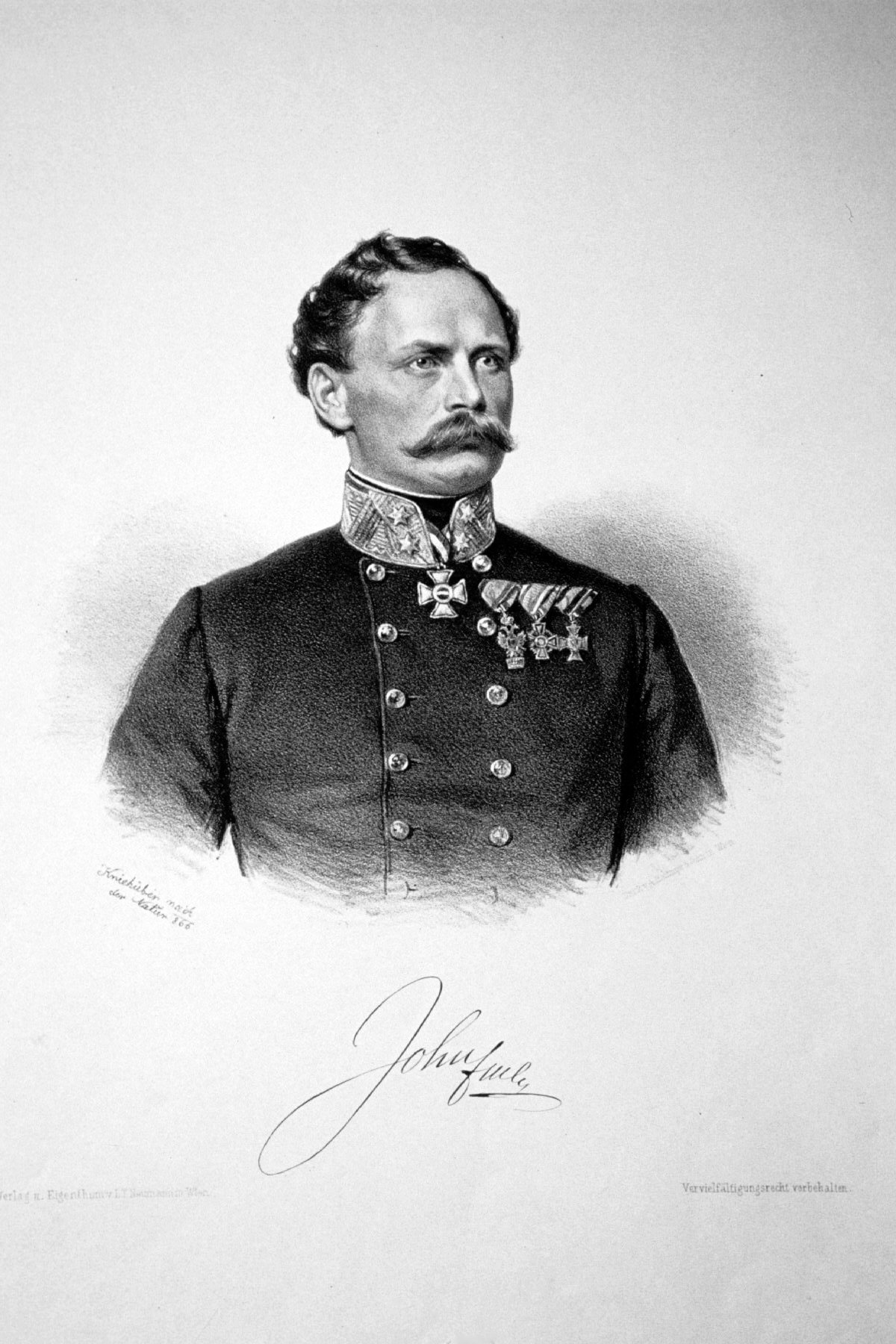
- Born: 20 November 1815; Bruck an der Leitha
- Died: 25 May 1876 (aged 60) Vienna
- Allegiance: Austrian Empire
- Service years: 1835–1876
- Rank: Feldzeugmeister
- Commands: Chief of the General Staff; Minister of War
- Conflicts: First Italian War of Independence: Battle of Goito; Second Italian War of Independence Third Italian War of Independence: Battle of Custoza (1866)
- Awards: Military Order of Maria Theresa

Franz Freiherr von John (20 November 1815 – 25 May 1876) was an Austrian Feldzeugmeister, Chief of the General Staff, and Minister of War.

== Biography ==
Franz Freiherr von John was born in Bruck an der Leitha as the fourth child of an Austrian officer. He was schooled at the military academy in Wiener Neustadt and joined the Archduke Franz Karl Infantry Regiment Nr. 52 in 1835 as a lieutenant. In 1845 he served as a lieutenant on the General Quartermaster staff. In 1848 he served under Radetzky as a captain during the First Italian War of Independence where he distinguished himself at Goito.

In 1857 he was promoted to colonel, ennobled as a Baron, and became a regimental commander. In 1859 he was chief of staff of the VI Army Corps in South Tyrol. In 1861 he was promoted to major general and became the head of the General Staff of the Italian army commanded by Benedek.

When the Austro-Prussian War started, John remained chief of staff of the South Army in Italy under the command of Archduke Albrecht. During the campaign he distinguished himself at the Battle of Custoza (24 June 1866) and was promoted Feldmarschall-Leutnant on the battlefield. After the defeat of Benedek's North Army at Königgrätz, he accompanied the Archduke to the northern theatre of war.

In September 1866 he became Chief of Staff of the Austrian Army (September 1866 – March 1869) and in November 1866 he also became Minister of War (November 1866 – January 1868). The same year he was appointed a lifelong member of the House of Lords. As war minister, John served in the governments led by Count Belcredi, Count Beust and Prince Auersperg. During his time as war minister he carried out an army reform based on general conscription.

In December 1868 he became Inhaber of Infanterie Regiment Nr. 76.

In March 1869 he resigned as chief of the general staff and became commanding general in Graz. In 1873 John was promoted to Feldzeugmeister. In 1874 he again became Chief of the General Staff of the army, a post he held until his death in Vienna on 25 May 1876.

== Notes ==
Military offices
Preceded by Heinrich von Henikstein	Chief of the General Staff; 1866–1869	Succeeded by Friedrich von Beck-Rzikowsky
Political offices
Preceded by Franz Folliot de Crenneville	Minister of War; 1866–1868	Succeeded by Alexander von Koller
