= Matthias Weischer =

German painter (born 1973)

- Born: 1973 (age 52–53); Elte, North Rhine-Westphalia, West Germany
- Occupation: Painter
- Website: matthiasweischer.de

Matthias Weischer (born 1973) is a German painter living in Leipzig. He is considered to be part of the New Leipzig School.

== Life ==
Born in Elte, North Rhine-Westphalia, Weischer studied painting from 1995 to 2001 and received his MA in 2003 from Hochschule für Grafik und Buchkunst (HGB) in Leipzig. He was a student in the master class of Professor Sighard Gille. In 2002, he was a co-founder of the artist-initiated gallery LIGA in Berlin that was run by eleven former HGB students, among them Christoph Ruckhäberle, Tim Eitel, David Schnell and Tilo Baumgärtel. LIGA was closed after two years in 2004. After cooperating with Galerie Kleindienst (Leipzig), Anthony Wilkinson (London) and EIGEN + Art (Leipzig/Berlin) Weischer is currently represented by König Gallery (Berlin) and Grimm Gallery (Amsterdam). His studio is located at the Leipzig Cotton Mill.

== Work ==
Weischers works oscillate between abstract and figurative painting. Until 2006, his paintings depicted deserted interiors like stage settings that are infused with abstract elements. Furniture, everyday objects, and large-scale ornaments stylistically refer to the 1950s and 1960s. In their collage-like appearance, they establish a complex and ambiguous relationship.

During his residency in Rome in 2007, Weischer concentrated on drawing and studies on nature and landscape. Since then, he predominantly works on and with paper, in smaller formats and with a lighter range of colors. He also explores different printing techniques and, recently, three-dimensional sculptural arrangements.

Since 2001, his work has been exhibited worldwide, e.g. in London (2003), Miami (2004), at the Venice Biennale, the Cleveland Museum of Art, in Chungnam, Korea (2005), The Hague, Málaga (2008), Ponce, Puerto Rico (2011), Hong Kong (2015) and Amsterdam (2017).

Among the public and private collections holding works by Matthias Weischer are the Museum of Contemporary Art, Los Angeles, Gemeentemuseum Den Haag, The Hague, Arken Museum of Modern Art, Denmark, Arario Collection, Corea, Museum der bildenden Künste, Leipzig, Rubel Family Collection, Miami and Susan and Michael Hort, New York.

== Solo exhibitions ==
- 2001: Galerie Kleindienst, Leipzig
- 2002: Räumen, Kunsthaus Essen
- 2003: Anthony Wilkinson Gallery, London
- 2003: 3 Zimmer, Diele, Bad, LIGA, Berlin
- 2004: simultan, Künstlerhaus Bremen
- 2005: Museum der bildenden Künste Leipzig (Art award of the Leipziger Volkszeitung)
- 2006: Ludwig Forum für Internationale Kunst, Aachen
- 2006: Galerie EIGEN + ART, Berlin
- 2006: Arbeiten auf Papier, Kunstverein Konstanz; Kunstverein Ulm
- 2007: Der Garten – Arbeiten auf Papier, Neuer Berliner Kunstverein
- 2007: Museum zu Allerheiligen Schaffhausen; Kunsthalle Mannheim
- 2008: Gemeentemuseum Den Haag
- 2008: Der Garten – Arbeiten auf Papier, Kloster Bentlage, Rheine
- 2008: Room with a view, CAC Málaga - Centro de Arte Contemporáneo de Málaga
- 2009: Room with a view, Kunsthalle Mainz
- 2010: In Monte Carlo, Galerie EIGEN + ART, Leipzig
- 2011: Alice, Armin und all die anderen. Auf Papier, Museum der bildenden Künste Leipzig; Kunstverein Bremerhaven
- 2011: Obra nueva/New works, Museo de Arte de Ponce, Puerto Rico
- 2013: Thicket, GRIMM Gallery, Amsterdam
- 2014: The Vincent Award Room: Matthias Weischer., Gemeentemuseum Den Haag
- 2014: Matthias Weischer, TAJAN, Paris
- 2015: Matthias Weischer: Das druckgraphische Werk, Akademie Franz-Hitz-Haus, Münster
- 2015: traces to nowhere, Lehmann Maupin Gallery, Hong Kong
- 2015: Matthias Weischer, König Gallery, Berlin
- 2016: Matthias Weischer - Grafik von 2005-2016, Thaler Originalgrafik, Leipzig
- 2016: In und auf Papier, Kloster Bentlage, Rheine
- 2017: Bankett, Grimm Gallery, Amsterdam
- 2019: Matthias Weischer, König Gallery, Berlin
- 2020: Stage, Grimm Gallery, New York
- 2020: Matthias Weischer, König Tokio Gallery, Tokyo
- 2020: Bühne, Drents Museum, Assen, Netherlands

== Selected group exhibitions ==
- 2000: "LIGA", Steibs Hof, Leipzig
- 2000: "lokal", Galerie EIGEN + ART, Leipzig
- 2001: "Szenenwechsel XX", Museum für Moderne Kunst Frankfurt am Main
- 2001: Galerie Kleindienst, Leipzig
- 2002: Galerie EIGEN + ART, Leipzig
- 2002: "6 aus 11", LIGA, Berlin
- 2003: "sieben mal malerei", Neuer Leipziger Kunstverein im Museum der bildenden Künste Leipzig
- 2004: "Northern Light", Rubell Family Collection, Miami
- 2004: "Life After Death. New Leipzig Paintings from the Rubell Family Collection", Rubell Family Collection, Miami; MASS MoCA, North Adams; SITE Santa Fe, New Mexico; Katzen Arts Center Museum, Washington D.C.; Frye Art Museum, Seattle; Salt Lake Art Center, Salt Lake City; Kemper Museum of Contemporary Art, Kansas City (bis 2008)
- 2005: "David, Matthes und ich", Kunstverein Nürnberg; Kunstverein Bielefeld
- 2005: "Cold Hearts. Artists from Leipzig", Arario Gallery, Cheonan, Korea
- 2005: "51. Biennale di Venezia. The Experience of Art", Venice
- 2005: "The Triumph of Painting. Part 3", Saatchi Gallery, London
- 2006: "Deutsche Wandstücke. Sette scene di nuova pittura germanica", Museion Bozen
- 2006: "Netherlands v. Germany - Painting/Malerei", GEM Museum voor actuele kunst, The Hague
- 2006: "Artists from Leipzig", Arario Beijing
- 2006: "Imagination Becomes Reality. Part V: Fantasy and Fiction", Sammlung Goetz, Munich
- 2007: "Rockers Island. Werke aus der Sammlung Olbricht", Museum Folkwang Essen
- 2007: "Weischer meets Beckmann", Kunsthalle Mannheim
- 2008: "Germania contemporanea. Dipingere è narrare", MART - Museo d'arte moderna e contemporanea di Trento e Rovereto
- 2008: "The Leipzig Phenomenon", Műcsarnok Kunsthalle, Budapest
- 2008: "New Leipzig School", Cobra Museum, Amstelveen
- 2008: "Interieur/Exterieur. Wohnen in der Kunst", Kunstmuseum Wolfsburg
- 2010: "Parallels: Young contemporary painting from Norway/Leipzig", Kistefos Museum, Jevnaker
- 2010: "'Die Bilder tun was mit mir ...'. Einblicke in die Sammlung Frieder Burda", Museum Frieder Burda, Baden-Baden
- 2012: "Sidetracks – Painting in the paramodern continuum", Stavanger Art Museum
- 2012: "Atelier + Küche – Labore der Sinne", Marta Herford
- 2013: Nightfall, Rudolfinum, Prag* 2012: "Paintings/Pinturas. The Rubell Family Collection", Sala de Arte Santander, Madrid
- 2013: The inevitable figuration, Centro per l'arte contemporanea Luigi Pecci, Prato
- 2013: Schöne Landschaft - Bedrohte Natur: Alte Meister im Dialog mit zeitgenössischer Kunst, Kunsthalle Osnabrück
- 2013: Ortsbestimmung - Zeitgenössische Kunst aus Sachsen, Kulturhistorisches Museum Görlitz
- 2013: Donation Florence et Daniel Guerlain, Centre Pompidou, Paris
- 2014: This side of Paradise, S|2 Sotheby's, London
- 2015: All the worlds a stage - works from the Goetz Collection; Fundacion Banco Santander, Madrid
- 2015: Offen auf AEG: Druckgrafische Arbeiten Auf AEG, Nürnberg
- 2015: Camera Obscura - Malerei von David Schnell, Matthias Weischer und Christoph Ruckhäberle, Neuer Pfaffenhofener Kunstverein, Pfaffenhofen
- 2015: Made in Germany, Highpoint Printmaking Center, Minneapolis
- 2016: "Maroc", ASPN Gallery, Leipzig
- 2016: Aufschlussreiche Räume - Interieur als Portrait, Museum Morsbroich, Leverkusen
- 2017: Künstlerräume II, Gallery Karsten Greve, Cologne
- 2017: Three Positions. Six Directions, König Gallery, Berlin
- 2017: Germany 8: Next Generation - Young German Art, White Box Art Center, Peking
- 2019: Away in the Hill, Grimm Gallery, New York

== Awards ==
- 2001: Scholarship Junge Kunst, Kunsthaus Essen
- 2003: Scholarship Stiftung Kunstfonds zur Förderung der zeitgenössischen bildenden Kunst, Bonn
- 2004: Protégé of Mentor David Hockney - Rolex Mentor and Protégé Arts Initiative
- 2005: August Macke Prize
- 2005: Art award of the Leipziger Volkszeitung
- 2007: Scholarship of the Deutsche Akademie Rom Villa Massimo, Rome
- 2012: Scholarship Civitella Ranieri Foundation
- 2017: Eduard Arnhold Scholarship

== Publications ==
- Michael Hametner: Auf der Bühne. 15 Gespräche – ein Porträt des Malers Matthias Weischer. Mitteldeutscher Verlag 2016. (German/Englisch) ISBN 978-3-95462-643-4.
- Matthias Weischer. Obra nueva/New work, exh. cat. Museo de Arte de Ponce, Puerto Rico 2011. (Spanish/English) ISBN 978-0-9830208-6-8
- Kunstwerkstatt Matthias Weischer, Prestel Verlag, Munich 2011. (German) ISBN 978-3-7913-4449-2
- Matthias Weischer. Room with a view, exh. cat. Kunsthalle Mainz, Sparkasse Essen 2009. (German/English) ISBN 978-3-941185-36-4
- Matthias Weischer. In the Space Between, exh. cat. CAC Málaga 2008. (Spanish) ISBN 978-84-96159-69-3
- Matthias Weischer. Der Garten. Arbeiten auf Papier/The Garden. Works on Paper, exh. cat. Neuer Berliner Kunstverein; Kloster Bentlage, Rheine 2007. (German/English) ISBN 978-3-7757-2042-7
- Matthias Weischer. Malerei/Painting, exh. cat. Museum zu Allerheiligen Schaffhausen, Kunsthalle Mannheim, Gemeentemuseum Den Haag 2007. (German/English) ISBN 978-3-7757-1904-9
- The triumph of painting. Matthias Weischer, Eberhard Havekost, Dexter Dalwood, Dana Schutz, Michael Raedecker, Inka Essenhigh, London 2005. ISBN 978-3-86560-015-8
- Matthias Weischer. Simultan, exh. cat. Künstlerhaus Bremen 2004. (German/English) ISBN 978-3-7757-1495-2
