= Aris Kalaizis =

German-Greek painter (born 1966)

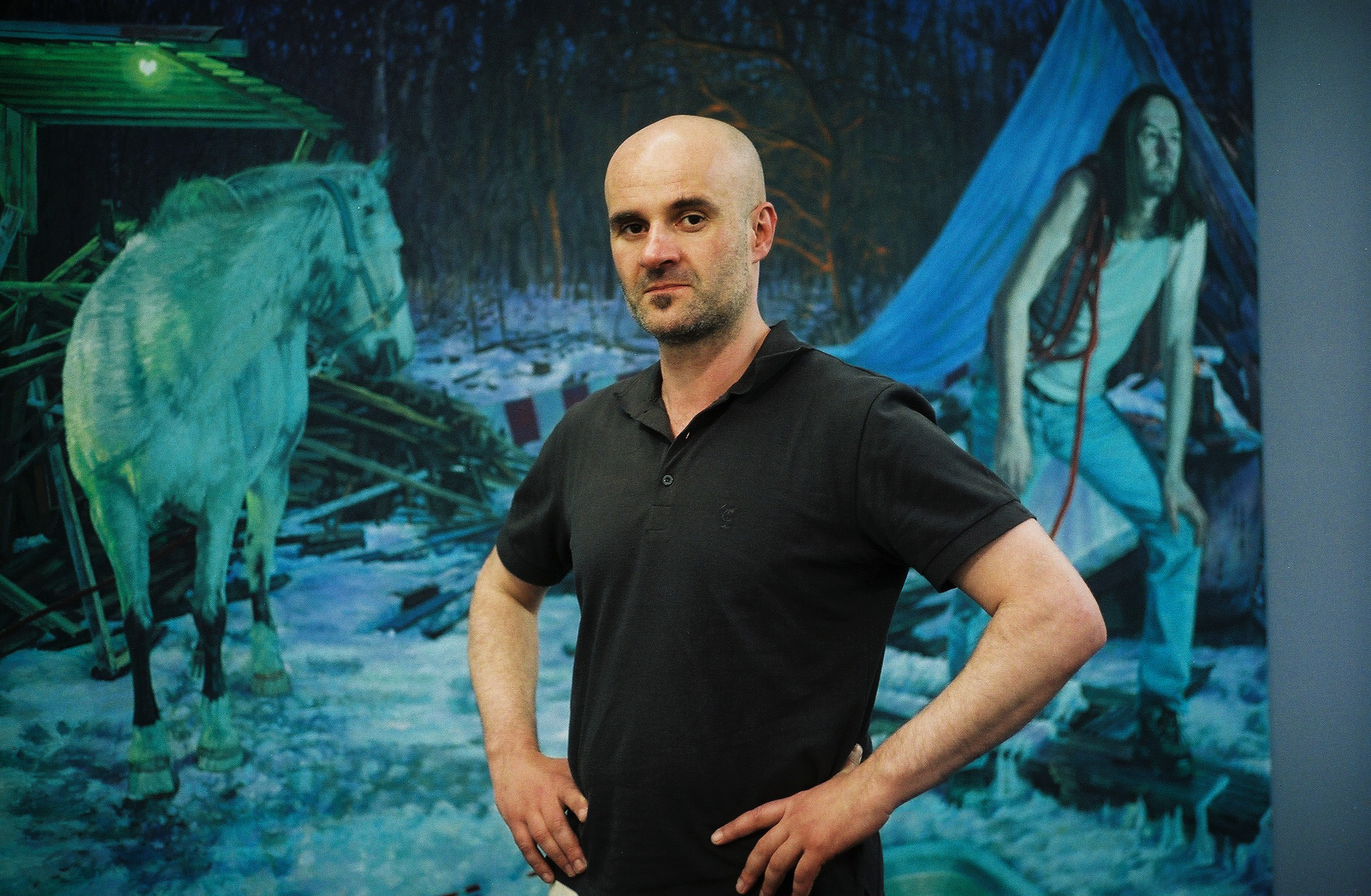
- Aris Kalaizis
- Born: Aris Kalaizis; 1966 (age 59–60); Leipzig, East Germany (now Germany)
- Education: Hochschule für Grafik und Buchkunst Leipzig
- Known for: Painting
- Movement: New Leipzig School

Aris Kalaizis (Greek: Άρης Καλαϊζής, born 1966 in Leipzig) is a figurative Greek-German painter. He is associated with the New Leipzig School.

== Biography ==
Aris Kalaizis grew up, as the son of a Greek political immigrants (Greek Civil War), in Leipzig. His parents came in 1949 as children as a result of the Greek Civil War (1946-1949) to Leipzig. After an apprenticeship in offset printing and later having been trained as a photo technician, he began his studies in painting in 1992 under the supervision of Prof. Arno Rink and his assistant Neo Rauch at the Academy of Visual Arts Leipzig (Hochschule für Grafik und Buchkunst), from which he graduated with summa cum laude in 1997.

He was a master student of Arno Rink from 1997 to 2000. His first individual public exhibition took place in 2005 and was curated by the Marburger Kunstverein.

In 2007 he presented his works in New York City for the first time. International recognition followed, after his participation at the Biennale di Venezia (12. Mostra Internazionale di Architettura) as well as at the 4th triennial in Guangzhou (China). The internationally oriented triennial, which took place at the Guangdong Museum, offered Kalaizis a very large room, in order to present eight large-sized paintings. The most exceptional exhibition so far however was arranged at the palace grounds in Greiz (Schlossmuseum Greiz) and was titled, “The Double View.” In Greiz, Kalaizis confronted the historical rooms and premises with modern art. In 2014, a comprehensive museum tour through Germany, Austria and the Netherlands took place.

In 2014/15 he painted The Martyrdom of St. Bartholomew or the double Martyrdom. This large-size painting has been in the Frankfurt Cathedral since February 2015.

Influences have come to Aris in the person of his professor, during his studies, but in the most recent years, he increasingly has been inspired by the Baroque painter Jusepe de Ribera and the British artist Francis Bacon. He lives and works in Leipzig as a professional painter since 2000.

== Works ==
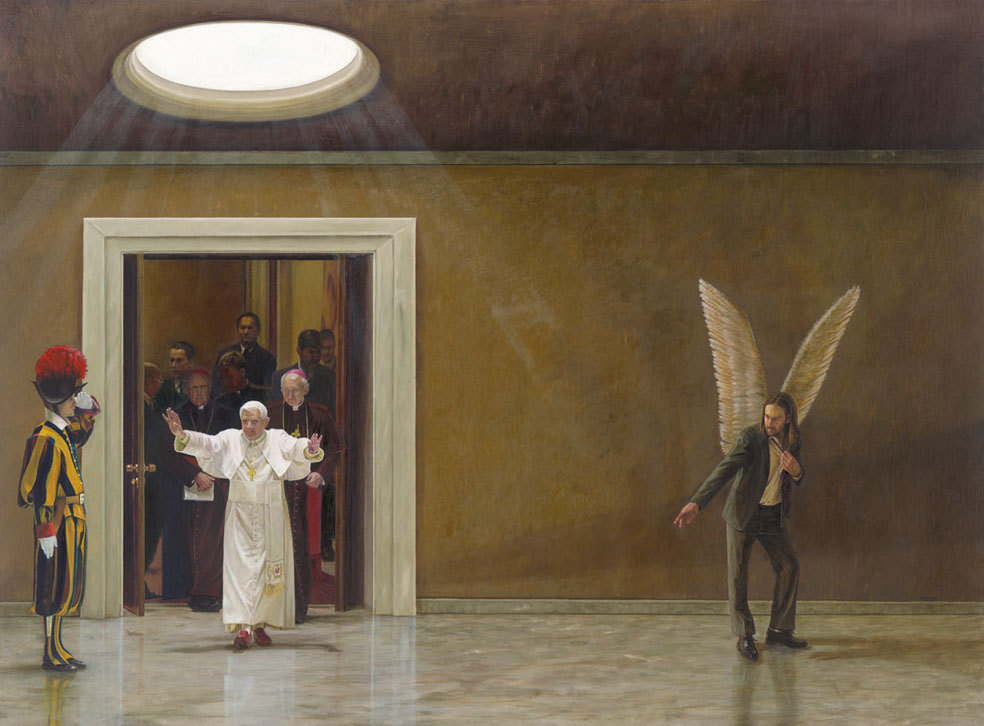
Make Believe (2009), oil on wood, 59x80cm

Kalaizis constructs his paintings, which are often elicited by dreams, with the aid of elaborate staging and by building up large scale scenes at the place of the imagined action. In this process a number of preliminary photographs are taken, from which the final painting is developed. His scenes sometimes appear to be surreal, but he unfolds their subject carefully over a long time. He writes down the ideas that will or will not surface in his paintings in form of a screenplay. The result of this uncommonly slow creative process are painted images depicting idealized prospects and possibilities of inner worlds.

At the beginning of his work however there is a dream, which evokes an inner image or inner desire. After this image has in some way been clearly envisioned, he builds a large scale model of this image in his atelier or seeks out this vision in scenes, places, or constellations in the reality of the world outside the atelier. He then searches for something (mostly a background) that is closest to his “desired background.” As soon as this has been found, he takes photos of that place. What follows, is a meditative and contemplative process that aims at scenes that could have taken place before and after the scene to be depicted. This approach distinguishes Kalaizis fundamentally from the photorealists, as they do not challenge the fringes of reality, where something new may happen.

Antithesis is the most formative structural principle in his work, whereby the painted arrangements, which are achieved in this workflow, challenge and question that which is depicted, in order to bring forth a nuanced project of renewal. This elaborate procedure of course is incredibly time-consuming, only resulting in about five paintings per year. It brings forth scenes that are parallel projects of that which exists in reality. It is a deliberate strategy that is contrary to the mass production of many contemporary artists. But because his paintings could hardly be entirely classified under surrealism or realism, the American art historian, Carol Strickland, developed the term “sottorealism,” based on Kalaizis' work. In this context, “sotto” refers to “beyond” or “below” and points to the hidden mystery that exists behind the depicted surface of the painting. Life and death, dream and reality are in a strange confluence here. Emerging out of this process, his paintings then bring forth a certain delirium, a disruption of the inner equilibrium. The paintings are often charged by a strange ferocity, in which everything takes place at the same time: magic, grace, harmony, and an unfathomable abyss. Kalaizis often mentions the surrealist André Masson in interviews and discussions, who once said: “Nothing is more fantastic than reality.”

== Awards and honors ==
- 1997 State scholarship from the German State of Saxony
- 2001 Art prize from the "Volks and Raiffeisenbank"
- 2005 USA (Columbus, OH) foreign scholarship from the Ministry of Science and Art.
- 2007 ISCP-Residency, New York City, USA
- 2016 China-scholarship, Beijing

== Monographs ==
- Of Gradual Reconciliation, catalogue, 1997 Artco-Ed., Leipzig 1997, (Germ./Engl.) ISBN 3-9805681-2-1
- Athletik und Sinnmonarchie, catalogue, 2000, maerzgalerie (Germ./Engl.)
- Brancard catalogue, 2003, maerzgalerie, (Germ./Engl.) ISBN 3-9809215-0-6
- Uncertain Pursuits, catalogue, 2005, Marburg/Leipzig /Germ./Engl.)
- Rubbacord, catalogue, 2006, Kerber-Ed., Bielefeld/Leipzig 2006, (Germ./Engl.) ISBN 3-938025-81-6
- Making Sky, monograph with catalogue raisonné 1995–2009, 2009, Hirmer-Ed., München 2009, (Germ./Engl.) ISBN 978-3-7774-9065-6
- The Double View, catalogue at the Schloßmuseum Greiz, 2011, ISBN 978-3-9814378-0-5
- The Fourth Guangzhou Triennial catalogue. Guangdong Museum of Art (China), Guangzhou, 2011 (Chin./Engl) ISBN 978-7-5362-4761-1
- Sottorealism. Large-size monograph with catalogue raisonné (1994–2014). Paul-Henri Campbell (ed.), Imhof-Ed., Petersberg, (dt./engl.) ISBN 978-3-86568-990-0

== Interviews ==
- „Europe is Dead. Long Life Europe". A political discussion about Europe, Greece and other crisis. 2016
- „There should always be doubt”„(2014), http://www.ageofartists.org/portfolio-item/always-doubt-interview-aris-kalaizis-short-version/, 22 December 2014
- „East German expressionism„(2006), https://www.csmonitor.com/2006/0929/p11s02-alar.html
- „I am not a disciple of any school". In GermanwingsMag, 2009
- „Gettersby". A Leipzig painter in NYC (2007), https://web.archive.org/web/20071208134131/http://www.hustlerofculture.com/me_we/2007/10/nyc---gettersby.html
- „My Driving Force is my Impatience". From monograph „Making Sky" (Hirmer-Ed.), 2009
- Aris Kalaizis. Skizzen zu einer nachmodernen Ästhetik. Ein Traktat. Marburger Forum, Jg. 8/2007, Heft 2
- „Aris Kalaizis in Leipzig und Berlin" (2009), https://www.welt.de/die-welt/article3831413/Maerzgalerie-zeigt-Aris-Kalaizis-in-Leipzig-und-Berlin.html
- „Der Leipziger Maler Aris Kalaizis" (2005), http://www.philosophia-online.de/mafo/heft2005-2/Aris_Kalaizis.htm
- Müssen Kunst und Kirchen Widerspruch sein. In: Tagesspiegel online, 20 September 2011
