= Leipzig (disambiguation) =

Leipzig is the most populous city in Saxony, Germany.

Leipzig may also refer to:

== Places ==
- Leipzig (Bezirk), a district of East Germany encompassing the German city
- Leipzig (district), a district near the German city
- Leipzig (region), a former subdivision of Saxony
- Leipzig, Saskatchewan, a hamlet in Canada
- Serpneve, Odesa Oblast, a village in Ukraine known as Leipzig in German and Romanian

== Ships ==
- SMS Leipzig (1875), a Leipzig-class corvette
- SMS Leipzig (1905), a Bremen-class cruiser that was sunk at the Battle of the Falkland Islands in 1914
- SMS Leipzig (1918), a Cöln-class cruiser that was cancelled before completion in 1918
- German cruiser Leipzig, a Leipzig-class cruiser during World War II

== Other uses ==
- RB Leipzig, an association football team based in Leipzig, Germany
- Battle of Leipzig, a major battle in the Napoleonic Wars
- Leipzig: The Battle of Nations, a 1972 wargame that simulates Napoleon's 1813 campaigns including the Battle of Leipzig
- Leipzig University
- Mel Leipzig (1935–2025) American painter

== See also ==
- Leipsic (disambiguation)
- Leipzig Airport (disambiguation)
- Leipzig School (disambiguation)
