= Michael Triegel =

German painter

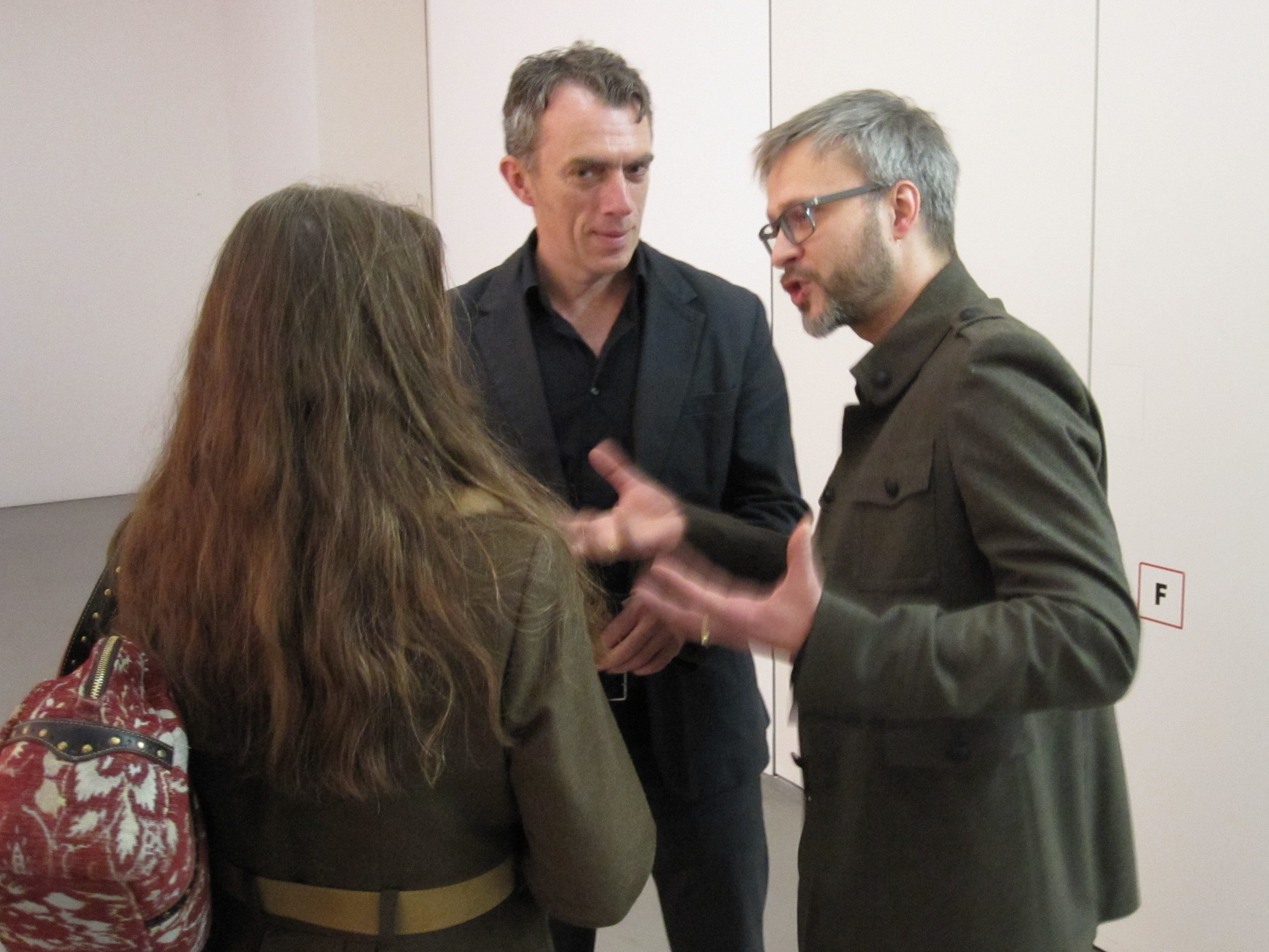
Michael Triegel (right) with Rosa Loy (left) and Neo Rauch (center)

Michael Triegel (born 13 December 1968 in Erfurt), is a German painter, illustrator and graphic artist based in Leipzig. He is associated with the New Leipzig School. He studied painting and graphic art under Arno Rink at the Hochschule für Grafik und Buchkunst Leipzig from 1990 to 1995. His paintings are highly influenced by Renaissance art.

Triegel was baptised in 2014 and paints Christian subjects. In 2010 he painted an official portrait of Pope Benedict XVI. Instead of having the pope model the conventional way, Triegel was invited to the front row during a general audience. In 2015, Die Zeit called him "Germany's most famous religious artist". Between 2020 and 2022, he worked on reconstituting a partially destroyed altarpiece by Lucas Cranach the Elder. The resulting Cranach-Triegel Altarpiece has been the center of an ongoing controversy.
