= Johannes Heisig =

German painter (born 1953)

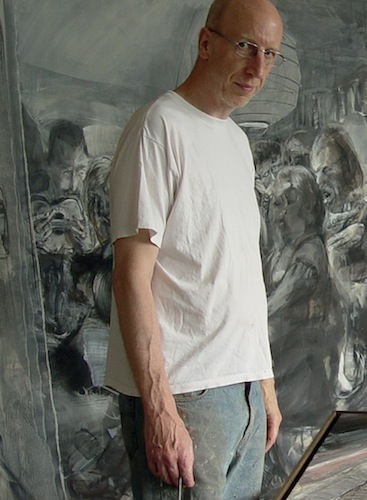
- Heisig in his studio in Berlin, 2008
- Born: April 23, 1953 (age 73); Leipzig, East Germany
- Education: Hochschule für Grafik und Buchkunst Leipzig, Hochschule für Bildende Künste Dresden
- Known for: Painting, Graphics
- Notable work: work series "es war einmal" (once upon a time), several portraits, murals, Crow
- Website: "es war einmal" and others

Johannes Heisig (born 23 April 1953 in Leipzig, East Germany) is a German painter and graphic artist. His work combines the tradition of German socialist realism with a subjective expressionism. He portrayed several famous German politicians such as Willy Brandt, Johannes Rau and former Finance Minister Peer Steinbrück. The artist is represented by galerie son, Berlin.

== Life ==
Heisig comes from a family of artists. His father Bernhard Heisig was the principal of the Old Leipzig School and the teacher of many artists from the "New Leipzig School" (i.e. Neo Rauch).

In his father's studio Johannes learned early from his childhood on the art of painting. From 1973 to 1977 he studied Painting and Graphics at the Hochschule für Grafik und Buchkunst Leipzig and from 1978 to 1980 he was Masterstudent with Professor Gerhard Kettner at the Hochschule für Bildende Künste Dresden (HfBK) where he was the president from 1989 to 1991. After his withdrawing from his long-time teaching activity there he went from Dresden to Berlin. He was invited to several residency programs at International Universities and worked as a Professor at the Dortmund University (2003–2004).

== Work ==
Johannes Heisig is known for his graphics and illustrations and his portraits for which he can also be considered a modern court painter.

In 2008 he presented his large works series "es war einmal" (once upon a time) which shows the topic of German separation both from a private and a public view in colored portraits and large black-and-white canvasses with scenes from both West and East. These artworks were presented to the public for the first time in the Berlin House of Representatives in 2008 and then in the German Embassy London.

One of Heisig's favorite subjects is Music. He created several painting and lithograph series inspired by or referring to international musicians like Van Morrison, Tom Waits and Johann Sebastian Bach. His large triptych "Be Berlin or: The Unifying Power of Music" shows musicians playing beside John F. Kennedy on his Berlin visit in the 1960s sitting in a car together with Willy Brandt and Konrad Adenauer.

From 2010 to 2011 Heisig created his work series 'CROW' referring to the same-titled poems by Ted Hughes.

== Exhibitions ==
- 2012: "augenscheinlich", Solo exhibition in the Kunstverein Coburg, Coburg
- 2011: "ÜBERGÄNGE | CROSSINGS", Willy-Brandt-Haus / galerie son / SEZ, Berlin
- 2009: “20 Jahre Deutsche Einheit”, Kunsthalle, Schweinfurt
- 2008: "3 berliner", German Embassy, London
- 2008: "es war einmal", Berlin House of Representatives
- 1990-1994: "New Territory - Art from East Germany", School of the Museum of Fine Arts, Boston / The Art Gallery of the University of Maryland, College Park / Edwin A. Ulrich Museum of Art, Wichita State University, Kansas / LEHIGH ART GALLERIES (Hall and Wilson Gallery) Lehigh University Bethlehem, Pennsylvania / and others, USA
- 1992: “TURNING POINTS: EAST GERMAN ART IN REVOLUTION", Sunderland, Carlisle and others, Great Britain
- 1992: "To Those Who Begin Again-Art of East Germany", Art Gallery (Williams Centre for the Arts) of the Lafayette College, Easton, PA /USA
- 1989: "The Art of Young Painters of the 1980s from the GDR", Solothurn/Switzerland
- 1989: "Signs of the Times-Paintings and Graphics from the GDR", Tokyo-Nagano- Kumamoto-Kamakura-Kobe/Japan
- 1988: "Contemporary Painting of the GDR", Peking, Taiyuan /China
- 1986: VI. Triennale of India, Lalit Kala Akademi, New Delhi /India
- 1982: XII. Biennale de Paris, Paris /France

== Publications ==
- "Johannes Heisig - es war einmal", galerie son, Mihyun Son, Berlin, 2008
