= Arno Rink =

German painter

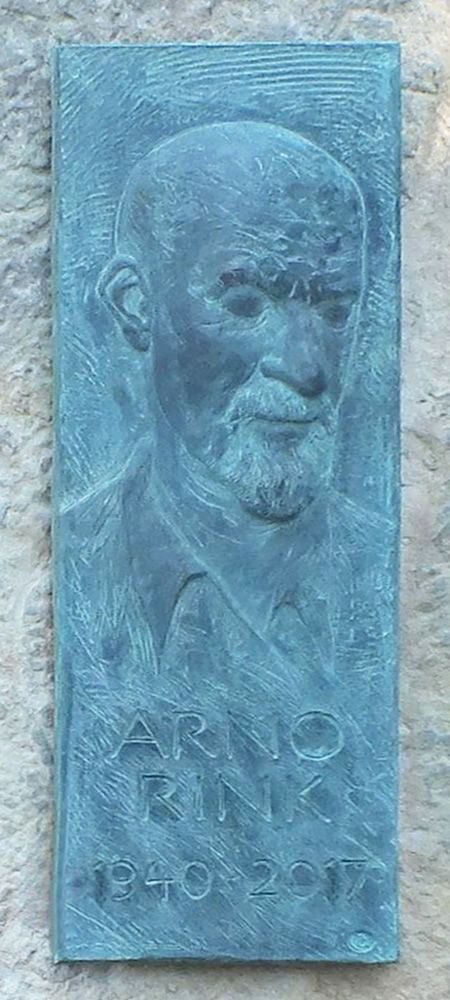
Arno Rink

Arno Rink (26 September 1940 – 5 September 2017) was a German painter. He was accepted to the Hochschule für Grafik und Buchkunst Leipzig (HGB) in 1962 and studied under Werner Tübke, Hans Mayer-Foreyt and Harry Blume. He is associated with the second generation of the Leipzig School, which paints in a German figurative tradition.

Rink started to teach at the HGB in 1979 and was its headmaster from 1987 to 1995. He taught several prominent painters from the New Leipzig School, such as Neo Rauch, Tilo Baumgärtel, Michael Triegel, Tim Eitel, David Schnell and Christoph Ruckhäberle.
