= Heisig =

Heisig is a German surname. Notable people with the surname include:

- James Heisig (born 1944), American philosopher
- Johannes Heisig (born 1953), German artist
- Mary Heisig (1913–1966), American artist

== See also ==
- Walther Heissig (1913–2005), Austrian Mongolist
