= Gottfried Goebel =

Austrian painter (1906–1975)

Gottfried Goebel (5 November 1906 – 12 October 1975) was an Austrian painter and graphic designer who lived in France. He studied at the Academy of Fine Arts Vienna under Rudolf Jettmar. In 1936, he and his partner Greta Freist moved to Paris, where they started the French section of the International Art Club in 1950. One of his notable works include Premonition of the War (1939), which has been called "a direct precursor of Neo Rauch and the Leipzig School". In 1939, he was interned by the French government, and was arrested by the Gestapo in 1944. After the war, he was heavily engaged with the works of Picasso. Around 1948, he started producing abstract art, including the Fond Blanc series, and went on to work on geometric art and Tachist painting. In the 1960s, he experimented with fabric painting, as seen in the series Peint. en Relief (from 1957) and Tubes (from 1960), which led to his interest in sculpture using new materials.
