= Cranach-Triegel Altarpiece =

Painting by Lucas Cranach the Elder and Michael Triegel

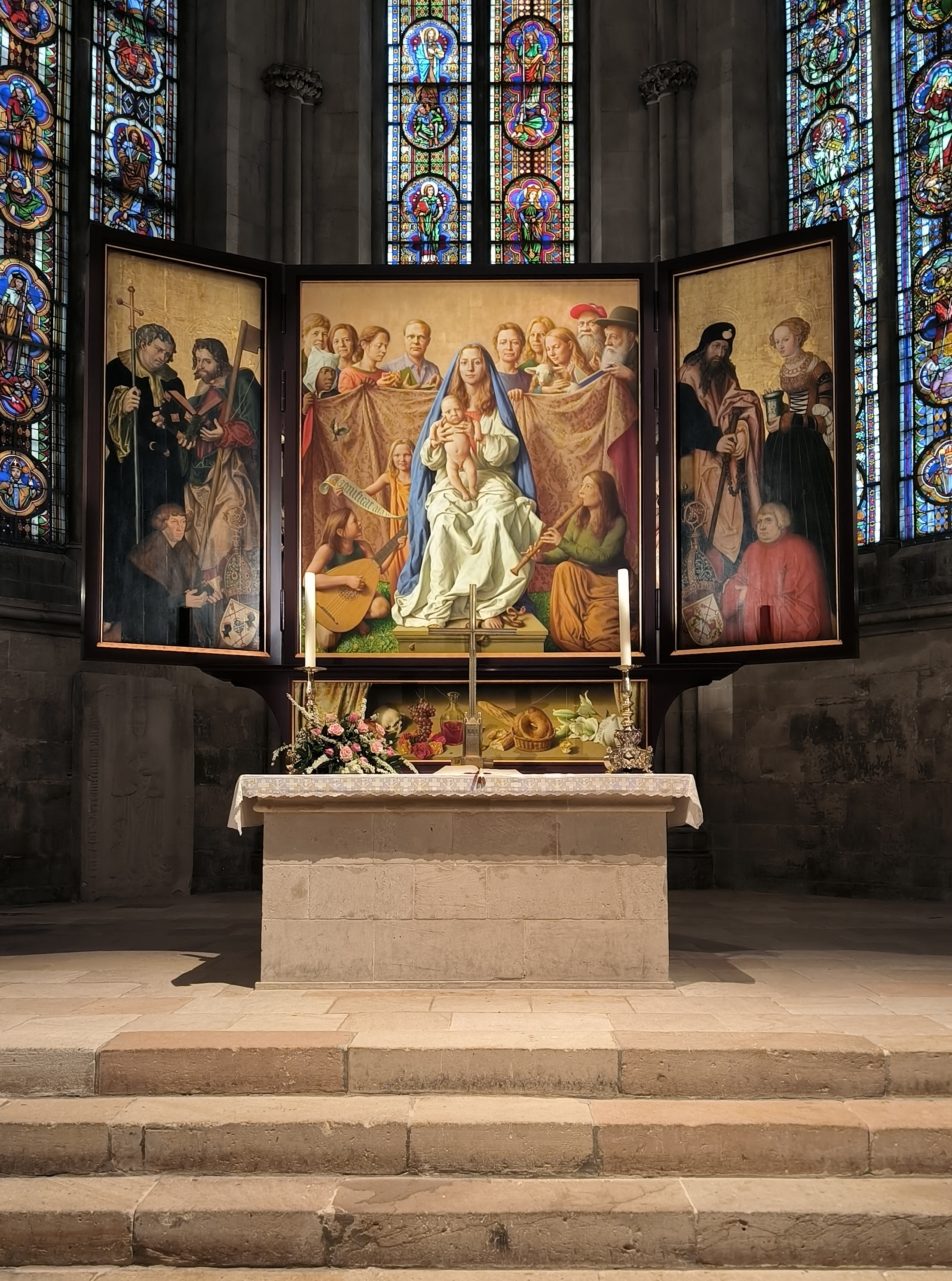
- Artist: Lucas Cranach the Elder and Michael Triegel
- Year: 1519 and 2022
- Medium: Oil and gold on panel
- Movement: German Renaissance
- Location: Vatican
- Owner: Naumburger Domherrern

The Cranach-Triegel Altarpiece is a winged altarpiece originally created as a retable for the western altar of the Naumburg Cathedral. The first version was painted by Lucas Cranach the Elder in 1519, but its central panel was destroyed in 1541. The altarpiece was reconstituted in 2022 by Michael Triegel. Since then, it has been the cause of an ongoing controversy and, as of 2026, it is housed at the Vatican.

== History and description ==
=== Cranach ===
The original altarpiece by Lucas Cranach was produced between 1517 and 1519 in his Wittenberg atelier. This work was part of a large scale renovation of the western choir as a sepulchre for the recently deceased bishop John III of Schönberg. In 1519, it was consecrated and placed on the altar in the western choir of the Naumburg Cathedral.

The compository details of the original central panel by Cranach are unknown, although research indicates it to have depicted the Virgin Mary. Like the surviving side panels, the whole triptych was probably painted with oil and gold on wood. The right panel depicts James the Great and Mary Magdalene with donor Philip of the Palatinate on the front and St. Barbara on the back. The left panel shows Philip the Apostle and James the Less with donor John III of Schönberg on the front und St. Catherine on the back.

Cranach's altarpiece would, however, only remain in the western choir for 22 years. On September 11, 1541, the Protestant superintendent Nikolaus Medler forcefully acquired access to the Naumburg Cathedral. He was authorized by the Saxon prince-elector Johann Friedrich I. to remove depictions of Mary used for worship. As a result, the central panel of the triptych, containg a depiction of the Virgin Mary, was destroyed. Afterward, the surviving side panels were displayed in the eastern choir and eventually put in storage.

=== Triegel ===
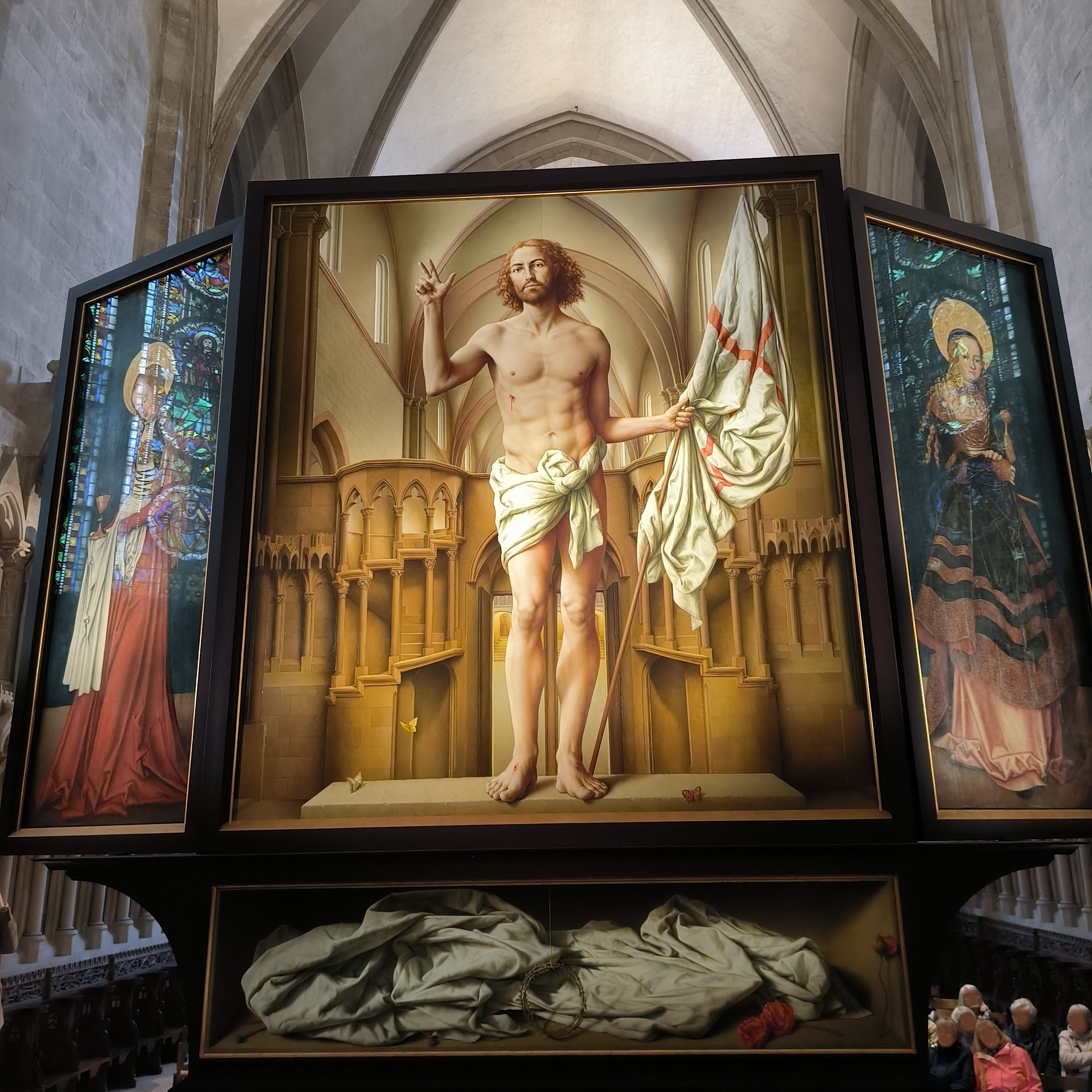
Backside of the Cranach-Triegel Altarpiece

In 2019, the Leipzig-based painter Micheal Triegel was commissioned with reconstituting the triptych. Between 2020 and 2022, he produced the missing center panel as well as a predella in his atelier at the Leipziger Baumwollspinnerei. The newly painted center panel is painted with oil and gold on fibreboard. The front side is composed as a sacra conversazione, meaning that the madonna is surrounded by a group of saints. They are St. Peter and St. Paul, after whom the Naumburg Cathedral is named, as well as St. Elisabeth and St. Anne. It also shows Dietrich Bonhoeffer, a Protestant theologian and martyr, as well as several unnamed figures. A child-like figure holds a scroll of the Song of Mary. The backside of the center panel shows the risen Christ as Saviour of the World. The predella shows imagery associated with the eucharist on the front and the empty grave of Jesus at the back.

=== Cranach-Triegel ===
The combined Cranach-Triegel Altarpiece was consecrated on July 2, 2022, in an ecumenical mass celebrated by both the Lutheran and Roman Catholic bishop. Due to an ongoing controversy (see below), it was removed from the western choir in December 2022. It went on an exhibition tour until being placed again at the Naumburg Cathedral in December 2023. While it was displayed there, it was seen by 73,000 visitors. In November 2025, it was removed again and is currently housed at the Santa Maria church at Campo Teutonico at the Vatican.

== Interpretation ==
The original Cranach Altarpiece was conceived as part of the construction of the sepulchre of the recently deceased bishop John III of Schönberg. It consequently contains him as well as his successor Philip of the Palatinate as donors. The depictions of several saints are interpreted as replacements for the side altars, which had been removed during the rebuilding of the western choir in 1519. It is assumed that the central panel depicted the Virgin Mary, as the preserved central altar was dedicated to her and had previously featured an image of her.

The reconstitution of the altarpiece was perceived as an ecumencial project and both the Lutheran and Roman Catholic bishop were involved from early on. Micheal Triegel was chosen for this work due to his mastery of Renaissance painting and frequent use of religious themes in his work. Triegel wanted to convey the human nature of the saints and, therefore, used common people as models. For the Virgin Mary and St. Anne, he used his own daughter and wife. St. Paul is portrayed by a Jewish Rabbi, whereas St. Peter is portrayed by a homeless person he met in 2018 at St. Peter's Square. Only Bonhoeffer is depicted as himself.

== Popular reception ==
The reconstitution of the Cranach-Triegel Altarpiece led to a substantial discussion in the German Feuilleton. In particular the perceived conflict between a living tradition and the preservation of cultural sites were discussed (see below). The international organisation Future for Religious Heritage declared the altarpiece as the Religious Heritage Innovator of the Year 2023 and praised in particular the Organisation der Vereinigten Naumburger Domstifter (supervisory body of the Naumburg Cathedral).

=== Controversy ===
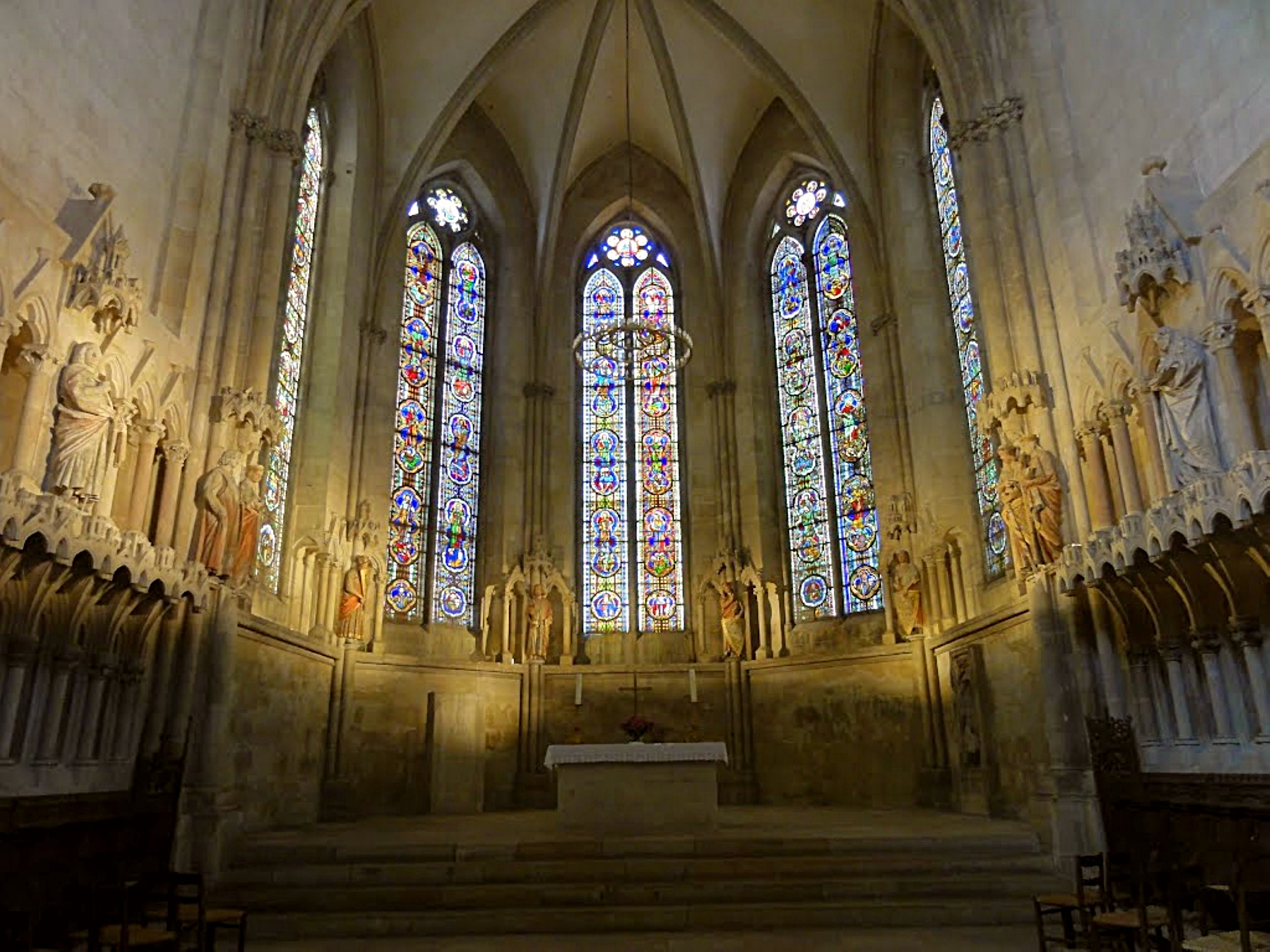
Western choir of the Naumburg Chathedral with the Stifterfiguren (donor figures) being arranged around the currently empty altar

The placement of the altar at the western choir of the Naumburg Cathedral has been the cause of an ongoing controversy. This is due to a perceived conflict with the 13th century arrangement of the place as created by the Naumburg Master. Central to this arrangement are twelve Stifterfiguren (donor figures), which are placed around the altar. They are widely seen as a seminal achievement of the High Gothic style and were declared a World heritage site by the UNESCO in 2018.

Opposition to the placement of the altarpiece in the center of these figures was voiced by the International Council on Monuments and Sites (ICOMOS), which advises the UNESCO on World Heritage sites. According to their criticism, the substantial height of the altarpiece would obstruct several of the donor figures and result in a severe disruption of the ensemble. Moreover, experts from ICOMOS questioned the original placement of the altarpiece in the western choir as well as whether its central panel contained the Virgin Mary in the first place. As a result, ICOMOS declared that the Cranach-Triegel Altarpiece would endanger the status of the site as a World heritage.

The supervisory body of the Naumburg Cathedral reacted to this criticism by temporarily removing the altarpiece in 2022 and sending it on a tour to a number of exhibitions, in order to "calm the discussion". The first station of this tour was the Diözesanmuseum Paderborn. During this time, the criticism by ICOMOS was countered from an historic, artistic and religious perspective.

First, a re-analysis of historical documents in the archives substantiated both the placement of the original Cranach altarpiece in the western choir as well as its partial destruction in 1541. This is important since the Venice Charter explicitly encourages the preservation of art, which was specifically created for a particular site. Moreover, from an artistic perspective it has been argued that the altarpiece does not disturb the ensemble of the donor figures but instead completes it. Since the gaze of the figures is directed toward the space above the altar, they would be looking into nothing without an altarpiece on it. Finally from a religious perspective, it has been argued that a consecrated altarpiece cannot simply be removed from its altar and that ICOMOS' decision constitutes an unacceptable interference in the religious autonomy of the faithful. To accommodate the perceived visual obstruction of the donor figures, the supervisory body offered to keep the altarpiece closed for much of the church year, thus, allowing an unobstructed view.

Despite these counterpoints and the proposed compromise, ICOMOS eventually renewed its criticisms of the altarpiece in a 2025 report. According to their verdict, a permanent placement of the altarpiece would pose a significant impairment of the Gothic ensemble and endanger the World heritage status of the site. To prevent the loss of this status, the supervisory body of the Naumburg Cathedral removed the altarpiece in November 2025 for a second time.

=== Burkhard Scheffler ===
Burkhard Scheffler was a German beggar, who, since 2010, had lived under the colonnades of St. Peter's Square. He froze to death in November 2022 and Pope Francis subsequently mentioned him during his Angelus prayer the following Sunday, as well as his Palm Sunday homily in April 2023. Francis also organized his burial in June 2023 at the Campo Teutonico. Having been baptized as a Lutheran, Scheffler became the first Protestant on the Catholic cemetery.

When in November 2025 the Cranach-Triegel Altarpiece was removed from the Naumburg Cathedral and put on display in the Santa Maria church at the Campo Teutonico, people recognized Scheffler in the picture. Unbeknownst to Triegel, he was the homeless person he had portrayed in 2018 and later used as the image of St. Peter. Commentators, therefore, noticed shared themes between the picture and Scheffler's burial like the ecumenical aspect and Scheffler's connection to St. Peter, by both portraying him and being buried next to his resting place.
