= Ulf Puder =

German painter (born 1958)

Ulf Puder, born 1958 in Leipzig, is a German painter. He is educated at the Hochschule für Grafik und Buchkunst Leipzig and is associated with the New Leipzig School. His paintings contain semi-abstract architectural and geometrical shapes, often in pastel colours and subdued colours, with a sense of melancholy and decay.

He lives and works in Leipzig and Liemehna, Germany. He is represented by Galerie Jochen Hempel in Germany and Marc Straus in the United States.
