= Michael Hametner =

German-Austrian journalist, editor and writer

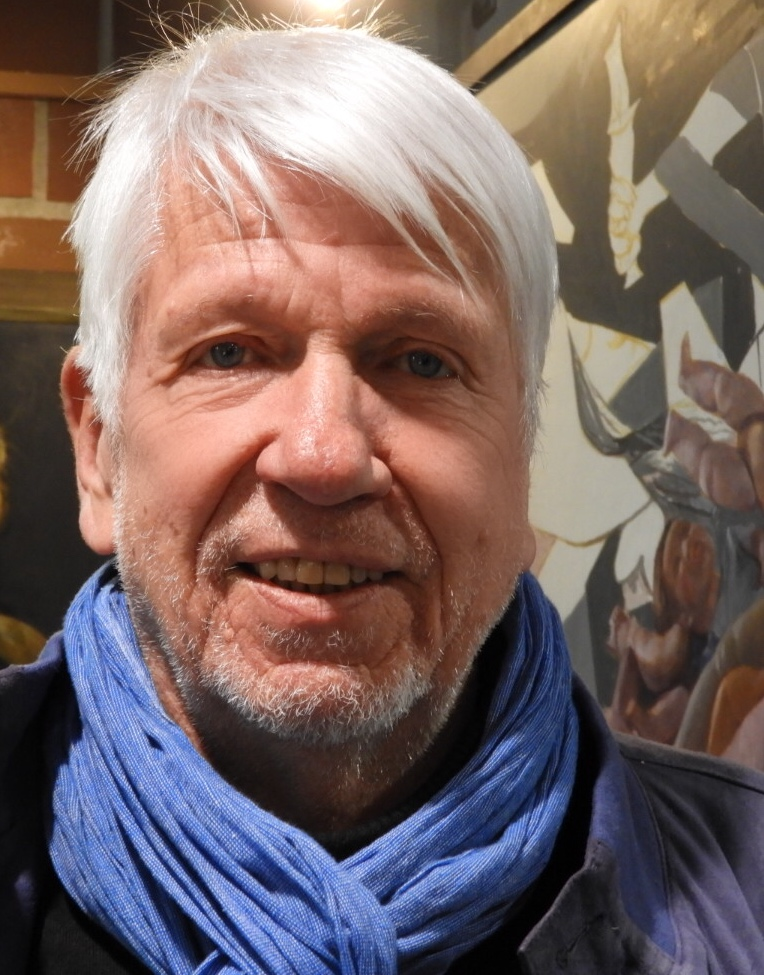
Michael Hametner (2019)

Michael Hametner (born 1950 at Rostock) is a German–Austrian journalist, editor, writer and literary and theater critic

== Life ==
Hametner, son of an Austrian citizen, studied journalism and literary studies at the University of Leipzig. Initially working as an actor and director he became leading the "Poetische Theater" at the University of Leipzig; where he played and directed Der Auftrag by Heiner Müller (as "Debuisson"), Kohlhaas, Stefan Schütz' version of Kleists novel (as "Luther"), Stephan Hermlins Scardanelli (Premiere), Edward Albees Die Zoogeschichte (first performance in East Germany), Alexander Vampilovs Provinzanekdoten and Samuel Beckett's Waiting for Godot (as Pozzo). As director, he also played in important role in the debut performance of Astoria by Austrian writer Jura Soyfer in East Germany (together with Bernhard Scheller).

From the beginning of the 1990s Hametner had been working as a freelancer at Mitteldeutscher Rundfunk (MDR). In 1993 he was appointed jury member for "Hörspiel des Monats" ("Radio drama of the month"). Before he just headed the East German radio drama critics jury and later he became a member of the jury for Gellert Prize, Hörspielpreis der Kriegsblinden (radio drama prize of the blind war victims) and Leipzig Book Award for European Understanding (2007–2009). Since 2007 Hametner is also member of the jury for the Uwe Johnson Prize. In 1994 he became editorial journalist and presenter for literature at Mitteldeutscher Rundfunk, where he established the MDR-Literaturpreis (MDR literature prize) in 1995.

Hametner published several books containing one-on-one interviews with German painters and actors like Bernhard Heisig, Johannes Heisig, Sighard Gille and Fred Delmare.

Hametner has also been working as a narrator for audio recordings since 2005. Until 2015 he had been editorial journalist for literature. Since 2008 he is member of Bührnheim's Literature Salon.

Hametner lives in Leipzig.

== Works (selection) ==
Author

- Kleine Form des Theaters. Zentralhaus-Publikation, Leipzig 1986.
- Neue und wiederentdeckte Gegenwarts-Dramatik aus der DDR. Zentralhaus-Publikation, Leipzig 1989, ISBN 978-3-7444-0142-5.
- Kleine Leute. Das Leben des Schauspielers Fred Delmare. Schwarzkopf und Schwarzkopf, Berlin 1997, ISBN 978-3-89602-122-9.
- Einkreisen. 15 Gespräche – ein Porträt des Malers Sighard Gille. Mitteldeutscher Verlag, Halle 2014, ISBN 978-3-95462-226-9.
- Auf der Bühne. 15 Gespräche – ein Porträt des Malers Matthias Weischer. Mitteldeutscher Verlag, Halle 2016, ISBN 978-3-95462-643-4.
- Übermalen. 15 Gespräche – ein Porträt des Malers Johannes Heisig. Mitteldeutscher Verlag, Halle 2017, ISBN 978-3-95462-811-7.
- Bernhard Heisig und Gudrun Brüne. Ein Künstlerpaar über fünfzig Jahre. Mitteldeutscher Verlag, Halle (Saale) 2018, ISBN 978-3-95462-993-0.
- Gert Pötzschig – Valeurs. Sax, Beucha/Markkleeberg 2018, ISBN 978-3-86729-223-8.
- Kopfkino. 15 Gespräche – ein Porträt des Malers Hans Aichinger. Mitteldeutscher Verlag, Halle (Saale) 2019, ISBN 978-3-96311-218-8

Publisher

- Zornesrot. Anthologie junger Autoren. Mitteldeutscher Verlag, Halle 2007, ISBN 978-3-89812-440-9.
- Zeit der Witze. Texte junger Autoren. Mitteldeutscher Verlag, Halle 2009, ISBN 978-3-89812-601-4.
- Wolfgang Heger: Lichtzeichen. Ein Porträt des Malers Rolf-Gunter Dienst im Dialog. Mitteldeutscher Verlag, Halle 2015, ISBN 978-3-95462-460-7.

Audiobook narrator

At Universal Music, Berlin:

- Wahnsinn Fußball! Bundesliga-Geschichten aus vier Jahrzehnten. 2005, ISBN 978-3-8291-1592-6.
- Pferde sind meine Freunde. Der richtige Umgang mit Pferden. 2005, ISBN 978-3-8291-1584-1.
- Hunde richtig kennen und verstehen. So wird Ihr Hund zum besten Freund. 2005, ISBN 978-3-8291-1582-7.

At Universal Family Entertainment, Berlin:

- Fritz Hennenberg: Wolfgang Amadeus Mozart. 2006, ISBN 978-3-8291-1642-8.
- Alan Posener: William Shakespeare. 2006, ISBN 978-3-8291-1758-6.
- Klaus Schröter: Thomas Mann. 2006, ISBN 978-3-8291-1646-6.
- Barbara Meier: Robert Schumann. 2006, ISBN 978-3-8291-1643-5.
- Peter Boerner: Johann Wolfgang von Goethe. 2006, ISBN 978-3-8291-1645-9.
- Christian Liedtke: Heinrich Heine. 2006, ISBN 978-3-8291-1647-3.
- Wolfgang Emmerich: Gottfried Benn. 2006, ISBN 978-3-8291-1741-8.
- Heimo Rau: Gandhi. 2006, ISBN 978-3-8291-1639-8.
- Hans Wißkirchen: Die Familie Mann. 2006, ISBN 978-3-8291-1745-6.
- Stefana Sabin: Andy Warhol. 2006, ISBN 978-3-8291-1641-1.
- Claudia Pilling, Diana Schilling, Mirjam Springer: Friedrich Schiller. 2007, ISBN 978-3-8291-1742-5.
- Frank Niess: Che Guevara. 2007, ISBN 978-3-8291-1756-2.
