= David Schnell =

German painter (born 1971)

- Born: 1971 (age 54–55); Bergisch Gladbach, Germany
- Education: Hochschule für Grafik und Buchkunst
- Movement: Leipzig school

David Schnell (born 1971, Bergisch Gladbach, Germany) is an internationally exhibited German painter. From 1995 until 2000 he studied painting at the Hochschule für Grafik und Buchkunst in Leipzig and then from 2000 to 2002 he was a student in the master class of Arno Rink, with whom Neo Rauch had previously studied. He is associated with the New Leipzig School.

In 2010 Schnell had a solo exhibition at the Stunde Kunstverein in Hannover which then traveled to the Gemeentemuseum in The Hague and the Museum zu Allerheiligen Schaffhausen. Schnell is considered to be a younger contemporary of the East German painter, Neo Rauch and a member of the so-called Leipziger Schule (Leipzig school). 2009 he was commissioned to design the "Friedensfenster" (peace window) at St. Thomas Church, Leipzig. In 2013 Schnell was a recipient Villa Massimo grant. In 2016 he was commissioned to design a church window for the Christuskirche in Cologne.
