= Sottorealism =

Approach in contemporary aesthetics

The term Sottorealism (sotto Italian for “beneath” or “under” and the Latin realis “concerning the thing;” res “thing, object”) describes an approach in contemporary aesthetics. It has been developed concerning painting, but also applies to photography

== History ==
The American art historian Carol Strickland (born 1946) coined the term Sottorealism in an essay titled “Detour as a Route to Unity and Order” (2006). In the essay, she was concerned with the artwork of the German-Greek painter Aris Kalaizis. While approaching his work, Strickland discovered a hermeneutical void between realism and surrealism, which she filled with neologism.

== Concept ==
Instead of painting a surreal universe, the Sottorealist is interested in crawling beneath the surface of reality. While the world of the dream isn't a creative act, and while no photographic device is able to fully mediate that which is beyond reality, the Sottorealist acknowledges that which is given in reality. In doing so, the Sottorealist, however, also acknowledges that unseen forces are active in our perception of reality, such as memory or cultural frameworks or metaphysical. By making these numinous realities present in his work, he creates a convergence of the seen and unseen.

The idea is to go beyond the appearance of things and to uncover substructures that are beyond the empirical reality. Sottorealists approach these second or third orders of reality by constructing elaborate models. These models could be viewed as experiments that are necessary to sound out the full scope of that which is part of reality, even though it is not an apparent and visible part of it.

== Process ==
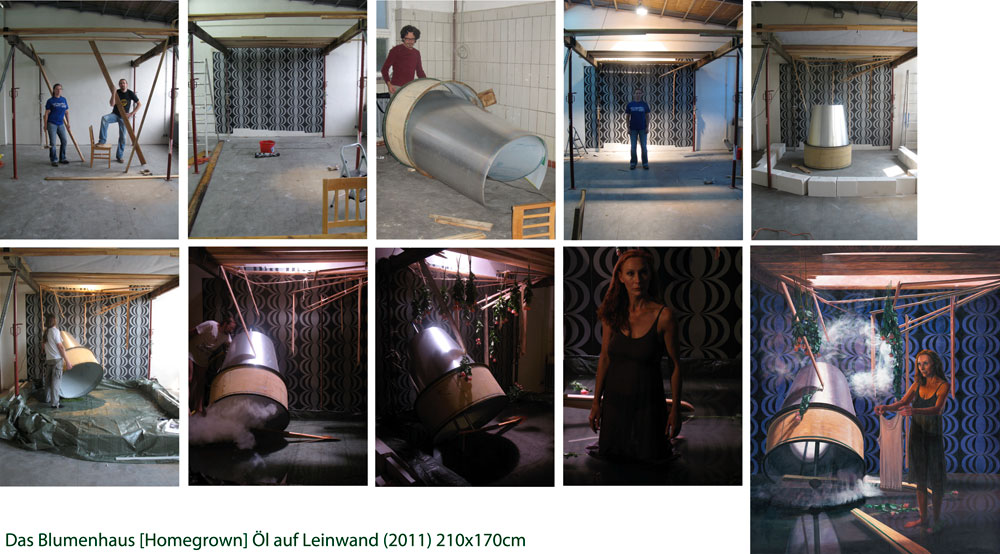
Model for the painting „Homegrown“ by Aris Kalaizis (2011). The actress Andrea Sawatzki at the set.

Building models of that which are to be painted is an essential part of the process. These models can be erected in public spaces or an atelier. They offer an opportunity to probe that which the artist feels to have unearthed from beneath the surface of reality. These models can also range in complexity, be very elaborate or very simple. Photographic images taken while this model is set up, aid the artist during the final realization of the painting. Aris Kalaizis was the first painter who made use of this concept when preparing his paintings.

== Proponents ==
Prominent Sottorealists are the Canadian photographer Jeff Wall, the Finnish photographer Ilkka Halso, as well as the American Gregory Crewdson.

== Literature ==
- Carol Strickland, Detour as a Route to Unity and Order, in: Rubbacord, Bielefeld 2006 S. 9–13.
- Paul-Henri Campbell (ed.), Sottorealism, Petersberg 2013.
