= Rosa Loy =

German Illustrator and painter

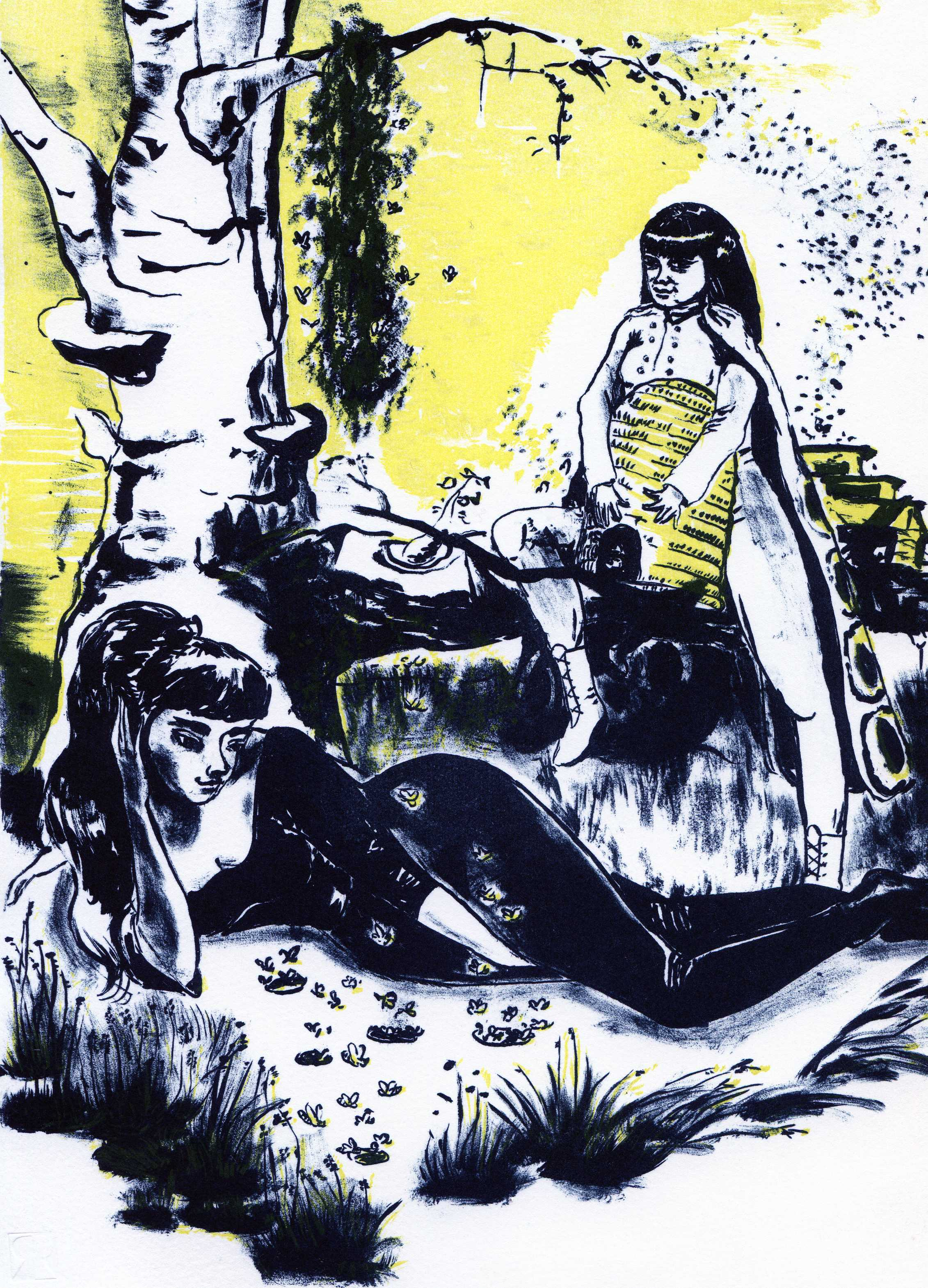
Rosa Loy - Blätterrauschen (Rust of Leaves), Lithography, "At the centre of her paintings is always the figure of the female double and the doppelgänger."

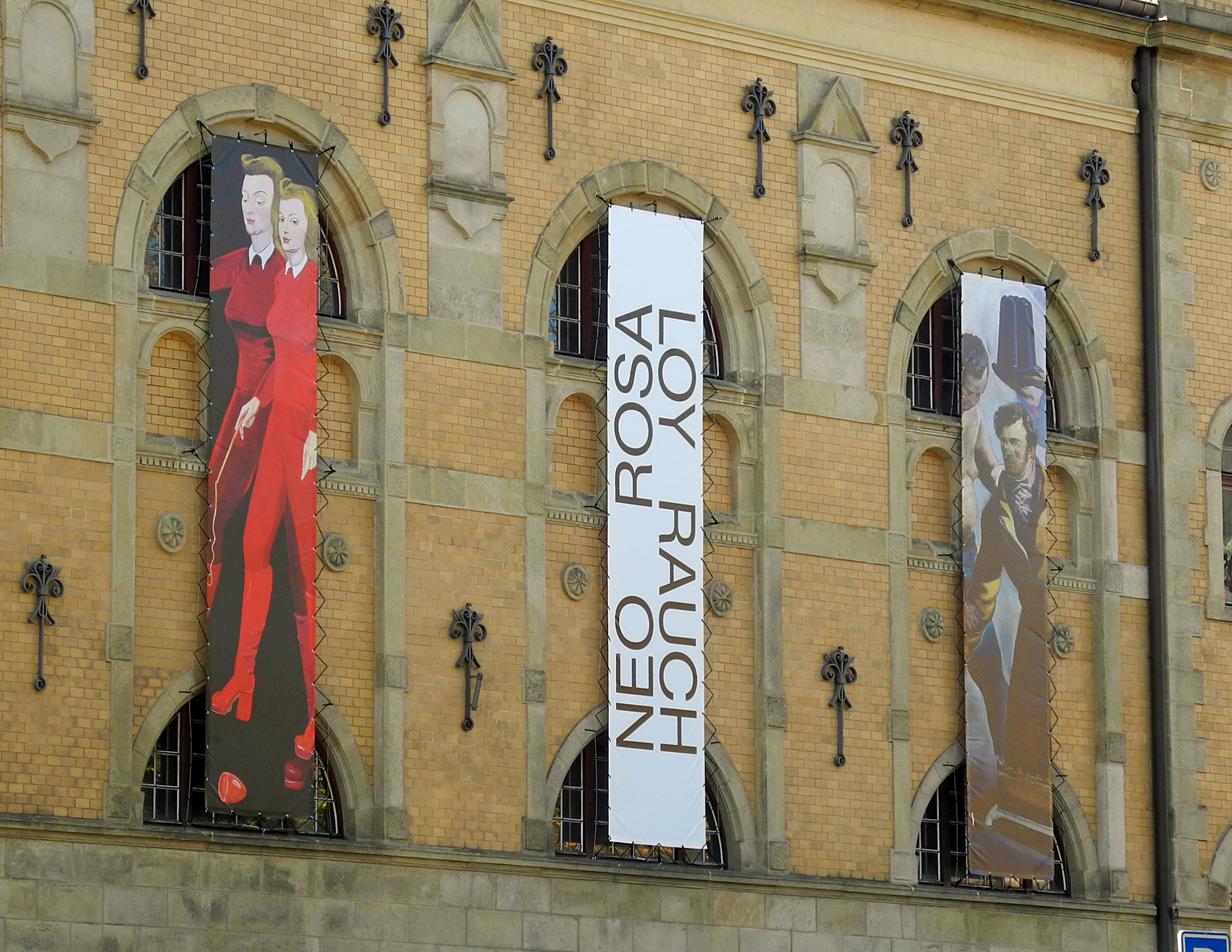
Exhibition in Liberec, Czech Republic (2024), together with Neo Rauch

Rosa Loy (born 1958) is a German Illustrator and painter. She belongs to the "New Leipzig School".

== Biography ==
Rosa Loy was born in 1958 in Zwickau. She graduated in horticulture from the Humboldt University of Berlin in 1981 and worked in this field until 1985. She then moved to Leipzig to study illustration at the Hochschule für Grafik und Buchkunst with Rolf Felix Müller, graduating in 1990. In 1993, she obtained a master's degree in painting and illustration with Rolf Münzner. Since 1993, she has been working independently.

Rosa Loy lives with her husband and artist Neo Rauch in Markkleeberg near Leipzig and was one of the first artists in the Baumwollspinnerei, a former cotton mill in Leipzig.

Neo Rauch and Rosa Loy designed the scenic design for Richard Wagner's opera Lohengrin at the Bayreuth Festival in 2018, 2019, 2020, 2022 and 2025.

== Loy's work in permanent collections of museums ==
Loy's work is included in the permanent collections of the Museum of Contemporary Art, Los Angeles, United States; Museum of Modern Art, New York, United States; Art Institute of Chicago, Chicago, United States; Pérez Art Museum, Miami, United States; Busan Museum of Art, Busan, South Korea] Art and Museum Centre Sinkka, Kerava, Finland; and Museum der bildenden Künste, Leipzig, Germany, among others.

== Bibliography ==
- Rosa Loy. Manna (in English and German). Hantje Cantz. 2011. ISBN 978-3-7757-2762-4.
