= The Vincent Award =

European art prize

The Vincent Award was a Dutch prize awarded to a European artist whose works were deemed highly relevant in contemporary art. The award was awarded every two years in the Netherlands from the year 2000 to 2014. Five artists were nominated, and their work was exhibited at the Stedelijk Museum in Amsterdam. The winner received €50,000. The Vincent award, named for Dutch artist Vincent van Gogh, was aimed at stimulating European artists and building a discussion platform within Europe. The award was suspended in 2016.

== History ==
The Vincent Award was established in 2000 by the Broere Charitable Foundation in memory of Monique Zajfen, a friend of the Broere family and holder of the Gallery 121 in Antwerp. The art collection of Monique Zajfen constituted of the works by The Vincent Award winners and other contemporary artists. Zaifen's collection was given to the Stedelijk Museum of Amsterdam on long-term loan.

The award first took place at the Bonnefanten Museum in Maastricht. From 2006, The Vincent Award was hosted by the Stedelijk Museum in Amsterdam. The winner was decided by six jury members headed by the director of the Stedelijk Museum. The jury consisted of professionals in the sphere of the European Arts.

=== The Jury of The Vincent Award 2008 ===
1. Manuel Borja-Villel (director of MACBA, Barcelona)
2. Ian Dunlop (art historian, London)
3. Ingvild Goetz (Sammlung Goetz, Munich)
4. Viktor Misiano (critic and curator, Moscow)
5. Beatrix Ruf (director of Kunsthalle, Zurich)
6. Gijs van Tuyl (director of Stedelijk Museum, Amsterdam)

== Winners ==
1. 2016 - no winner
2. 2014 - Anri Sala
3. 2008 - Deimantas Narkevicius, Francis Alÿs
4. 2006 - Wilhelm Sasnal
5. 2004 - Paweł Althamer
6. 2002 - Neo Rauch
7. 2000 - Eija-Liisa Ahtila

== See also ==
- List of European art awards
