= Leipzig School =

Leipzig School may refer to:

- Neogrammarian
- Leipzig school (sociology)
- Leipzig School (translation), translation and interpreting studies
- Leipzig School (painting)
  - New Leipzig School, its descendant
