= Neo Rauch: Comrades and Companions =

German documentary

Neo Rauch – Gefährten und Begleiter
- Directed by: Nicola Graef
- Written by: Nicola Graef
- Produced by: Susanne Brand; Nicola Graef
- Cinematography: Felix Greif; Alexander Rott
- Edited by: Kai Minierski
- Music by: George Kochbeck; Lukas Kochbeck
- Production company: Lona.media Filmproduktion
- Distributed by: Weltkino Filmverleih
- Release dates: 2 November 2016 (Dok Leipzig); 2 March 2017
- Running time: 105 minutes
- Country: Germany
- Language: German

Neo Rauch - Comrades and Companions (Original title: Neo Rauch – Gefährten und Begleiter) is a 2016 German documentary film directed by Nicola Graef, about the painter Neo Rauch. The filmmaker followed Rauch for three years in his studio in Leipzig and at exhibitions in America, Asia and Europe.

== Release ==
The film had its world premier on 2 November 2016 at Dok Leipzig. It was released in regular German cinemas on 2 March 2017.

== See also ==
- New Leipzig School
