= Eija-Liisa Ahtila =

Finnish artist and photographer (born 1959)

- Born: 1959 (age 66–67); Hämeenlinna, Finland
- Education: UCLA, American Film Institute, London College of Printing, University of Helsinki
- Known for: Video art, Installation art
- Website: eija-liisaahtila.com

Eija-Liisa Ahtila (born 1959 in Hämeenlinna, Finland) is a contemporary visual artist and filmmaker who lives and works in Helsinki.

Ahtila is most known for her multi-panel cinematic installations. She experiments with narrative storytelling in her films and cinematic installations. In her earlier works, she dealt with the topic of unsettling human dramas at the center of personal relationships, dealing with teenage sexuality, family relationships, mental disintegration, and death. Her later works, however, pursue more profound artistic questions where she investigates the processes of perception and attribution of meaning, at times in the light of larger cultural and existential themes, like colonialism, faith and posthumanism.

Ahtila has participated in numerous international art exhibitions such as Manifesta (1998), the Venice Biennale (1999 and 2005), documenta 11 (2002), São Paulo Art Biennial (2008) and the Sydney Biennale in 2002 and 2018.

Ahtila has won several art and film awards, including the inaugural Vincent Award (2000), Artes Mundi (2006), Prince Eugen Medal (2008), and most recently Art Academic in Finland (2009).

Her work is held in the collections of the Tate and the Museum of Modern Art in New York. She is a former professor at the Department of Time and Space-based Art at the Finnish Academy of Fine Arts (Finland).

== Artistic career ==
Writing in the journal PAJ, Jane Philbrick describes Ahtila's films as "Smart, emotionally arresting, engaging, affective." Philbrick continues, saying, "A self-described 'teller of human dramas', she approaches narrative equipped with a rigorous arsenal of postmodern strategies ... One of her most potent tools, however, is a two-centuries-old dramatic genre of proven emotional reach and punch, melodrama." Although done in a more sophisticated way than conventional melodramas, Ahtila's work likewise exaggerates plots and characters to affect the viewer's emotions, with less appeal to immediate intellectual comprehension.

In 1993, Ahtila created the three mini-films Me/We, Okay, and Gray: Each of these 90-second mini-films was shown separately and as a trilogy, as trailers in cinemas, on television during commercial breaks and in art galleries. Ahtila explores questions of identity and group relations through her use of narrative conventions derived from film, television and advertising. In Me/We the father of a family speaks about his family in a monologue and other players mouth his words. When the father speaks about his family members' emotions, their personalities mix together and become inseparable. In Okay a woman is speaking about violence in man and woman relationship and as she steps across the room like a tiger in a cage, her voice goes up and shows pure violence. In Gray three women in a lift go down into the water and talk about the atomic explosion and its effects, while words and pictures mix identity crisis and an atomic disaster.

In 2002, Ahtila created a film called The House, for which she performed research that included conducting interviews with people who are afflicted by psychotic mental disorders. The film begins with a woman driving to a secluded house, and as events continue they take on a dreamlike state. The sounds become disorienting and the images begin to combine: the woman can see the car on the walls of the house; she hears boat horns that make no sense. The film is meant to be presented in an exhibit that displays each of the three screens on separate walls, making the viewer feel as if they are actually in the house where the project was filmed.

Also in 2002, she had a solo show at Tate Modern, and in 2006 her multi-screen video piece The Wind (2006) was exhibited at the Museum of Modern Art (MoMA). She has also had solo shows at the Guggenheim in Bilbao, Moderna Museet in Stockholm, the Neue Nationalgalerie in Berlin, the Parasol Unit in London, ACMI in Melbourne and DHC/ART in Montreal.

Among Ahtila's many other works is The Hour of Prayer, first presented in 2005 at the Venice Biennale in Italy. The film is a four-channel video project that shows scenes from a woman's experience surrounding the death of her dog. Bridget Goodbody, writing for Time Out New York, says that it presents "a nonnarrative cycle of apparently random, but nonetheless consequential scenes." Some of those scenes show how, when she was away from her dog, he fell through the ice of a frozen pond, breaking his leg. Another shows the dog brought to a veterinarian for treatment of the injury; a diagnosis of bone cancer is made. After the dog dies, the film presents scenes of the woman moving on with her life, living as an artist in Africa.

Another of her films, which debuted in 2009, is Where is Where?. New York's Museum of Modern Art, which housed the seven-day exhibition, called it, "a haunting and layered consideration of how history affects our perception of reality." In the film, a present-day poet, with the assistance of a figure who is the personification of death, investigates a murder committed fifty years ago. Two young Arab boys had killed their French friend during the Algerian War of Independence. As the poet investigates, images from the past and present begin to mix and collide; at one point the poet discovers the two boys seated in a boat, in the small swimming pool behind his house.

Horizontal, a six-screen video installation occupying a whole wall of the Shirley Sherwood Gallery. The spruce tree is filmed in separate sections at different times, so the lighting, colour, and movement vary. The images are accompanied by a natural soundtrack.

In 2011, Ahtila's installation Horizontal first showed at the Marian Goodman Gallery, at Moderna Museet in 2012, at Espoo Museum of Modern Art in 2014, and at other galleries including in 2025 the Shirley Sherwood Gallery at Kew Gardens. The piece is a six-projection high-definition installation showing a 30-metre tall spruce tree. Each projection shows a different part of the tree, which is arranged horizontally across the six screens. The visual display, lasting six minutes, is accompanied by a natural soundtrack including birdsong and the creaking of the tree trunk in the wind. Ahtila distorts the tree with tilts of the camera and different coloring for each projection. Ahtila states that in the work she was trying to "make visible the limits, or edges, of human perception and to try to show the idea introduced by Jakob von Uexküll – of the simultaneous existence of different worlds, different times and spaces." She added that cinema cannot show everything, that nature and "human cinematic expression" exist in parallel rather than meeting.

Although Ahtila's films do include more than one character, they tend to focus on the internal experience of just one person. Her work seems to be more about studying and understanding an individual's subjective experience, and how the influences around individuals shape who they are and what they do, and shape their unconscious selves. She is greatly interested in the factors that go into the construction of personal identity, and in how fluid that construct can be. Ahtila wants to explore, as she says, "how the subconscious is inherited in some way," citing as an example, "[the way] in which my mother is physically present in myself and I am present in her."

== Works ==
=== Installations ===
- Me/We, Okay, Grey (1993), 3-channel monitor installation with furniture
- If 6 was 9 (1995), 3-channel projected installation
- Today (1996), 3-channel projected installation
- Anne, Aki and God (1998), 5-monitor & 2-screen installation with furniture
- Consolation Service (1999), 2-channel projected installation
- The Present (2001), 5-channel monitor installation with furniture
- The House (2002), 3-channel projected installation
- The Wind (2002), 3-channel projected installation
- Sculpture in the Age of Posthumanism (2004), a sculpture which includes the viewer
- The Hour of Prayer (2005), 4-channel projected installation
- Fishermen / Études N°1 (2007), single channel projected installation
- Where is Where? (2008), 6-channel projected installation
- The Annunciation (2010), 3-channel projected installation
- Horizontal (2011), 6-channel projected installation
- Studies on the Ecology of Drama (2014), 4-channel projected installation
- Potentiality for Love (2018), a hybrid installation that combines sculpture with moving image

=== Films ===
- Me/We, Okay, and Gray (1993), three 90-second mini-films, each of which was shown separately and as a trilogy, as trailers in cinemas and on television during commercial breaks. Ahtila explores questions of identity and group relations through her use of narrative conventions derived from film, television and advertising.
- If 6 was 9 (1995)
- Today (1996), won Honorable Mention in 1998.
- Consolation Service (1999), Received Venice biannual prize.
- Love is a Treasure (2002)
- The Hour of Prayer (2005)
- Where is Where? (2008)
- The Annunciation (2010)
- Studies on the Ecology of Drama (2017)

== Awards ==
- 2000, Vincent Award
- 2006, Artes Mundi, Wales International Visual Arts Prize, Cardiff, UK
- 2008, Prince Eugen Medal, Royal Palace, Stockholm
- 2009, Title of Academician of Art, presented by the President of Finland, Helsinki, Finland
