= Leipsic =

Leipsic is a former English and very rare former French spelling for the German city of Leipzig.

Leipsic may also refer to:

== Places in the United States ==
- Leipsic, Delaware
- Leipsic, Indiana
- Leipsic, Ohio
- West Leipsic, Ohio
- Leipsic River, Delaware

== People ==
- Brendan Leipsic (born 1994), Canadian ice hockey player

== See also ==
- Leipzig (disambiguation)
