= New Leipzig School =

Painting movement in Germany

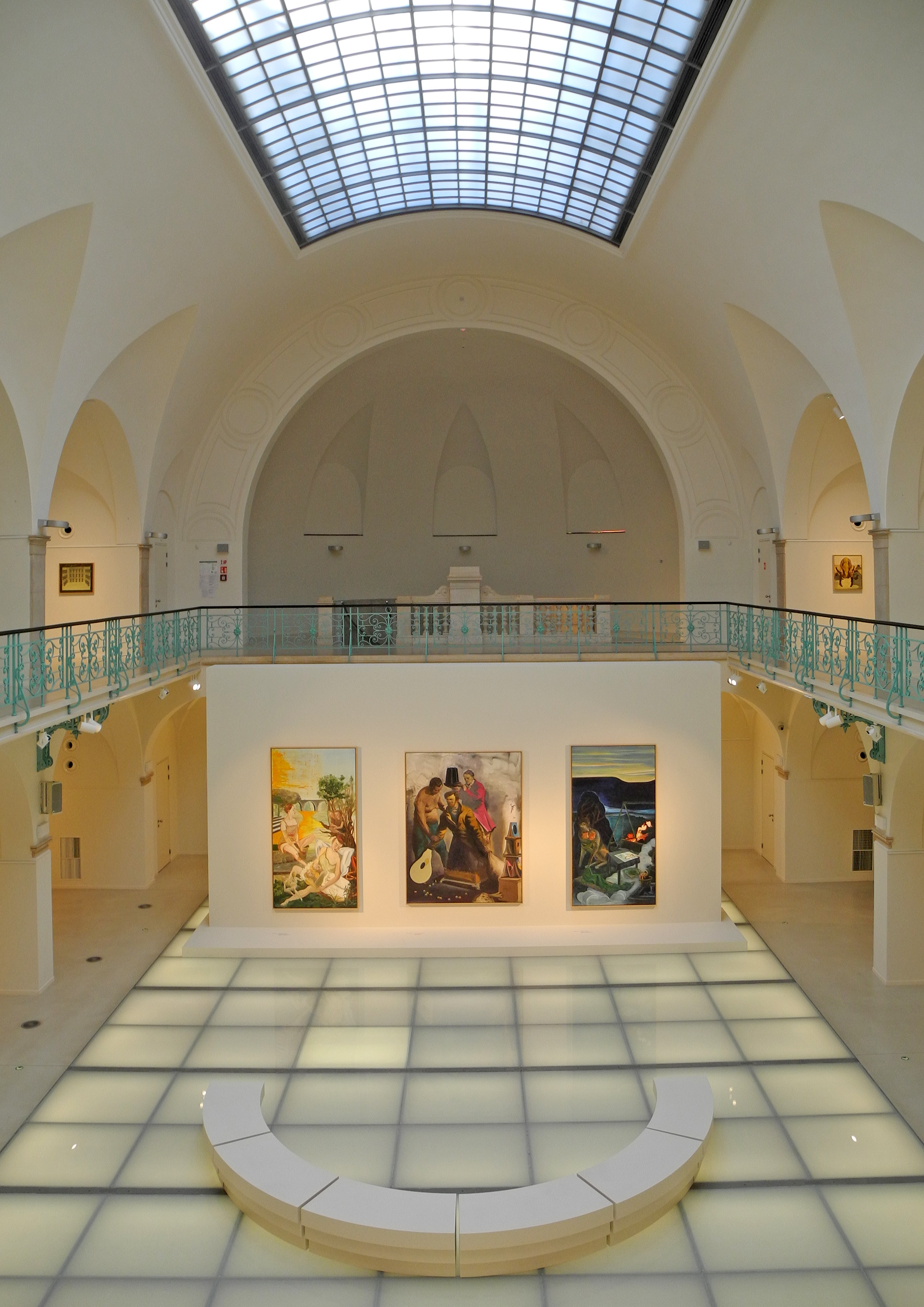
Exposition of paintings of Rosa Loy and Neo Rauch in Liberec in the Czech Republic (2024)

The New Leipzig School (German: Neue Leipziger Schule) is a movement in German painting, centred in the city of Leipzig after the German reunification. The usage and origins of this term are debated.

== History and characteristics ==
The Alte Leipziger Schule (Old Leipzig School) is a term for the original Leipziger Schule (Leipzig School), established no later than 1977, after the involvement of Werner Tübke, Wolfgang Mattheuer and Bernhard Heisig with documenta 6. The students of those artists, including Sighard Gille and Arno Rink, are considered to be the second generation of the Leipziger Schule (Leipzig School).

The Neue Leipziger Schule (New Leipzig School), is the third generation of the movement, and relates to the post-reunification climate of modern Germany. It is still closely linked with the Hochschule für Grafik und Buchkunst Leipzig. It usually refers to the students of Gille and Rink, but occasionally those of Rolf Kuhrt or even Heisig or Tübke. Its works tend to be characterised by a combination of figurative and abstract elements.

The list of painters that are classified in this school includes Neo Rauch, Christoph Ruckhäberle and Matthias Weischer. Others who have been associated with the term include Tim Eitel, Tilo Baumgärtel, Christian Brandl, David Schnell, Aris Kalaizis, Martin Kobe, Michael Triegel, Ulf Puder, Rosa Loy and Axel Krause.

A significant role in the commercial success of the "New Leipzig School" was played by the gallery owner Gerd Harry Lybke, who introduced the works of Rauch in particular to the globally important American art market. Other Leipzig artists were able to achieve international acclaim in the wake of this, such as the Greek-German painter Aris Kalaizis. Parallels can be seen between these successes and those of the Young British Artists. Also crucial for the Leipzig painters' success was Matthias Kleindienst, gallery owner and head of the woodcutting workshop at the Hochschule, whose search for talent paved the way for many young Leipzig artists, including Weischer. Another major factor in their market success was the "LIGA" art project, established in Berlin in 2002 under the direction of Christian Ehrentraut, a former collaborator with Lybke.

Many artists and galleries associated with the Leipziger Schule are based in the west of Leipzig, and at the Spinnerei in Plagwitz.
