= Elte, North Rhine-Westphalia =

Coordinates: 52°15′N 7°31′E

Prior to 1975, Elte was, with approximately 1,300 residents, a self-standing, political community under the authorities of Rheine. On 1 January 1975, Elte became integrated with other communities within the town of Rheine, 9 km from the centre of Rheine town. Elte still has character of a rural location situated between Emsaue and the countryside. It is now officially named Rheine-Elte.

The name "Elte" is first mentioned in a document from the year 1154. In the "Codex traditionum", which is kept in the State Archives in Münster, is in Volume VI page 181 read: Bishop Werner of Münster founded in 1140 an Augustinian monastery in Asbeck. The noble Eppo of Burgsteinfurt gave this monastery two mansions (farms), located in parochia Rene in villa quae "Elethe'dicitur".

The linguists interpret all place and field names ending in èthè and èdè as heathlands. The vernacular then gave the village the name "Elte" over time.

== People ==
- Josef Pieper (1904-1997), Christian philosopher
- Matthias Weischer (born 1973), painter
