= Hunter's Room =

Painting by Neo Rauch

- Artist: Neo Rauch
- Year: 2007
- Medium: Oil on canvas
- Dimensions: 110 cm × 160 cm (43 in × 63 in)
- Location: Private collection

Hunter's Room (German: Jagdzimmer) is a 2007 painting by the German artist Neo Rauch. It depicts a group of people carrying crossbows in a room with a map on the back wall and birds hanging from the roof. The painting was part of the exhibition Para which was made for the Metropolitan Museum of Art and shown there in 2007.

== Reception ==
Peter Schjeldahl of The New Yorker wrote about the characters in the painting: "Their poses have the charged solemnity of Balthus, without the erotic crackle. Nothing seems to be at issue for them. (The bird is beyond caring.) But masterly areas of the painting, astonishingly varied in style, captivate."

== Legacy ==
Marian Brown St. Onge wrote a poem called "In This Hunter's Room" based on this painting. It was written for a 2009 anthology of poems inspired by paintings by Rauch.
