= Tilo Baumgärtel =

German painter

Tilo Baumgärtel (born 1972) is a German painter. He currently lives and works in Leipzig.

Baumgärtel was born in Dresden. He attended the Hochschule für Grafik und Buchkunst Leipzig from 1991 to 1994.

He is part of a group of young painters based in Leipzig, along with Matthias Weischer, Christoph Ruckhaberle and others. The common trait of the group is their production of large figurative oil paintings. His paintings derive from social realist works and propaganda posters in their draughtsmanship and dramatic use of shadow.

Baumgärtel has shown work in exhibitions including "7 x Malerei" at Museum der Bildenden Künste in Leipzig, FUTURE/Five Artists From Germany at Sandroni.Rey Gallery in Los Angeles, Painting Show at Wilkinson Gallery in London and Life After Death at Massachusetts Museum of Contemporary Art.

He is represented by Wilkinson Gallery in London, Christian Ehrentraut in Berlin and Adam Biesk in Los Angeles.

== See also ==
- List of German painters
