= Leipzig Airport =

Leipzig Airport may refer to one of the two airports in Leipzig, in Germany:

- Leipzig–Altenburg Airport, a small regional airport with no scheduled services
- Leipzig/Halle Airport, the international airport of the area
