= Wolfgang Mattheuer =

German painter, graphic artist and sculptor

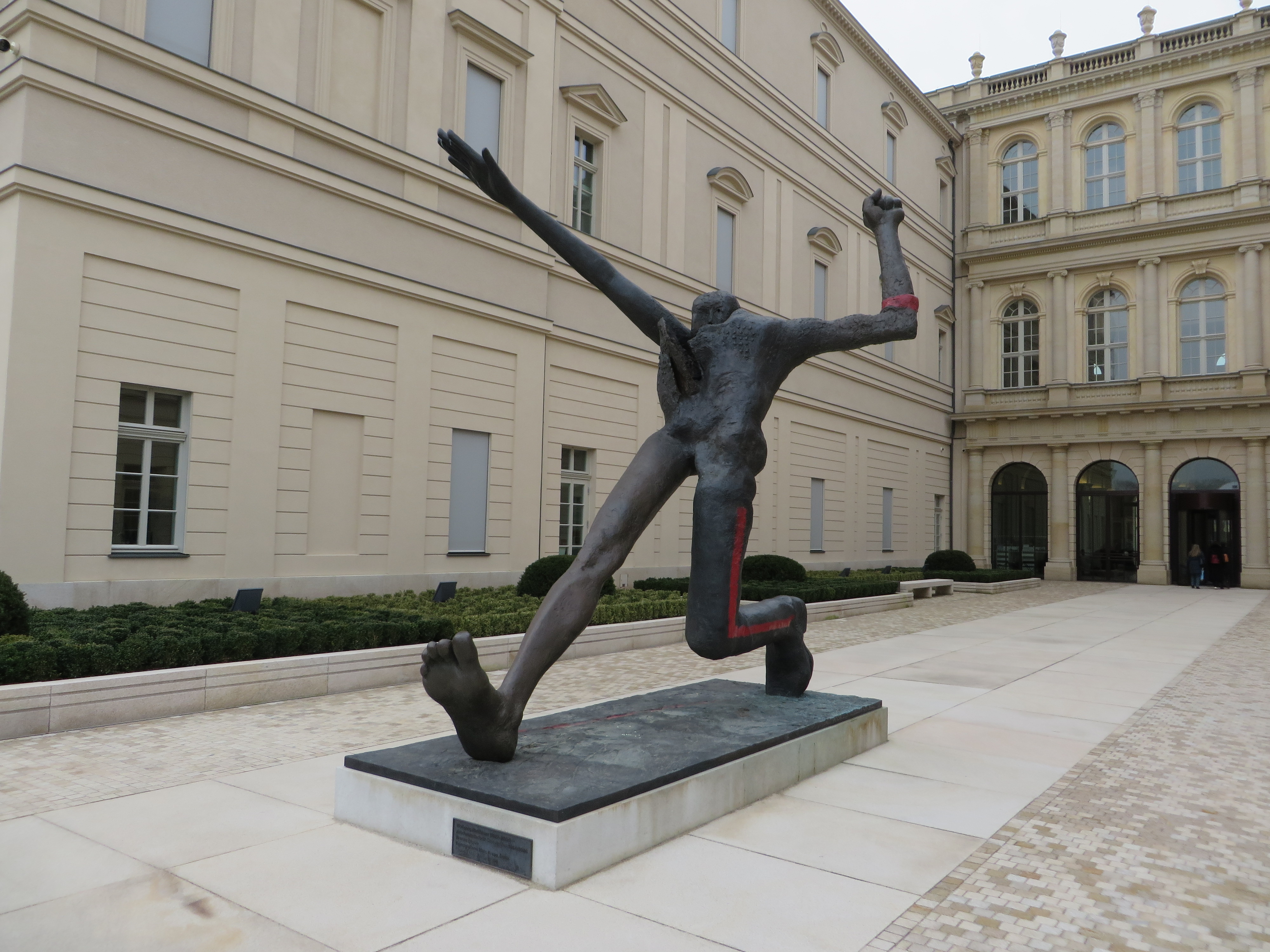
Der Jahrhundertschritt, a sculpture by Mattheuer which exists in several cities, here in Potsdam

Wolfgang Mattheuer (7 April 1927—7 April 2004) was a German painter, graphic artist and sculptor. Together with Werner Tübke and Bernhard Heisig he was a leading representative of the Leipzig School, a figurative art current in East Germany. He came to prominence with allegorical, pessimistic and sometimes heroic paintings which were accused of expressing political dissidence. He was later an open critic of both socialism and capitalism. He taught at the Hochschule für Grafik und Buchkunst Leipzig (HGB) for many years. In 1974 he resigned from his position as professor at the HGB to work as a freelance painter. In 1988 he left the Socialist Unity Party of Germany.

In the West he was for a long time seen as an untrendy Sunday painter, but a large retrospective held in Chemnitz for his 75th birthday raised his profile. He was married to the painter Ursula Mattheuer-Neustädt.
