= Mary Heisig =

American artist

Mary Heisig (1913-1966) was an American artist. Her work is included in the collections of the Whitney Museum of American Art and the Brooklyn Museum.
