= Carol Strickland =

American art historian (born 1946)

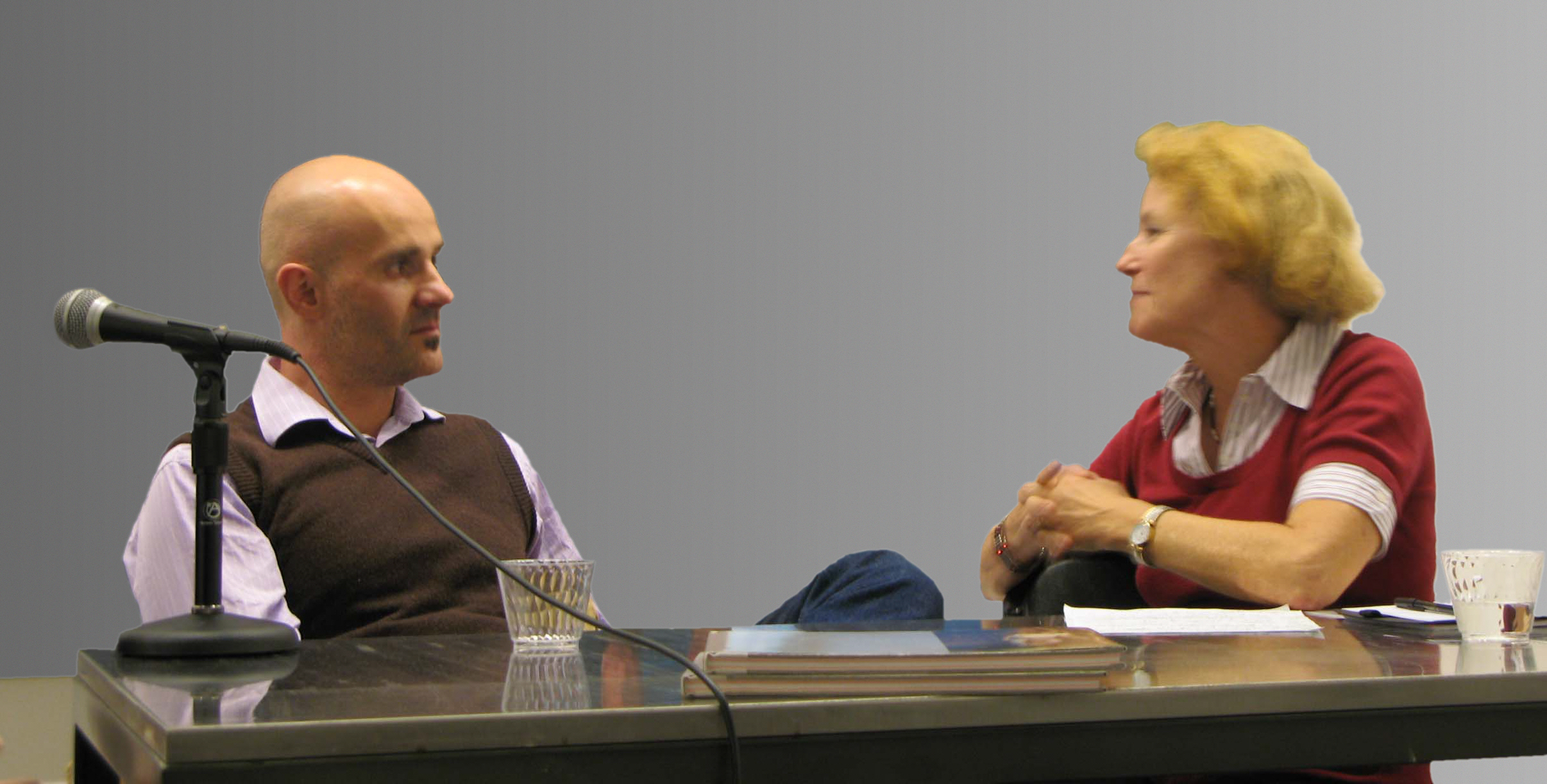
Aris Kalaizis and Carol Strickland

Carol Ann Colclough Strickland (born 1946) is an American art historian who currently resides in New York City.

Strickland graduated from Rhodes College in Memphis (Tennessee) in 1968. She studied English literature and earned a PhD from the University of Michigan in 1973. She taught at various universities during the 1980, such as Rutgers University and the State University of New York in Stony Brook. During a sabbatical in Geneva, Switzerland, she began writing widely on contemporary art. Having returned to the United States, she regularly published articles in The Christian Science Monitor, The New York Times, and The Wall Street Journal, but also for magazines, such as The Nation and Art & Antiques. Her articles are mainly focused on art and architecture. She is also the author of The Annotated Mona Lisa and The Annotated Arch. The Annotated Mona Lisa includes articles on art history and architectural history from antiquity to the post-modern period. It has been translated in various languages.

She is married to the biochemist Sidney Strickland who is a professor at the Rockefeller University.

== Publications ==
- The Annotated Mona Lisa: A Crash Course in Art History from Prehistoric to Post-Modern, Andrews McMeel Publishing, 2. Aufl., 2007 ISBN 978-0-7407-6872-9
- The Illustrated Timeline of Western Literature, 2007
- The Illustrated Timeline Of Art History: A Crash Course In Words & Pictures, 2006
- The Annotated Arch: A Crash Course in the History Of Architecture, Andrews McMeel Publishing, 2001 ISBN 978-0-7407-1024-7
