= Mel Leipzig =

American painter (1935–2025)

- Born: Melvin Donald Leipzig; May 23, 1935; Brooklyn, New York City, U.S.
- Died: October 31, 2025; Princeton, New Jersey, U.S.
- Education: Cooper Union, Yale University (BFA), Pratt Institute (MFA)
- Occupations: Visual artist, arts educator
- Known for: Painter, printmaker, portraitist
- Children: 2
- Website: www.melleipzig.com

Melvin Donald Leipzig (May 23, 1935 – October 31, 2025) was an American visual artist and arts educator, known for his realist portraits in acrylic paint. He lived in Trenton, New Jersey, and exhibited his work both nationally and internationally.

== Life and career ==
Mel Leipzig was born on May 23, 1935, in Brooklyn, New York City. He attended Cooper Union, and received a BFA degree at Yale University, and a MFA degree at Pratt Institute.

From 1968 until 2013, Leipzig taught art courses at Mercer County Community College. Starting in 1990 Leipzig painted with a limited palette, in four colors: dark blue, dark red, yellow and white. He was profiled on the television series State of the Arts on NJ PBS, in an episode titled "Mel Leipzig: Everything is Paintable" (2017).

Leipzig’s artwork can be found in the collections of the New Jersey State Museum, the Zimmerli Art Museum at Rutgers University, the Yale University Art Gallery, the Whitney Museum, the National Academy Museum and the Cooper Hewitt, Smithsonian Design Museum.

Leipzig was a longtime resident of Trenton, New Jersey. He died in Princeton, New Jersey, in 2025 at the age of 90. The date of his death was reported variously as October 31 or November 1.
