= Goetz Collection =

Art museum in Munich, Germany

Coordinates: 48°09′58″N 11°37′23″E

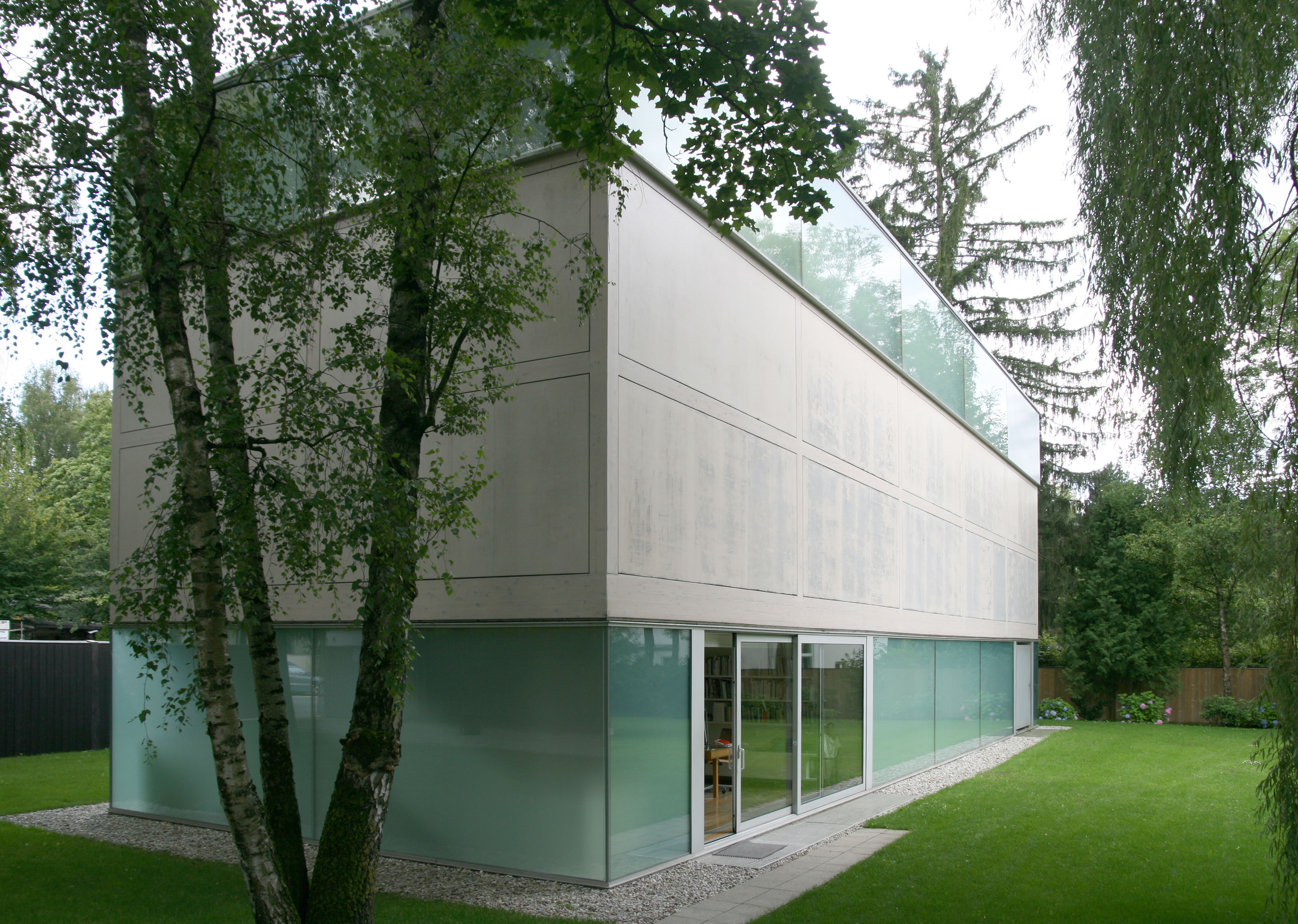
View of the museum and its surroundings.

The Goetz Collection (Sammlung Goetz) is a private collection of contemporary art in Munich, Germany. It opened in 1992. The collection is owned and continually being enlarged by the former gallery dealer Ingvild Goetz, who presents the collection to the public in a series of themed exhibitions in a purpose built museum. Rather than taking an encyclopedic view, the collection focuses on developing particular artists.

Sammlung Goetz organizes exhibitions along with video and film programmes on the lower level of the building. The building was designed by the Swiss architectural firm Herzog & de Meuron.

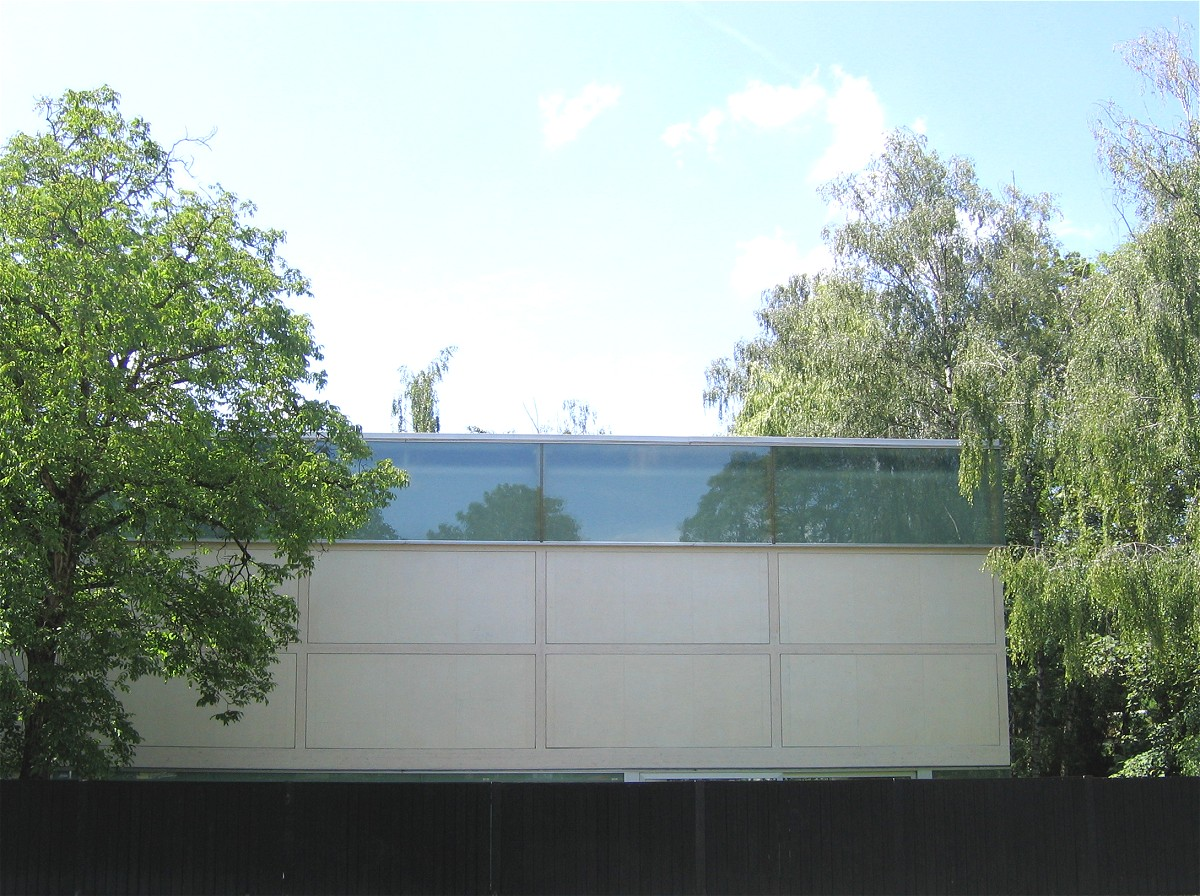
View from Oberföhringer Straße.
