= Leipziger Baumwollspinnerei =

Redeveloped industrial site in Leipzig, Germany

Coordinates: 51°19′40″N 12°19′11″E

Logo

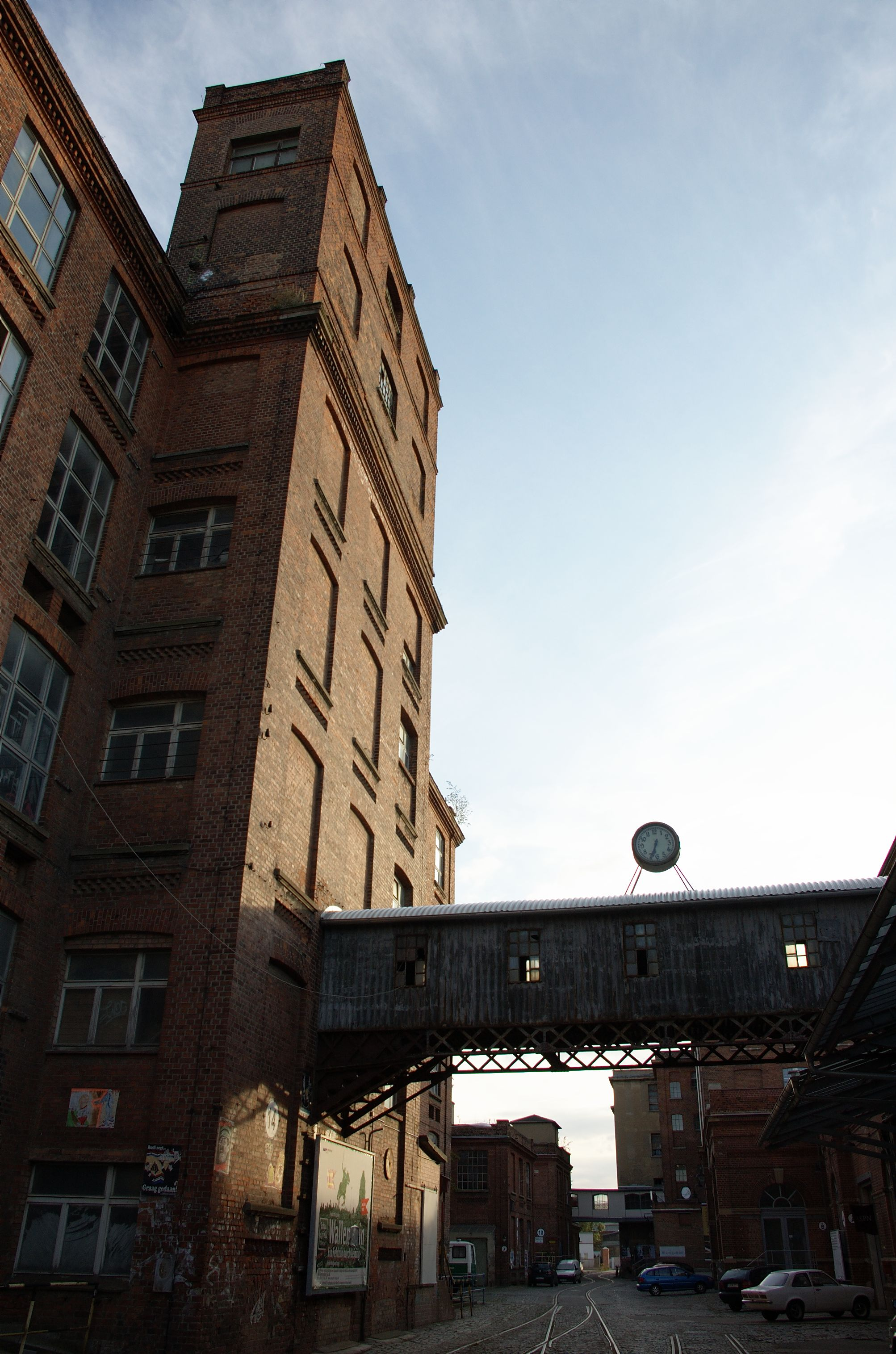
Building and bridge on the site of the old cotton mill

The Leipziger Baumwollspinnerei (Leipzig Cotton Mill) is an industrial site in Leipzig, Germany. Parts of this 10-hectare site in the locality of Lindenau are used today by art galleries, studios and restaurants.

Founded in 1884, the business developed into the largest cotton mill in continental Europe over the next quarter century. During this time, an entire industrial town with over 20 factories, workers' housing, kindergartens and a recreational area, grew in western Leipzig. The mill reached its maximum extent in 1907, with 240,000 spindles processing cotton across a working area of about 25 acres (100,000 m^{2}). Until the First World War, cotton production took place on the cotton plantations of Leipzig, Cherhami near Sadani and Kissanke on the Wami in German East Africa. Up to 4,000 people worked there, until production of thread was halted in 1993 following the reunification of Germany several years earlier.

Subsequently, the area was repopulated by a mixture of people including craftsmen, self-employed, and above all artists, many belonging to the so-called "New Leipzig School". More than half of the available space has since been rented out again for new purposes.

Ten galleries, a communal arts center (Halle 14), and around 100 artists (including Neo Rauch, Jim Whiting, Hans Aichinger, and Matthias Weischer) have all settled at the site, as well as restaurants, fashion designers, architects, printers, a goldsmith, a pottery, a film club, a porcelain manufacturer, and an arts supply store.

Antonin Girardin writes that the art complex Baumwollspinnerei has 22 mentions in the international press which produce Leipzig's image as a city of cultural innovation.

The site contained several platform interchanges from a now-disused railway between Lindenau and Plagwitz. Parts of the platforms are still intact.
