= Christoph Ruckhäberle =

German artist

Christoph Ruckhäberle (born 1972, Pfaffenhofen an der Ilm, West Germany) is an artist based in Leipzig. Ruckhäberle studied at the California Institute of the Arts from 1991 to 1992, and received his BFA in painting in 1995 and his MFA in 2002 from Hochschule für Grafik und Buchkunst in Leipzig. He is associated with the New Leipzig School.

His work has been shown in many exhibitions including the 2nd Prague Biennale, plus the LIGA Gallery in Berlin and Marianne Boesky in New York City. Ruckhäberle has also exhibited at galleries including Arario Gallery in Korea, Nicolai Wallner in Copenhagen, Denmark and Ghislaine Hussenot in Paris, France. Ruckhäberle is represented by Campoli Presti in London and Paris, Nicolai Wallner in Copenhagen, Galerie Kleindienst in Leipzig and Zieher Smith & Horton in New York.
