= Bernhard Heisig =

German painter

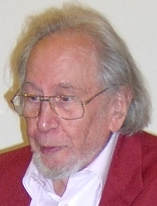
Heisig in 2008

Bernhard Heisig (31 March 1925 – 10 June 2011) was a German painter and graphic artist. Long-time director of the Leipzig Academy (Hochschule für Grafik und Buchkunst; 1961–64, 1976–87) and a leading figure in East Germany's Leipzig School, which included Wolfgang Mattheuer and Werner Tübke, he painted in the tradition of Max Beckmann, Otto Dix, and Oskar Kokoschka. His experiences from World War II on both the western and eastern fronts were a recurring subject in his art beginning in the late 1960s, and it is for these works that he is best known in the West. Highly regarded on both sides of the Berlin Wall in the 1980s, he was at the center of controversy after German unification when his painting Time and Life was selected to hang in the German parliament. The painting is a panorama of German history and hangs in the cafeteria on the first floor of the Reichstag building. The controversy was part of the larger German-German Bilderstreit (image battle) over what role East German art and artists should be allowed to play in the new Germany.
