= Leipzig School (painting) =

Movement of modern painting

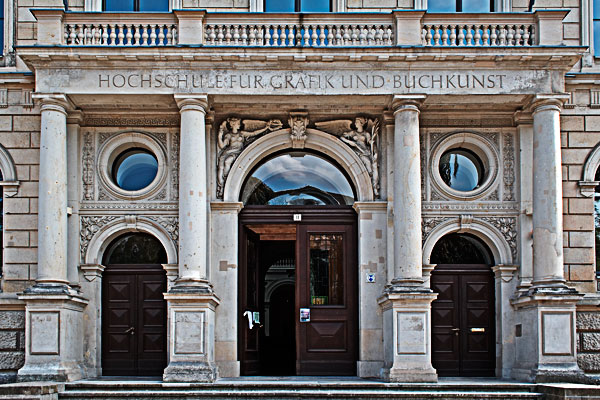
The Hochschule für Grafik und Buchkunst, in Leipzig

The Leipzig School (German: Leipziger Schule) is a movement of modern painting from the 1960s to 1980s, founded by painters who predominantly lived and worked in Leipzig, East Germany. The movement had its centre at the Hochschule für Grafik und Buchkunst, where several of the most prominent members were teachers. Some of their students, or students of students, became prominent and are referred to as the New Leipzig School.

== History ==
The first origins of the Leipzig School are rooted in the city's art scene in the 1960s.

The main representatives of the Leipzig School (Leipziger Schule) were Werner Tübke (1929-2004), Wolfgang Mattheuer (1927-2004) and Bernhard Heisig (1925-2011). All three studied at the Leipzig art academy, the HGB, Hochschule für Grafik und Buchkunst (University for Graphics and Book Art) and became professors there themselves in the 1960s and 1970s.

Two currents can be distinguished. Heisig's works belong to a group of expressive and colorfully passionate pictures. The second group, to which Mattheuer and Tübke are counted, is more factual and formally strict.

All three were repeatedly attacked by the political leadership, only to be courted again at other times. The art of the GDR has the Leipzig School to thank for the fact that the framework of socialist realism prescribed by the party was abandoned in the 1970s and 1980s.

Their idiosyncratic imagery made Leipzig a respected center of fine arts in the GDR and thus laid the foundation for the international reputation of the so-called New Leipzig School since 2004.
