= Neo Rauch =

German artist (born 1960)

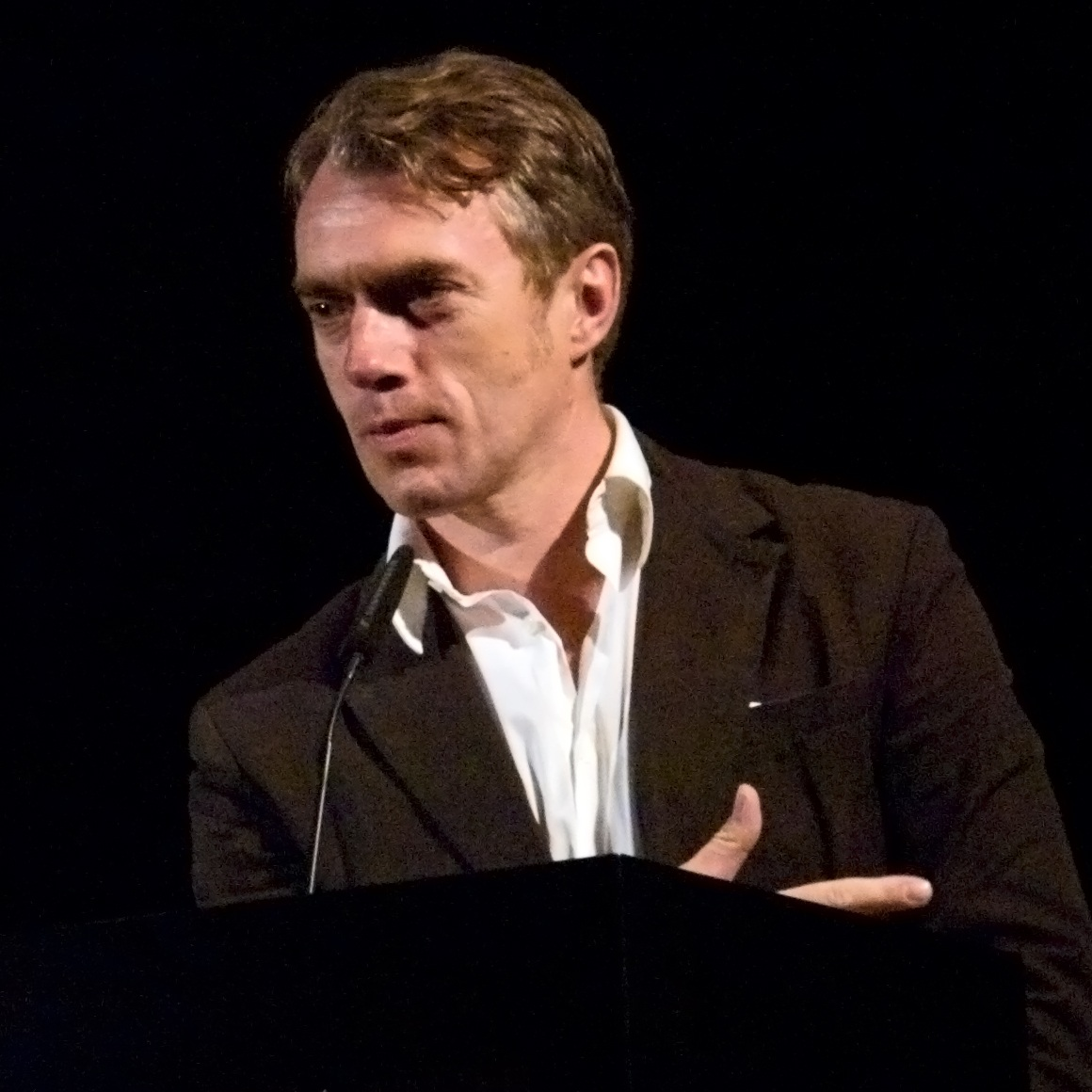
- Rauch in Brühl, Germany, 2007
- Born: 18 April 1960 (age 66); Leipzig, East Germany (now Germany)
- Education: Hochschule für Grafik und Buchkunst Leipzig
- Known for: Painting
- Movement: New Leipzig School
- Awards: Vincent Award, 2002

Neo Rauch (German: [ˈneːo ˈʁaʊx]; born 18 April 1960) is a German artist whose paintings mine the intersection of his personal history with the politics of industrial alienation. His work reflects the influence of socialist realism, and owes a debt to Giorgio de Chirico and René Magritte. He studied at the Hochschule für Grafik und Buchkunst Leipzig, and he lives in Markkleeberg near Leipzig, Germany and works as the principal artist of the New Leipzig School. The artist is represented by Galerie EIGEN + ART Leipzig/Berlin and David Zwirner, New York.

Rauch's paintings suggest a narrative intent but, as art historian Charlotte Mullins explains, closer scrutiny immediately presents the viewer with enigmas: "Architectural elements peter out; men in uniform from throughout history intimidate men and women from other centuries; great struggles occur but their reason is never apparent; styles change at a whim."

== Life ==
Rauch's parents died in a train accident when he was four weeks old. His father Hanno Rauch was 21, his mother Helga Wand 19 years old - at the time both of them studied art at the Hochschule für Grafik und Buchkunst Leipzig (Leipzig Academy of Visual Arts). Neo Rauch grew up with his grandparents in Aschersleben and passed his Abitur exam at the Thomas-Müntzer-Oberschule (now Gymnasium Stephaneum). He studied painting at the Hochschule für Grafik und Buchkunst Leipzig and then was Masterstudent with Professor Arno Rink (1981–1986) and with Professor Bernhard Heisig (1986–1990). After the fall of the GDR Rauch worked from 1993 to 1998 as an assistant to Arno Rink and Sighard Gille at the Leipziger Akademie.

In 2004, he was a selector for EASTinternational with Gerd Harry Lybke.

From August 2005 until February 2009, he was Professor at the Leipziger Hochschule für Grafik und Buchkunst. Together with Timm Rautert he was curator for the exhibit "Man muss sich beeilen, wenn man noch etwas sehen will..." ("One has to hurry, if one still wants to see something...") at Gut Selikum in Neuss.

Rauch works with his spouse and artist Rosa Loy at a former cotton-mill, Leipziger Baumwollspinnerei, about which he says: "It is the location of concentration and inspiration. Here the best ideas come to me." With an estimated fortune of €100 million, he was ranked one of the richest 1,001 individuals and families in Germany by the monthly business publication Manager Magazin in 2017.

Rauch is the subject of the 2016 film Neo Rauch: Comrades and Companions, directed by Nicola Graef.

== Exhibitions ==
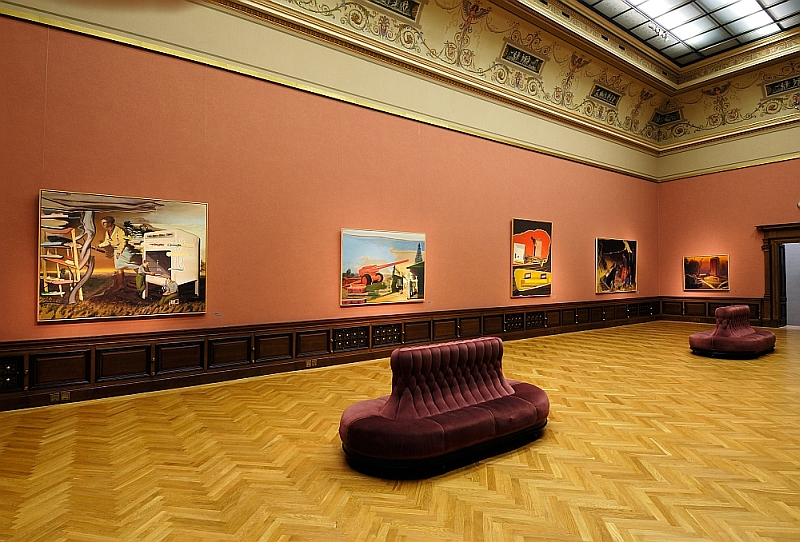
Exhibition at Galerie Rudolfinum, Prague, 2007

In 1991 Neo Rauch had his first solo exhibition in the Leipzig Galerie am Thomaskirchhof. In 1993, the deputy director of the Museum für Moderne Kunst Frankfurt, Rolf Lauter, discovered the artist's work and, thanks to the support of the Jürgen Ponto-Stiftung, realized a first non-commercial presentation of his then latest works in the exhibition rooms of Dresdner Bank Frankfurt. In the catalog text, Lauter referred to Rauch's combinatorial principle of sampling, incorporating elements from art history, paraphrases of surrealism and metaphors of the banal everyday world. Rauch won the Vincent Award in 2002, which received a corresponding solo show at the Bonnefanten Museum in Maastricht, The Netherlands, that same year. In 2010, Rauch had his first museum retrospective, which was jointly held at the Museum der bildenden Künste in Leipzig, Germany, and the Pinakothek der Moderne, Munich, Germany. In 2011, a selection of the works from this retrospective then traveled to the Zachęta National Gallery of Art in Warsaw, Poland. In 2007, the Galerie Rudolfinum in Prague held a retrospective entitled "Neue Rollen," organized by the Kunstmuseum Wolfsburg, of Rauch's works covering 13 years.

Other solo exhibitions include the Musée d’art contemporain de Montréal, Montreal, Canada (2006); Kunstmuseum Wolfsburg, Wolfsburg, Germany (2006); Centro de Arte Contemporáneo Málaga, Málaga, Spain (2005); and the Albertina, Vienna, Austria (2004). His work was featured at the 2005 Carnegie International in Pittsburgh, Pennsylvania, and he had his first solo North American museum exhibition at the Saint Louis Art Museum in St. Louis, Missouri in 2003–2004. In 2013, he got his first Belgian solo exhibition at the Centre for Fine Arts in Brussels (Belgium), called Neo Rauch. The Obsession of the Demiurge. Selected Works 1993-2012.

== Works ==
In painting "Characteristic, suggestion and eternity" are important marks of quality.

I view the process of painting as an extraordinarily natural form of discovering the world, almost natural as breathing. Outwardly it is almost entirely without intention. It is predominantly limited to the process of a concentrated flow. I am deliberately neglecting to contemplate all of the catalytic influences that would have the power to undermine the innocence of this approach because I would like to express a degree of clarity in these lines by way of example. I view myself as a kind of peristaltic filtration system in the river of time ...

Rauch is considered to be part of the New Leipzig School and his works are characterized by a style that depends on the Social Realism of communism. Especially American critics prefer to recognize in his contemporary style a post communist Surrealism. But more than anyone Rauch is recognized as an east–west painter. Rauch merges the modern myths of both the Warsaw Pact and the Western world. His figures are portrayed in a landscape in which an American Comic-Aestheticism meets the Social Realism of communism. In the art publication Texte zur Kunst (Texts about Art, number 55), he was defined as an example for a new German neo-conservatism.

In the US, Roberta Smith, art critic for the New York Times, called attention to Rauch's work in 2002 with an article about the "painter who came in from the cold." In 2007, Rauch painted a series of works especially for a solo exhibition in the mezzanine of the modern art wing at the Metropolitan Museum in New York City. This special exhibition was called "Para." Rauch explains that he enjoys the associations the word "para" evokes in his own mind, and says that his works at "Para" have no particular intention, but that they could signify anything to anyone.

When I first agreed to do the Met exhibition, I thought about a way of working that would be about the nature of a museum. But straight away I realized that I was much more interested in those "visions from the Witches Circle" in my studio than I was in coming up with things in a purely thematic way. Calling them "visions" reflects my personality—they precede inspiration and spring from the moment when internal images appear at the prompting of intellectual decisions. I have no choice but to accept everything that I discover in this way.

=== Para ===
Paranoia, oil on canvas painting by Neo Rauch, 2007

Works for "Para":

- Jagdzimmer (Hunter's room), 2007
- Vater (Father), 2007
- Die Fuge (The Fugue/The Gap), 2007
- Warten auf die Barbaren (Waiting for the Barbarians), 2007
- Para, 2007
- Paranoia, 2007
- Goldgrube (Gold Mine), 2007
- Vorort (Suburb), 2007
- Der nächste Zug (The Next Move/The Next Draw), 2007
- Die Flamme (The Flame), 2007

The works created for "Para" are characterized by three elements: a pre-communist civic-mindedness, communist Social Realism, and an idealized countryside. On the other hand, it's a prefix which evokes associations like para-normal, para-dox or para-noia.
It may be read in a system connection, for example a picture like Paranoia reflects the cognitions theory in a hermetic room.

Leipzig, Rauch's city of birth, is known historically as a city of trade through its association with the Leipzig Trade Fair. This civic-mindedness of a trader's city also expressed itself under communism where Leipzig was the center of popular resistance that led to Die Wende. Rauch uses characters and images of life of pre-communist civil society that was oppressed by communism in the GDR. The oppression of communism and the total control of civic life under the rule of communist ideology is one of the elements of Rauch's work. The destructive powers of ideologies is perhaps the reason why Rauch refuses to interpret his own work as a powerful statement in favor of a cultural relativism that characterized the civic bourgeois thought that was destroyed.

== Art market ==
Rauch most expensive painting at the art market was Platz (Square) (2000), who sold by £1,058,500 ($1,761,231) at Christie's London, on 13 February 2014.

== Awards ==
- 1992 Renta-Preis 1992, Nuremberg
- 1997 Kunstpreis der Leipziger Volkszeitung, Leipzig
- 2002 Vincent Award, Bonnefanten Museum Maastricht, Netherlands
- 2005 Kunstpreis Finkenwerder
- 2010 Stiftungspreis der ökumenischen Stiftung Bibel und Kultur 2010, Stuttgart
- 2012 Order of Merit of Saxony-Anhalt
- 2018 Order of Merit of the Federal Republic of Germany - Grand Cross 1st Class

== Public collections ==
Works by the artist are held, among others, in the following public collections:

- Bonnefantenmuseum, Maastricht
- The Broad, Los Angeles
- Carnegie Museum of Art, Pittsburgh
- Hamburger Bahnhof - Museum für Gegenwart, Berlin
- Hamburger Kunsthalle, Hamburg
- Kunstmuseum Den Haag, The Hague
- Kunstmuseum Wolfsburg
- Museum de Fundatie, Zwolle
- Museum der bildenden Künste, Leipzig
- Museum of Contemporary Art, Los Angeles
- Museum of Modern Art, New York
- National Gallery of Canada, Ottawa
- Pinakothek der Moderne, Munich
- San Francisco Museum of Modern Art
- Stedelijk Museum Amsterdam

== Sources ==
- Lauter, Rolf (1993). Neo Rauch oder die Suche nach den Ursprüngen der Malerei in der Gegenwart, Jürgen Ponto-Stiftung, Dresdner Bank AG, Frankfurt am Main, September - November 1993. OCLC 921140932.
- Meaney, Thomas (October 4, 2021). "The antagonist : why Neo Rauch can't avoid controversy". Profiles. The New Yorker. Vol. 97, no. 31. pp. 20–26.
- Mullins, Charlotte (2006). Painting People: figure painting today. New York: D.A.P. ISBN 978-1-933045-38-2
- Mössinger, Ingrid, Ralph Keuning, David Salle (2025). Neo Rauch. London: Phaidon. ISBN 978-1-838669-41-6
