= Hochschule für Grafik und Buchkunst Leipzig =

Art school in Leipzig, Germany

Hochschule für Grafik und Buchkunst Leipzig (Academy of Fine Arts Leipzig)
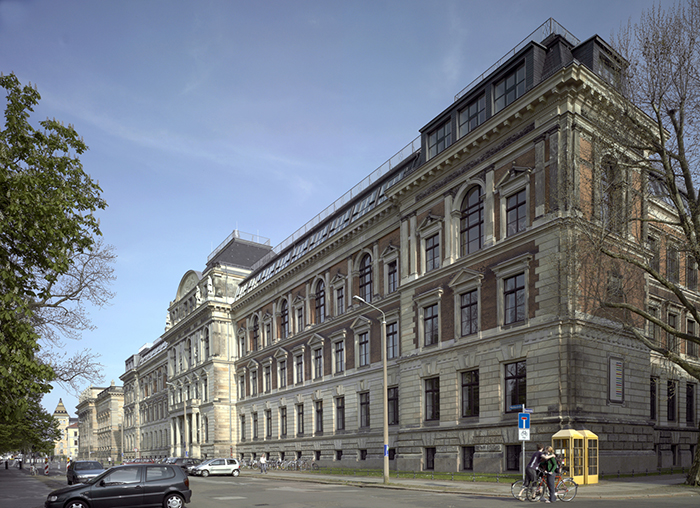

Location
- Leipzig, Saxony; Germany
- Coordinates: 51.3334°N 12.3678°E

Information
- Other name: Leipzig College of Graphics and Book Art, Academy of Visual Arts Leipzig, Academy of Fine Arts Leipzig, University of Graphics and Book Art Leipzig
- Type: Art school; public school
- Established: 1764 (262 years ago)
- Founder: Prince Francis Xavier of Saxony
- Campus type: Urban
- Website: hgb-leipzig.de/en

The Hochschule für Grafik und Buchkunst (HGB) or Academy of Fine Arts Leipzig is one of the oldest art schools in Germany, dating back to 1764.

The academy has four colleges specializing in fine arts, graphic design, photography and new media art with around 500 students.

It is the home of two notable modern-art movements, the so-called Leipzig School and New Leipzig School.

== History ==
On 6 February 1764, Prince Francis Xavier of Saxony became the founding administrator of a new painting academy, in the name of his nephew, Prince-Elector Frederick Augustus I of Saxony, who was still a minor. The institution was initially subordinate to the Dresden Academy of Fine Arts. The first director was the painter Adam Friedrich Oeser, who remained in this position until his death in 1799.

The first premises were established in the city center in the autumn of 1764, in the Leipzig Amtshaus, and in the summer of 1765, it moved to the west wing of the current Leipzig Town Hall on Pleissenburg. The following autumn, Goethe, who was interested in painting as well as law, was a student there; Oeser noted him as one of the most gifted students. They remained friends. Later, the painting school developed and opened up to courses in drawing and architecture.

Around 1835, the institution officially took the name Leipzig Academy of Fine Arts (Akademie der bildenden Künste). The director surrounded himself with a professor of architecture and two teachers of freehand drawing. The lessons were, at this time, free.

Between 1863 and 1871, the school was reorganized. The architecture department was temporarily abolished. The new director, Ludwig Nieper (1826–1906), who served for thirty years, brought about further major structural changes.

From 1876, the institution was renamed the Royal Academy of Fine and Applied Arts (Königliche Kunstakademie und Kunstgewerbeschule). In 1893, a department of creative photography was established, something quite unprecedented at the time. Nieper then closed the architectural arts department, and in 1896, the sculpture department. He initiated the construction of a new and imposing building on Wächterstrasse in the neighbourhood Musikviertel, where the academy is currently located.

In 1900, after Nieper's departure, the school was renamed the Royal Academy of Graphic Arts and Books (Königliche Akademie für graphische Künste und Buchgewerbe): Leipzig was historically and at that time the site of the world 's largest book and publishing trade fair. Since 1897, the sculptor, painter and graphic artist Max Klinger (1857–1920) had taught there.

The painter Philippine Wolff-Arndt (1849–1940) convinced director Max Seliger to accept women into her academy, which in 1905 became the first art school in Germany to accept female students.

After the fall of the German Empire and the disappearance of the Kingdom of Saxony, the academy was renamed Staatliche Akademie für graphische Künste und Buchgewerbe (State Academy of Graphic Arts and Books). By 1938, it was the third-largest school in the Reich in terms of student numbers, after the Academy of Fine Arts Vienna and the Academy of Arts in Berlin.

On 26 April 1947, the academy was reopened under the current name Academy of Visual Arts Leipzig (Hochschule für Graphik und Buchkunst Leipzig, abbreviated HGB) in the building erected in 1896 at Wächterstrasse 11. From 1946 to 1949, Walter Arnold was a professor there. From 1951, Albert Kapr (1918–1995) taught typography and book crafts there.

In the 1970s, students from the academy founded the Leipziger Schule movement; the HGB gradually took on a national and international dimension, notably thanks to new generations of artists such as Wolfgang Mattheuer, Bernhard Heisig, Werner Tübke, Arno Rink, Sighard Gille and Ursula Arnold. After the fall of the Berlin Wall, the Federal Law of 10 April 1992 relating to the status of public universities, confirms the school in its mission, centered on graphic and visual arts.

Between 2005 and 2014, Neo Rauch, an artist of international stature, was a professor at the HGB, which also included Clemens von Wedemeyer and Heribert C. Ottersbach.

== Facilities ==
The Hochschule für Grafik und Buchkunst Leipzig (HGB) is housed in a historic building located at Wächterstraße 11 in Leipzig. The main building, constructed in 1896, serves as the central hub for the academy's academic and administrative activities. It is equipped with various specialized workshops and studios that support the institution's focus on fine arts and design.

The academy provides facilities for disciplines such as painting, printmaking, photography, media art, and book design. These include workshops for letterpress printing, artistic offset printing, lithography, and other traditional and contemporary techniques. Additionally, the HGB maintains a gallery space for exhibitions and a specialized academic library that supports research and study in art and related fields.

The main building offers barrier-free access via the Grassistraße entrance through the inner courtyard. A barrier-free restroom is located in the basement, accessible by elevator. Opening hours during the lecture period are Monday to Friday from 08:00 to 00:30, and Saturday and Sunday from 10:00 to 17:00. During lecture-free weeks, the building is open Monday to Friday from 08:00 to 22:00, and Saturday from 12:00 to 17:00.

== Study ==
The Hochschule für Grafik und Buchkunst Leipzig (HGB) offers academic programs in the fields of fine arts and design. The primary degree conferred is the Diplom, a traditional German higher education qualification. The HGB also offers a Master of Arts (M.A.) program.

=== Diploma programs ===
The HGB provides four main Diplom programs:

- Book Design / Graphic Design
- Photography
- Painting / Printmaking
- Media Art

Each program is structured into a two-year foundational course followed by a three-year main course. The foundational course focuses on developing technical, artistic, and theoretical skills, while the main course allows for specialization within the chosen field. Students engage in individual and group instruction, practical work, workshops, and exhibitions.

=== Master's program ===
The HGB offers a Master of Arts program titled Cultures of the Curatorial, which focuses on curatorial practices and theory.

=== Meisterschüler*innen program ===
Graduates of the Diplom programs may apply for the Meisterschüler*innen program, a postgraduate course aimed at further developing artistic practice. This program typically spans four semesters and involves close mentorship by a professor.

=== Additional offerings ===
The HGB also hosts the Academy for Transcultural Exchange (AtA), a program initiated in 2016 to provide art and design education opportunities for individuals with refugee backgrounds.

== See also ==
- Architecture of Leipzig - Italian Neorenaissance regarding the main building of the academy
- List of art schools
- List of schools in Germany
