= Leipziger Jahresausstellung =

German art exhibition

The Leipziger Jahresausstellung (LIA) was an art exhibition held in Leipzig from 1910-1927 by mainly German modernist artists such as Max Klinger and Max Liebermann. Since 1992, there has been a new series of events under the same name featuring contemporary works by Leipzig artists.

== History ==
In 1910, the Verein Bildender Künstler Leipzig (e.V.) held its first annual exhibition in the Städtisches Kaufhaus. The following concern was pursued with it:

The Secession has set itself the task of organising an annual exhibition in Leipzig. Through this exhibition, the association aims to promote the ideal and economic aspirations of Leipzig painters, sculptors and graphic artists and, on the other hand, to be active in the development of our local art and thus also to secure Leipzig a significant position in German artistic life. The exhibition, which not only contains works by Leipzig artists, but in which artists from all German art cities are represented, shows in what a commendable way the enterprise of the Leipzig Secession has attracted the attention of foreign artists and no less of the Leipzig Artists' Association and the Leipzig Artists' Union.

In order to realise the annual presentation, Max Klinger and other Leipzig artists as well as art lovers founded the "Verein Leipziger Jahresausstellung e.V." on 15 January 1912. The association was chaired by Max Klinger and the sculptor Johannes Hartmann. In the 1912 show, which took place in the Städtischer Handelshof at Grimmaische Strasse 1, over 200 German and European artists exhibited paintings and sculptures. Among them were many well-known names of the art now celebrated as classical modernism. Participants included, among others Ernst Barlach, Max Beckmann, Franz Hofer, Käthe Kollwitz, Claude Monet, Wilhelm Lehmbruck, Max Liebermann, Henri Matisse, Max Pechstein, Pablo Picasso, Pierre-Auguste Renoir, Auguste Rodin and Max Slevogt participated in the exhibition with one or more works. The last of these exhibitions took place in 1927.

== Re-foundation in 1992 ==
In 1992, the association Leipziger Jahresausstellung e.V. was founded by artists and committed citizens. Since 1995, the chairman of the association has been the Leipzig art professor Rainer Schade. Since 1993, the association has been organising Leipziger Jahresausstellung (Leipzig Annual Exhibitions) at changing venues, each with about 25 Leipzig artists.

== Causa Krause ==
In 2019, the painter Axel Krause was selected as an exhibiting artist by the board of trustees of the 26th Leipzig Annual Exhibition and invited to participate by the board. As a result, public pressure was exerted on the board of the L.J.A. Am 31 May 2019, widerrief der Vorstand die Einladung an Axel Krause, sagte am 1. Juni 2019 die 26. Leipziger Jahresausstellung ab und trat geschlossen zurück. As of 6 June 2019, L.J.A. announced that the 26th Leipzig Annual Exhibition would take place from 12 June 2019.

=== Art Prize ===
Since 1999, a jury independent of the association has chosen an annual award winner, so far:

- 1999 Michael Kunert
- 2000 Ruth Habermehl
- 2001 Annette Schröter
- 2002 Christiane Baumgartner
- 2003 Edgar Knobloch
- 2004 Christoph Ruckhäberle
- 2005 Jana Seehusen
- 2006 Jörg Ernert
- 2007 Sebastian Gögel
- 2008 Uwe Kowski
- 2009 Thomas Moecker
- 2010 Akos Novaky
- 2011 Rosi Steinbach
- 2012 Alexej Meschtschanow
- 2013 Bastian Muhr
- 2014 Martin Groß
- 2015 Thomas Taube
- 2016 Benjamin Dittrich
- 2017 Annika Kleist
- 2018 Stefan Hurtig
