= Holéczy =

Holéczy is a surname. Notable people with the surname include:

- Endre Malcolm Holéczy (born 1982), Hungarian-American-Swiss theater director, actor, and writer
- Tibor Holéczy (1943–2024), Hungarian cross-country skier
