= Museum in the Kulturbrauerei =

- Established: 2013
- Location: Berlin, Germany
- Coordinates: 52°32′25″N 13°24′50″E
- Type: History museum
- Director: Mike Lukasch
- Website: www.hdg.de/museum-in-der-kulturbrauerei/ (German)

The Museum in the Kulturbrauerei is a museum of contemporary German history. The permanent exhibition focuses on everyday life in the German Democratic Republic. It is located in the Kulturbrauerei building complex in Prenzlauer Berg district (Borough of Pankow) in Berlin, Germany.

The subject of the permanent exhibition presented by the Museum in the Kulturbrauerei is "Everyday life in the GDR". It shows the complex tension between the expectations of the political system and the real living conditions of the people in the GDR. The Industrial Design Collection brings together products, posters, archive materials and photographs to document the history of design and culture in everyday life in the Soviet Occupied Zone/East Germany. The exhibition consists of around 800 original objects as well as over 200 documents, film and sound recordings and biographical reports.

The Museum in the Kulturbrauerei opened its doors for visitors in November 2013. It is located in the former Schultheiss brewery, which is now a listed site. The Foundation Haus der Geschichte der Bundesrepublik Deutschland developed this historical building for a modern museum. Admission is free.

The museum offers a free audioguide to the permanent exhibition in English, German, Spanish, French and Italian.

== See also ==
- Haus der Geschichte
- Tränenpalast
- Zeitgeschichtliches Forum Leipzig
