= Zeitgeschichtliches Forum Leipzig =

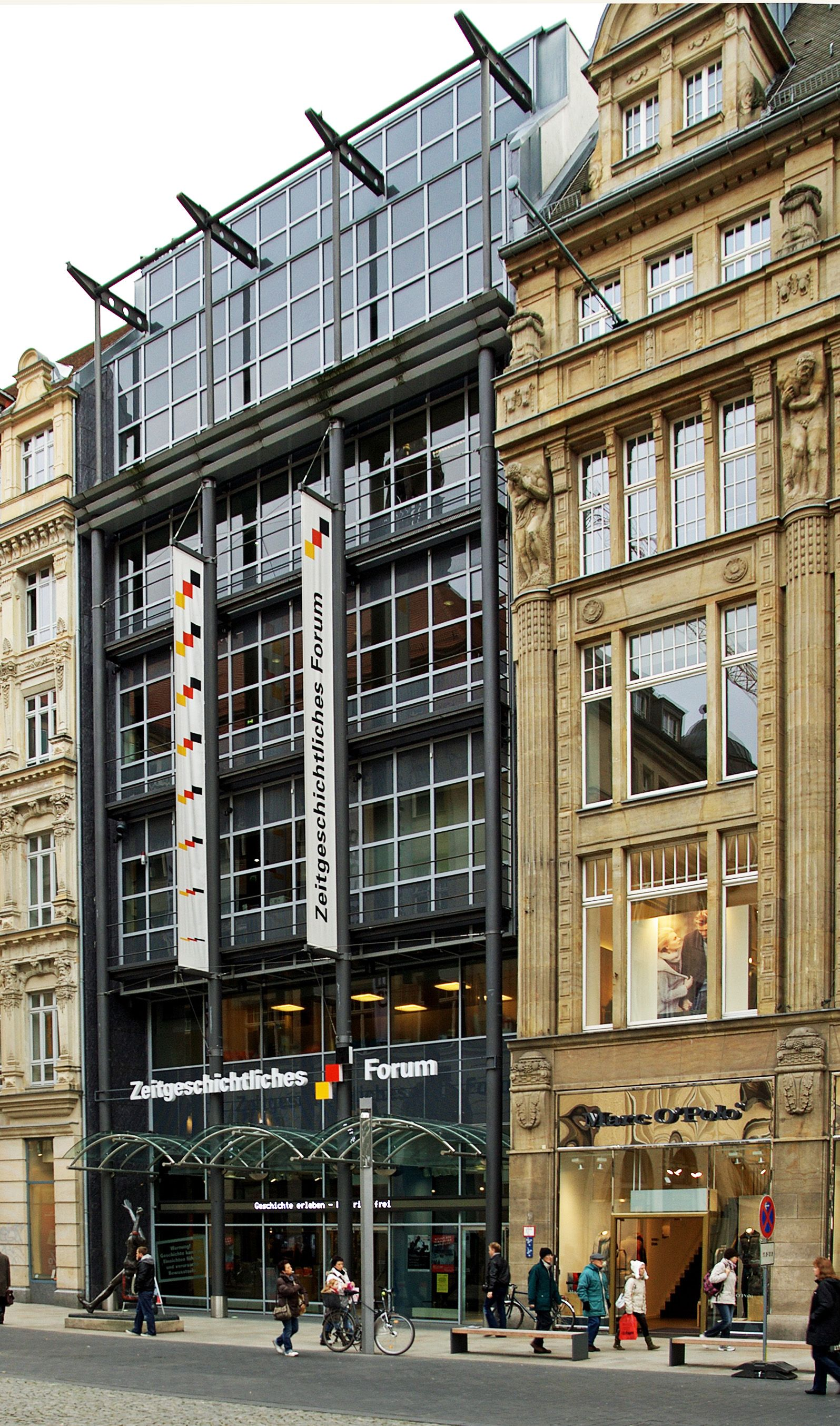
- Exterior of the museum, November 2009
- Established: October 9, 1999
- Location: Leipzig, Germany
- Coordinates: 51°20′23″N 12°22′33″E
- Type: History museum
- Director: Uta Bretschneider
- Public transit access: Leipzig Markt station
- Website: www.hdg.de/zeitgeschichtliches-forum/ (German)

The Zeitgeschichtliches Forum Leipzig (English: Forum of Contemporary History) is a museum of contemporary German history. Opened in 1999, the museum explores Germany’s postwar division, daily life under East Germany’s communist dictatorship, and the events leading to German reunification. It is located in the Grimmaische Strasse in the city center of Leipzig, Germany. A landmark of the museum is the sculpture The Step of the Century by Wolfgang Mattheuer in front of it.

The permanent exhibition explores resistance and civil disobedience under the authoritarian, single-party rule of the Socialist Unity Party of Germany (SED). It also examines daily life in the Soviet occupation zone and the German Democratic Republic (GDR), tracing developments from the end of the Second World War in 1945 through the Peaceful Revolution of 1989 and German reunification. An extensive redesign, completed in 2018, expanded the exhibition’s coverage of the post-reunification era. This includes the achievements and challenges of integrating the formerly divided country, alongside international terrorism, digitalization, and globalization. Around 2,000 artifacts, photographs, and films, together with numerous eyewitness interviews, bring these chapters of modern German history into focus.

In addition to its permanent collection, the museum presents several changing exhibitions each year. Moreover, it organizes lectures, readings, film screenings and other events on history. Its collection on GDR history comprises over 200,000 objects, for example the literary and artistic estate of Johannes Hegenbarth, author of GDR comic Mosaik. The museum is run by Haus der Geschichte foundation. Admission is free.

== See also ==
- Haus der Geschichte
- Tränenpalast
- Museum in the Kulturbrauerei
