= Tränenpalast =

Former border crossing between East and West Germany

Coordinates: 52°31′15″N 13°23′13″E

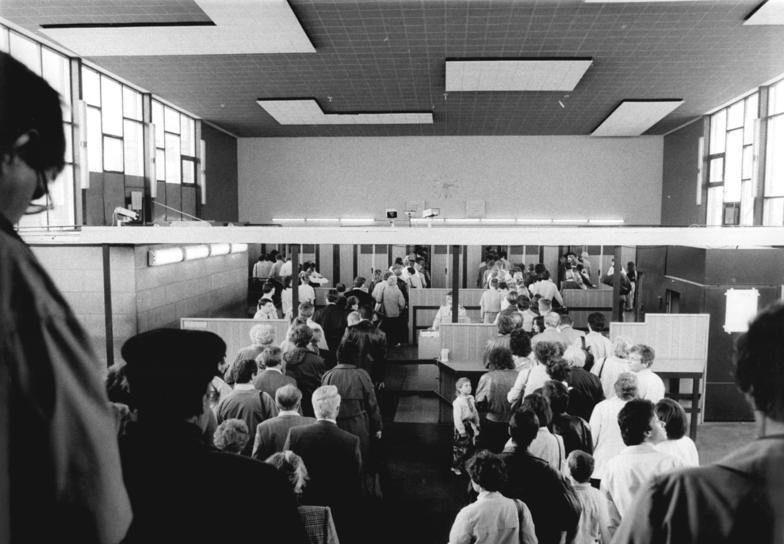
Inside the Tränenpalast border check point

Tränenpalast, Berlin

The Tränenpalast (English: "Palace of Tears") is a former border crossing point between East and West Berlin, at Berlin Friedrichstraße station, which was in operation between 1962 and 1989. It is now a museum with exhibitions about Berlin during the Cold War period and about the process of German reunification. It was the border crossing for travelers on the S-Bahn, U-Bahn and trains going between East and West Germany. It was used only for westbound border crossings. It had separate checkpoints for West Berliners, West Germans, foreigners, diplomats, transit travelers and East Germans.

The term Tränenpalast is derived from the tearful partings that took place in front of the building between western visitors and East German residents who were not permitted to travel to West Berlin.

== Border station during the time of the Berlin Wall ==
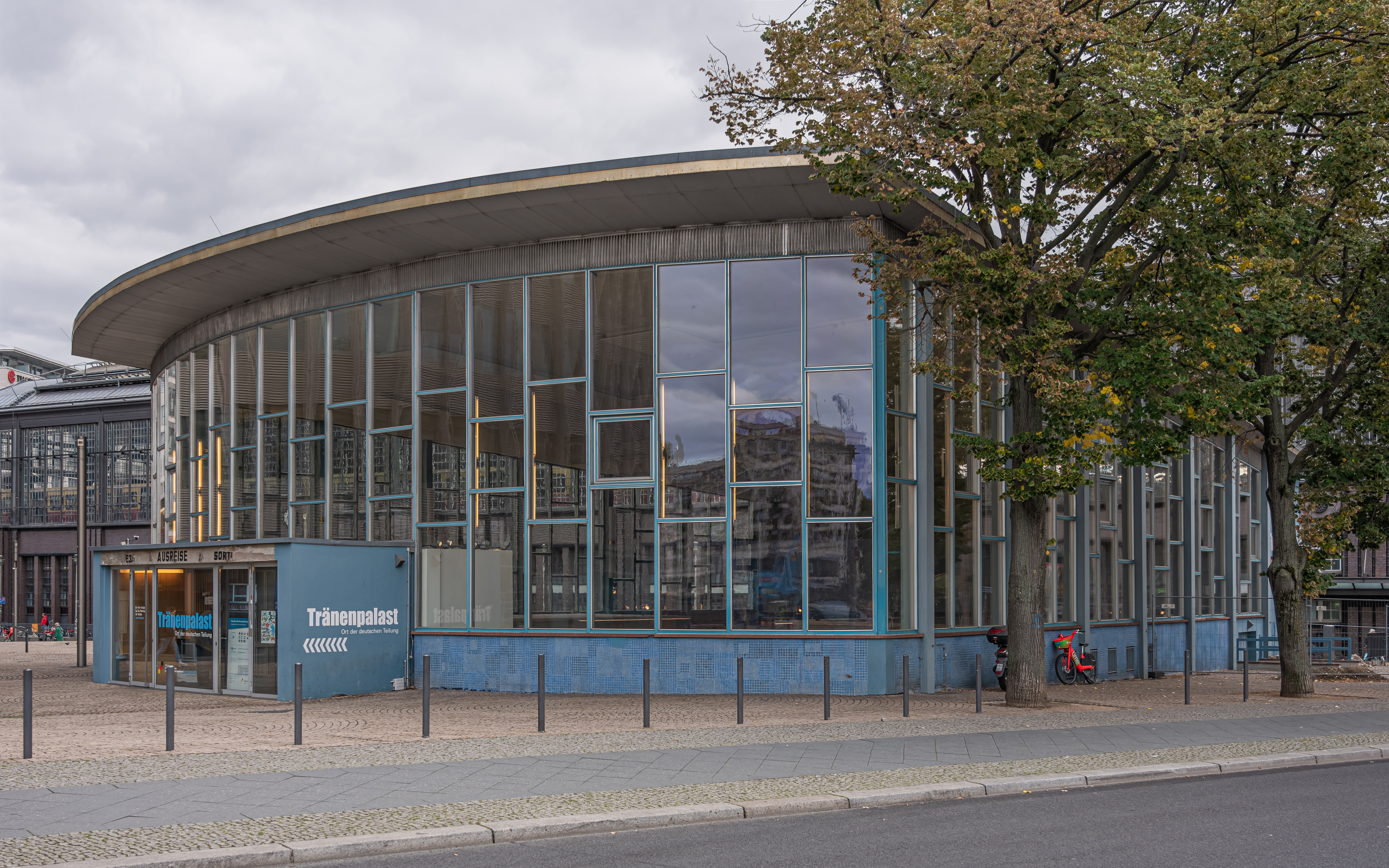
The Tränenpalast in October 2023

Although Berlin Friedrichstraße station was located entirely in East Berlin, most S-Bahn and U-Bahn only travelled from and to from West Berlin. Travelers in West Berlin could use the station to transfer between those lines, or to cross into East Germany. The Tränenpalast was built after the volume of traffic and the constraints of the lower level of the main building made it necessary to expand.

== After the fall of the Berlin Wall ==
After the fall of the Berlin Wall, the building was used as a nightclub and stage until 2006. It was listed as a protected historic monument on 2 October 1990 by the GDR government, a day before German reunification, which was on 3 October 1990.

== Museum ==
In 2008 the Tränenpalast became a federal memorial site. On 15 September 2011, the Haus der Geschichte opened the museum with exhibitions about Berlin during the Cold War. It displays original artefacts, documents, photographs and audio-visual material about the checkpoint and it provides an overview of the German reunification process.

It was opened by German Chancellor Angela Merkel on 14 September 2011. In its first two weeks more than 30,000 people visited the museum. Entrance is free.

== Gallery ==
=== During the Cold War ===
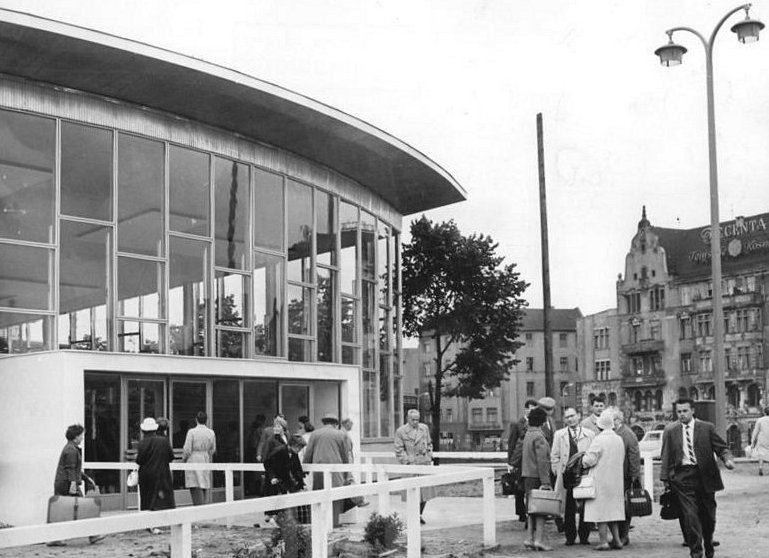
Entrance to the Tränenpalast.

=== During the Fall of the Berlin Wall ===
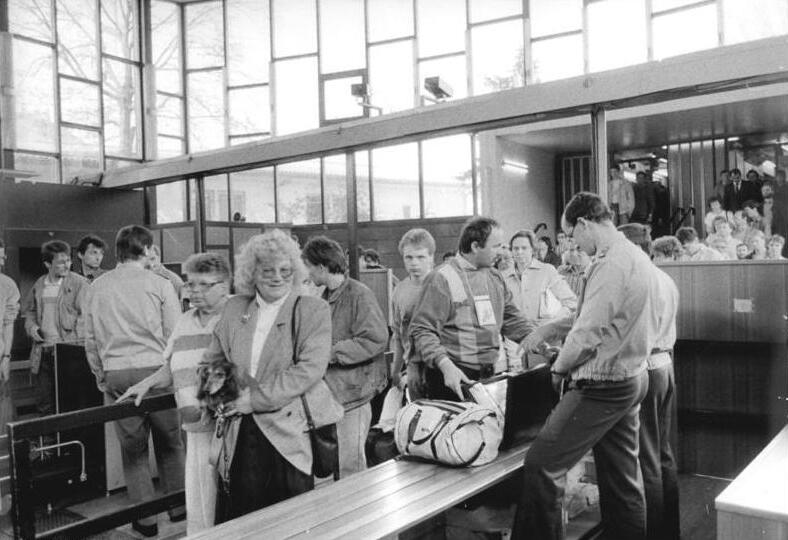
Custom checks by East German officers on those exiting East Berlin

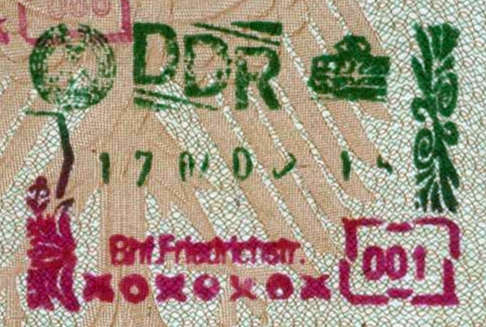
Passport stamp of the border crossing Friedrichstrasse.

=== Post German Reunification ===
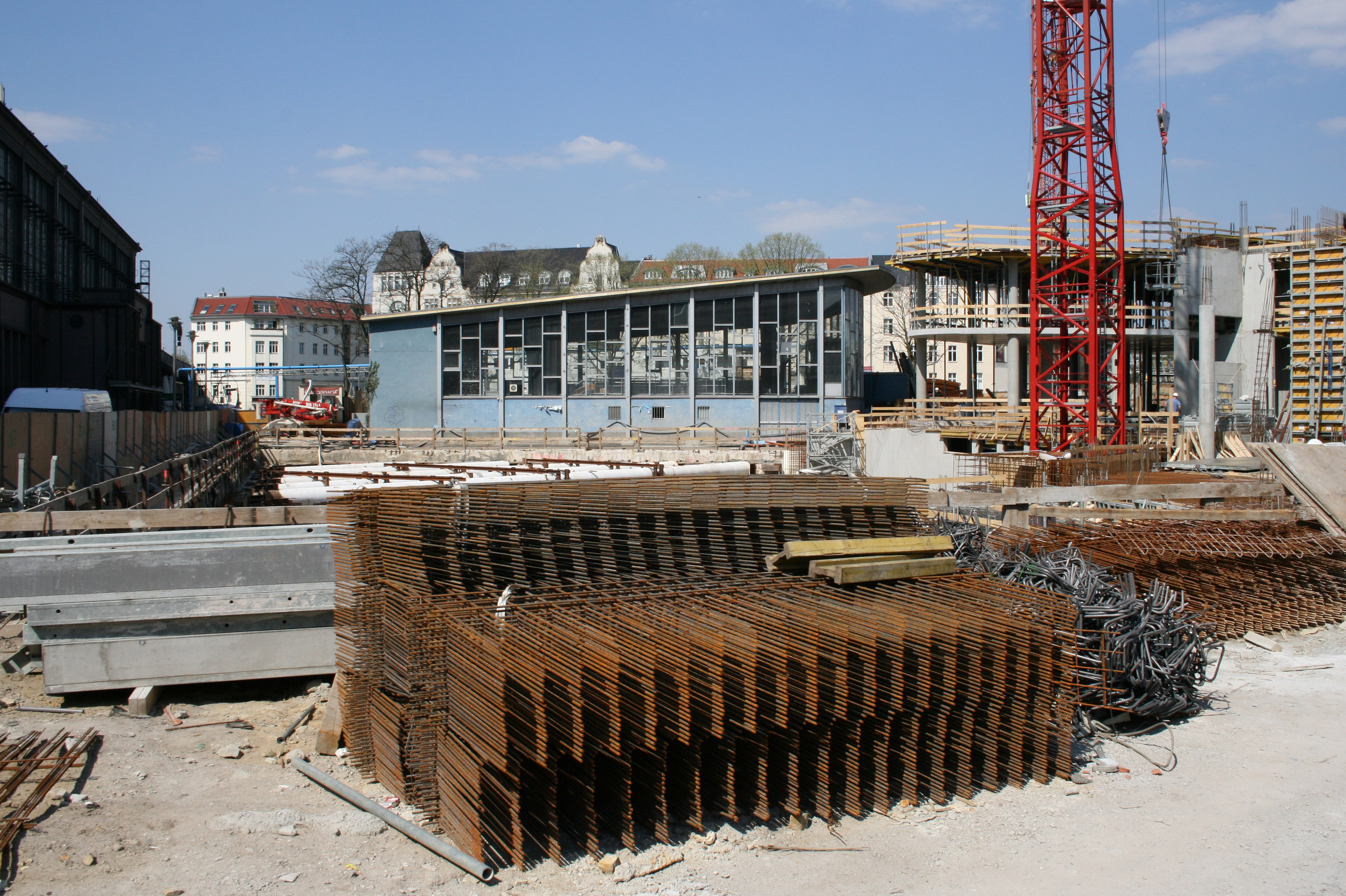
Construction near the Tränenpalast in 2008.

== See also ==
- DDR Museum
- Haus am Checkpoint Charlie
- Haus der Geschichte
- Museum in the Kulturbrauerei
- Stasi Museum
- Zeitgeschichtliches Forum Leipzig
