= The Step of the Century =

- Der Jahrhundertschritt (German)
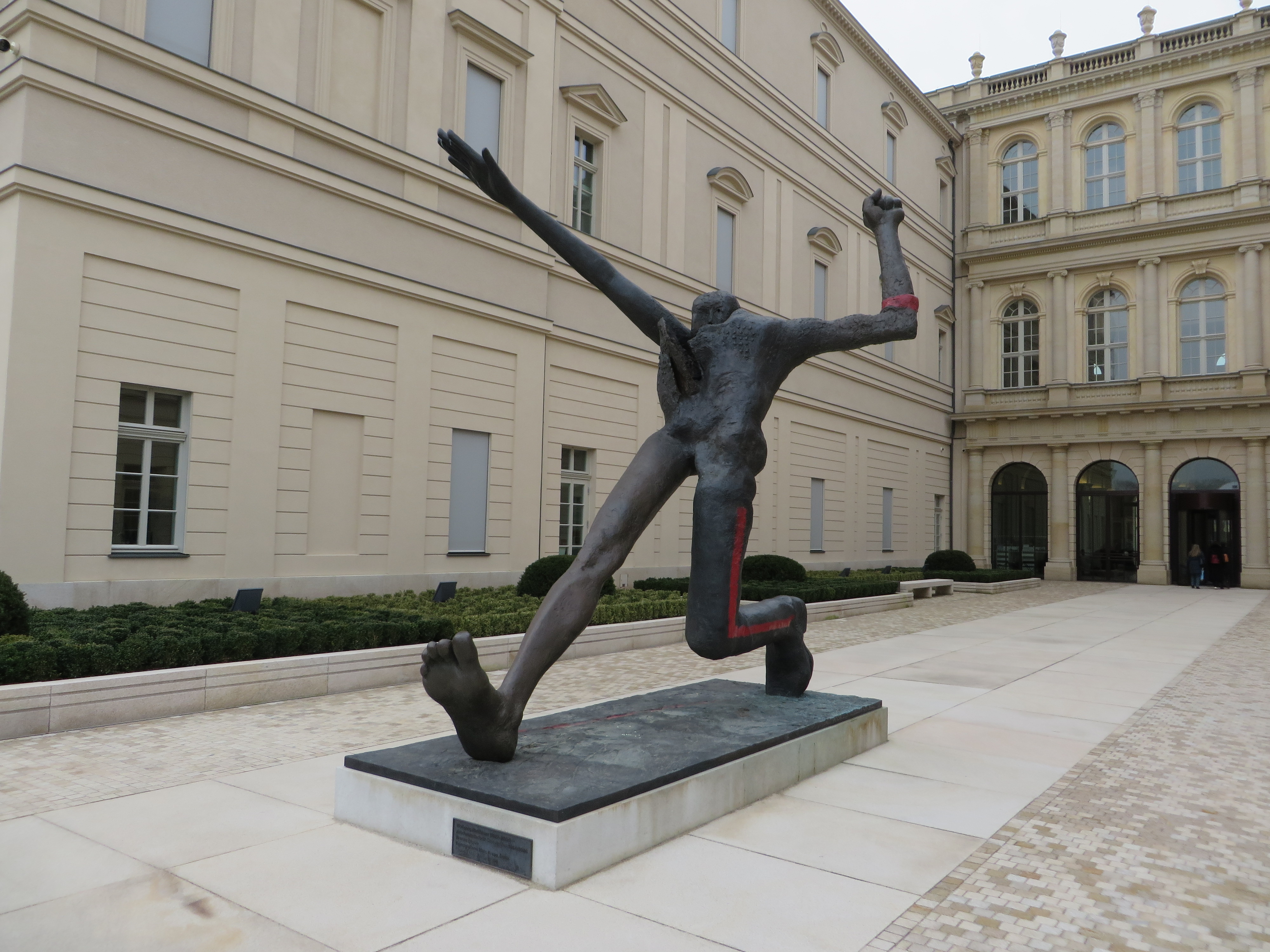
- Artist: Wolfgang Mattheuer
- Year: 1984
- Medium: Bronze
- Dimensions: 500 cm (200 in)
- Location: Museum Barberini, Potsdam, Germany

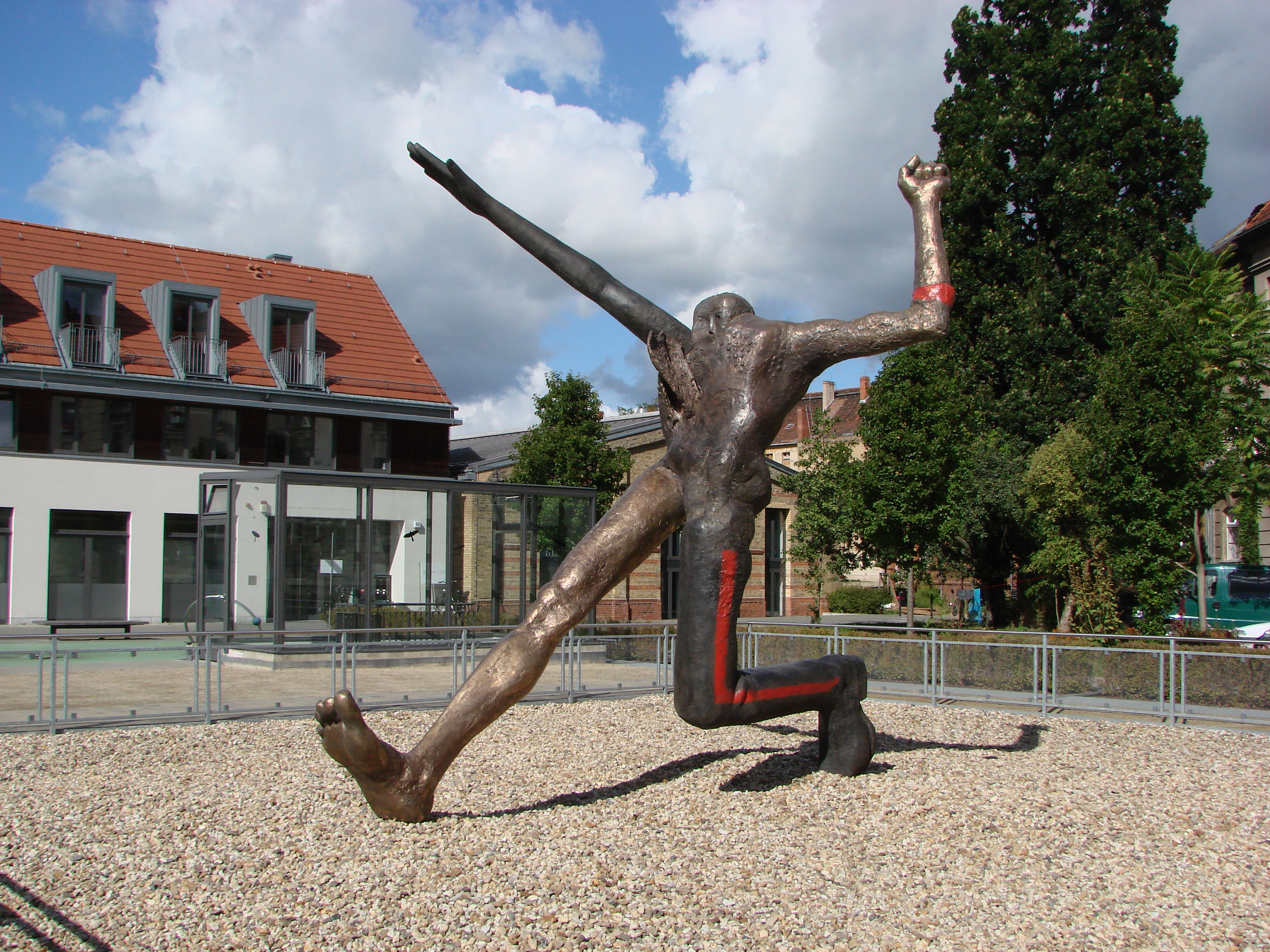
The same sculpture in its former location, the courtyard of the carriage stable (Kutschpferdestall) in Potsdam

The Step of the Century (in German: Jahrhundertschritt) is a bronze sculpture that was created by Wolfgang Mattheuer in 1984. It is considered one of the most important works of art in the GDR at the time of the division of Germany and is a parable of the turmoil of the 20th century.

== Description and interpretation ==
=== Motif development ===
Wolfgang Mattheuer's work includes paintings, works on paper, prints and, since 1970, sculptures and objects. The majority of his pictures are so-called recreational pictures and include still lifes, portraits and landscapes. The so-called problem images gained greater importance: In them, Mattheuer takes up mythological, biblical, contemporary and metaphorical motifs, combines them, expands their context and uses these images to create astute, sometimes cynical comments on current events. Well-known examples of this are his pictures of the fratricide of Cain and Abel, the Icarus figures, those fleeing and falling, one of his best-known pictures is Hinter den sieben Bergen (Behind the Seven Mountains). Mattheuer repeatedly addresses man's split between good and evil, between “greatness and misery” (Blaise Pascal).

In the 1980s, Mattheuer was to develop what, in retrospect, was the most significant parable for his entire work, his own mythological figure – the Step of the Century. In fact, this tearing apart figure is already present in its basic dialectical idea in Mattheuer's earliest pictures. In the painting Aggression (1981), this ominous figure appears for the first time in the painting's work: the body appears squat and deformed, the head is tucked in behind the torn chest and can hardly be seen. It consists only of the extremities - one arm, stretched out in the Nazi salute, finds its counterweight in the red-marked leg stuck in the soldier's boot, the other, left arm is clenched into a communist fist, the right leg stomps forward, naked and sweeping. The following are pictures with the titles Nightmare (Alptraum, 1982) and Lost Middle (Verlorene Mitte, 1982). Mattheuer writes about this figure:

A bare leg, reaching wide. A boot leg, a black arm with a Nazi salute shooting from the disembodied middle and a fist on the raised second arm turn four extremities into a racing figure. […] What is that? Helpless rage? […] Chaos? Resurrection? Martial law? Loss of center!

— Wolfgang Mattheuer

In the garden of his Reichenbach house, Mattheuer works on the sculptural realization of the figure, which was planned from the beginning. In 1984, the 2.5 m (8.2 ft) tall plaster model was completed - casts in iron and bronze followed and finally a 5 m (16 ft) tall example, which is now in the Museum Barberini.

=== Reception ===
In 1985 the painted plaster version was publicly exhibited for the first time at the 11. Leipziger Bezirkskunstausstellung (11th Bezirk Leipzig Art Exhibition). The State Gallery Moritzburg in Halle and the collector Peter Ludwig each commissioned a bronze casting. The audience reacted with astonishment and a lot of sympathy to the work shown. The response was even greater a few years later when a bronze cast of the Step of the Century was shown at the Xth and last Kunstausstellung der DDR (art exhibition of the GDR) in Dresden. The figure was chosen as the most important work of art in the exhibition, especially because a political discourse was still conducted as an alternative through visual art and literature.

Mattheuer said about his sculpture: "This nightmare figure, as the embodiment of absurdity, is 'that conflict between the longing mind and the disappointing world', it is '... homesickness for unity, this fragmented universe, and the contradiction that connects both' (Albert Camus) and which all too often erupts into aggression and destructiveness, as a centrifugal force that tears the individual apart. No attempt at self-discovery is successful anymore." Eduard Beaucamp, long-time feature writer for Die Zeit and advocate of the Leipzig School artists in particular, writes: "This paradoxical metaphor of the century, an aggressive, fleeing end-time figure who has lost his body and his 'center' is a mocking, bitter swan song for modern dictatorships.”

The message of the Step of the Century was also recognized in the then West Germany. In 1988, the exhibition Zeitvergleich '88 - 13 Painters from the GDR' brought together a whole series of paintings and sculptural works by well-known GDR artists, including Mattheuer's Step of the Century. A journalist judges: “The symbol of the exhibition, […] is a single bronze sculpture. Richly placed on the threshold between the two rooms, Wolfgang Mattheuer's Step of the Century from 1984 creates the leap from east to west."

== Locations ==
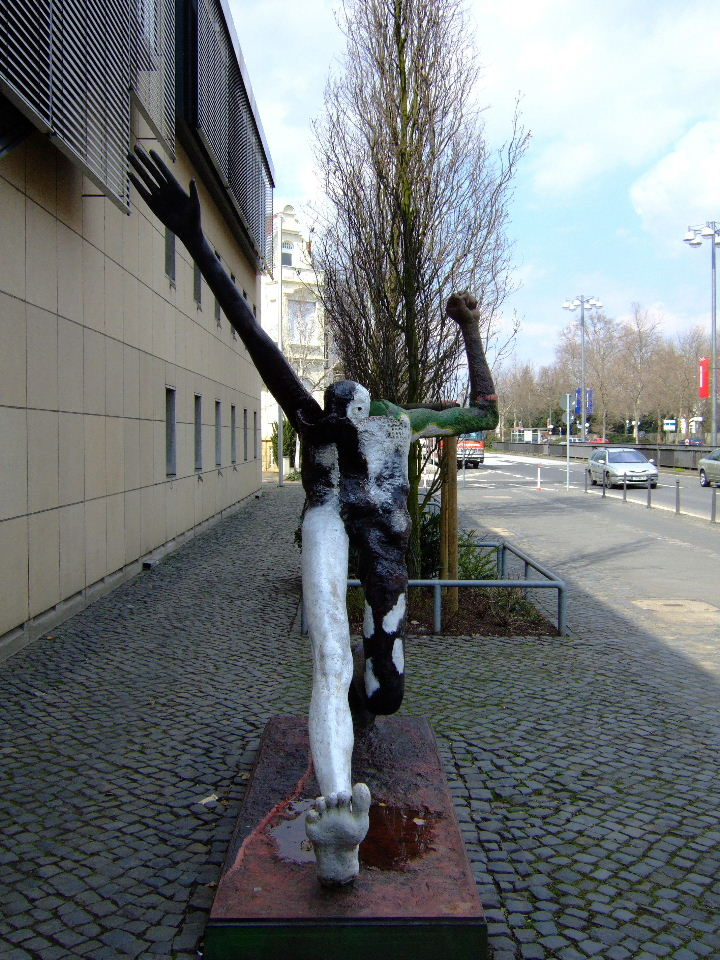
Step of the Century: iron cast in front of the Haus der Geschichte in Bonn

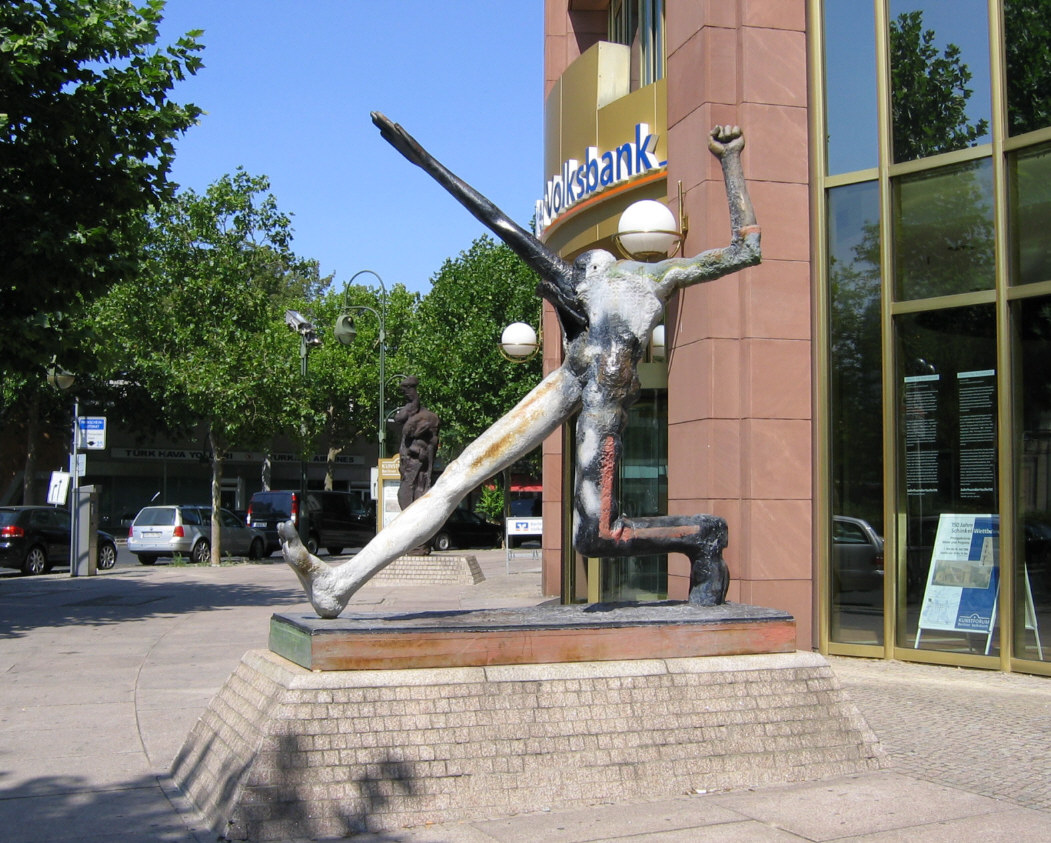
Iron cast at the old location in front of the GrundkreditBank (now Berliner Volksbank) in Berlin

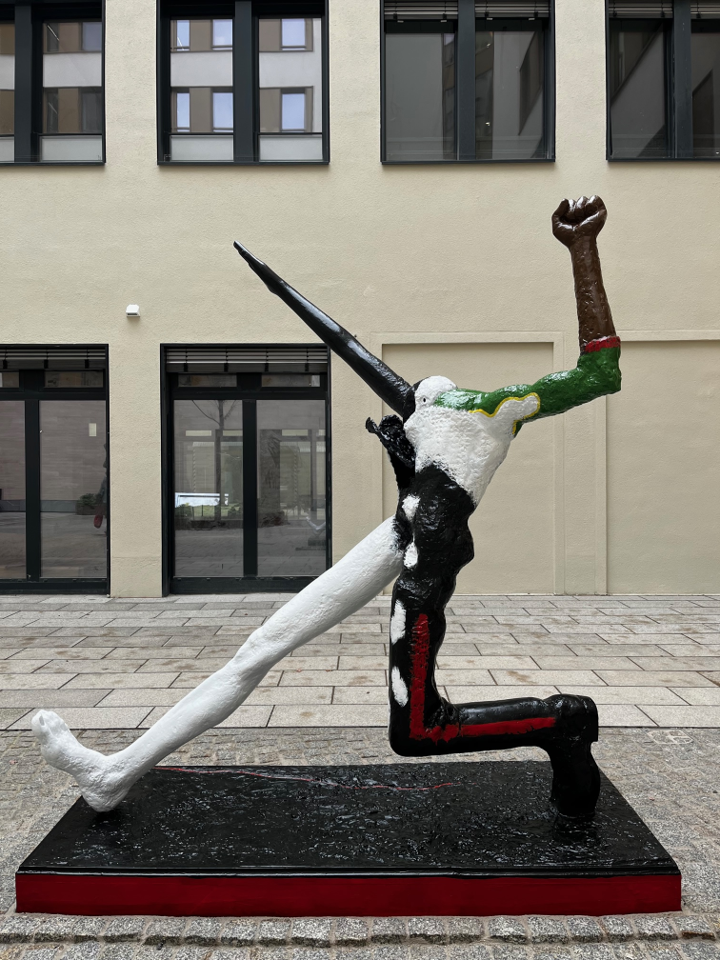
Century step, iron cast painted in the inner courtyard of the Berliner Volksbank headquarters (QVB), Bundesallee 206, Berlin

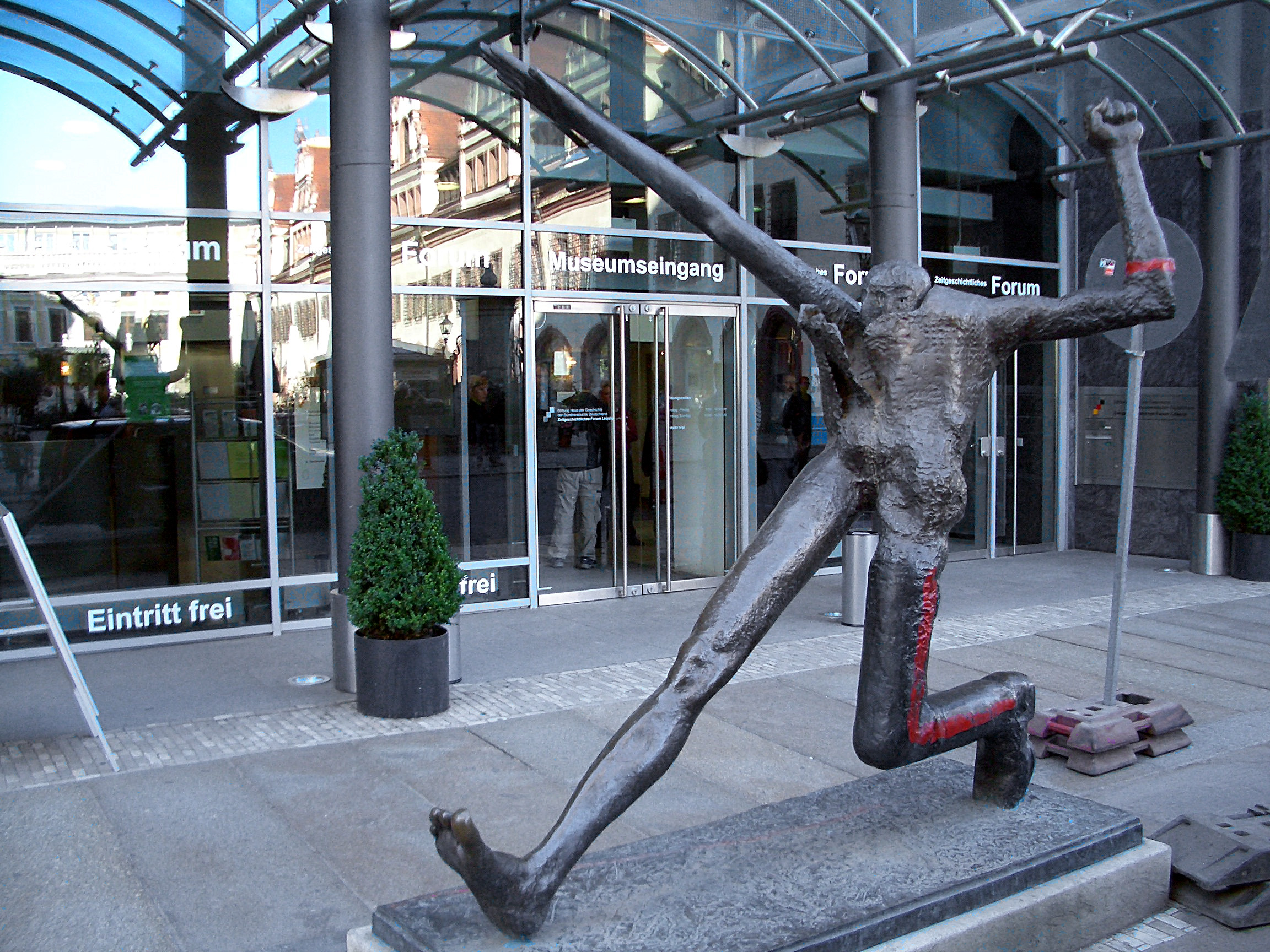
Bronze cast in front of the Zeitgeschichtliches Forum Leipzig

The catalog raisonné of sculptures and objects includes two differently painted iron casts and four bronze casts. Of these, three are painted differently and one is unpainted. Their locations are:

- Berliner Volksbank, QVB headquarters, Bundesallee 206, Berlin (iron, painted)
- Haus der Geschichte, Bonn (iron, painted)
- Ludwiggalerie Oberhausen Castle (bronze, painted)
- Moritzburg Foundation – Art Museum of the State of Saxony-Anhalt, Halle an der Saale (bronze, painted)
- Zeitgeschichtliches Forum Leipzig, Grimmaische Strasse, (bronze, painted)
- Solbrigplatz, Reichenbach im Vogtland (bronze, unpainted)

In October 2017, the city council of Reichenbach in Vogtland decided to purchase the last unsold example (bronze, unpainted) and put it up publicly. The purchase price was €180,000 and was largely financed through donations. The installation took place in November 2020.

The Step of the Century became a landmark of the House of History Foundation of the Federal Republic of Germany. At the Bonn and Leipzig locations, 2.5 m (8.2 ft) tall bronze casts mark the entrance to the foundation's exhibition halls. At the end of the 1990s, Hermann Schäfer, then director of the Haus der Geschichte in Bonn, won Mattheuer over to the idea of making a 5 m (16 ft) tall bronze cast of the Step of the Century. The idea of setting it up in front of the Zeitgeschichtliches Forum building in Leipzig could not be realized due to lack of space. The plan to install the sculpture in front of the Reichstag building in Berlin also failed.

In 2012, SAP founder and art patron Hasso Plattner acquired the work from Wolfgang Mattheuer's estate. For some time it was placed in the courtyard of the House of Brandenburg-Prussian History in Potsdam (Haus der brandenburgisch-preußischen Geschichte), before it found its current location in the courtyard of the Museum Barberini in Potsdam in June 2016.
