= Grimmaische Strasse =

Street in Leipzig, Germany

Coordinates: 51.33982°N 12.37666°E

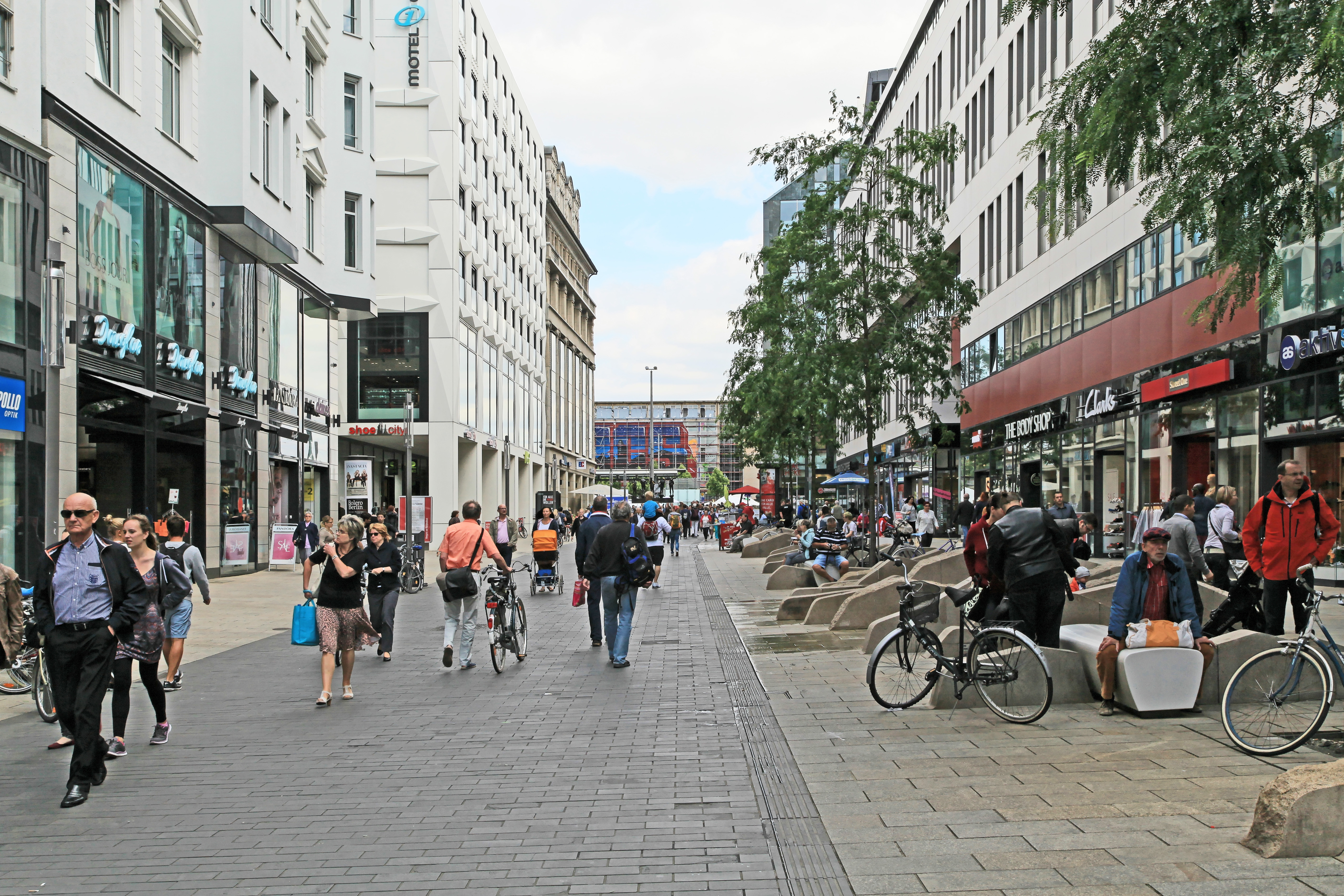
- Grimmaische Strasse, eastern area, 2015
- Interactive map of Grimmaische Strasse
- Former name: Grimmaische Gasse
- Length: 333 m (1,093 ft)
- Location: Leipzig-Mitte, Leipzig, Germany
- Postal code: 04109
- Nearest metro station: Leipzig Markt station of S-Bahn Mitteldeutschland and tram interchange station at Augustusplatz
- West end: Markt
- East end: Goethestrasse / Augustusplatz

Construction
- Completion: created in the middle ages, newly designed 2010

Grimmaische Strasse is a street in Leipzig, borough Leipzig-Mitte, and connects the marketplace with Augustusplatz. It was named in 1839 after the Grimma Gate (Grimmaisches Tor), the gateway to Grimma, which was first mentioned in 1421. Before that it was called Grimmaische Gasse and was the main street of the Grimma quarter (German: Grimmaisches Viertel). Today it is a heavily frequented pedestrian zone in a prime location with department stores, shops, restaurants, hotels, a museum and the university as located on the street.

== Location and description ==
=== Location in the urban area ===
Location of Grimmaische Strasse as a central east–west connection within the inner city ring

Grimmaische Strasse (official street code 01017) is located within the inner city ring and leads from the market, which is seen as the center of the city, in an easterly direction, not completely straight, but slightly curved to the southeast. Seen from the market, it initially runs along the Naschmarkt, which is adjacent to the north. Opposite this on the southern side of the street is a building complex with a system of arcade galleries, including the Mädler Arcade Gallery with Auerbach's cellar. Continuing east, Grimmaische Strasse first crosses an intersection with a street called Neumarkt to the south and Reichsstrasse to the north and then an intersection with Universitätstrasse to the south and Nikolaistrasse to the north. The adjoining eastern part of Grimmaische Strasse is dominated on the south side by the university campus, which was newly built in the mid-2000s. The development is now back on the old building line, which means that the street widening of the 1970s has been reduced by up to 25 m (82.0 ft). In keeping with the character of a commercial street and the development on the north side, there are also shops on the ground floor of the university buildings on the south side. Before reaching Augustusplatz, Ritterstrasse flows in from the north. The junction with Augustusplatz is spatially framed by a new building to replace Café Felsche on the area where the Grimmaische Tor formerly stood. Beyond Augustusplatz, Grimmaische Strasse continues in Grimmaischer Steinweg.

=== Design of the street space ===
The road surface was renovated and redesigned in two construction phases from 2007 to 2010, the second construction phase in the east immediately following the university's building construction work. The area in front of the institute building of the Faculty of Economics, which was completed in 2009, was provided with a “stone landscape” with two integrated water features. The design by the treibhaus landschaftsarchitektur office was selected and implemented as part of an expert review process with the participation of a children's jury. There are no other installations in the street, which is designed as a pedestrian zone, apart from the two objects of public art "The Step of the Century" by Wolfgang Mattheuer (1927–2004) in front of the Zeitgeschichtliches Forum Leipzig and "Untimely Contemporaries" by Bernd Göbel (* 1942) near the eastern end of the street.

Public Art

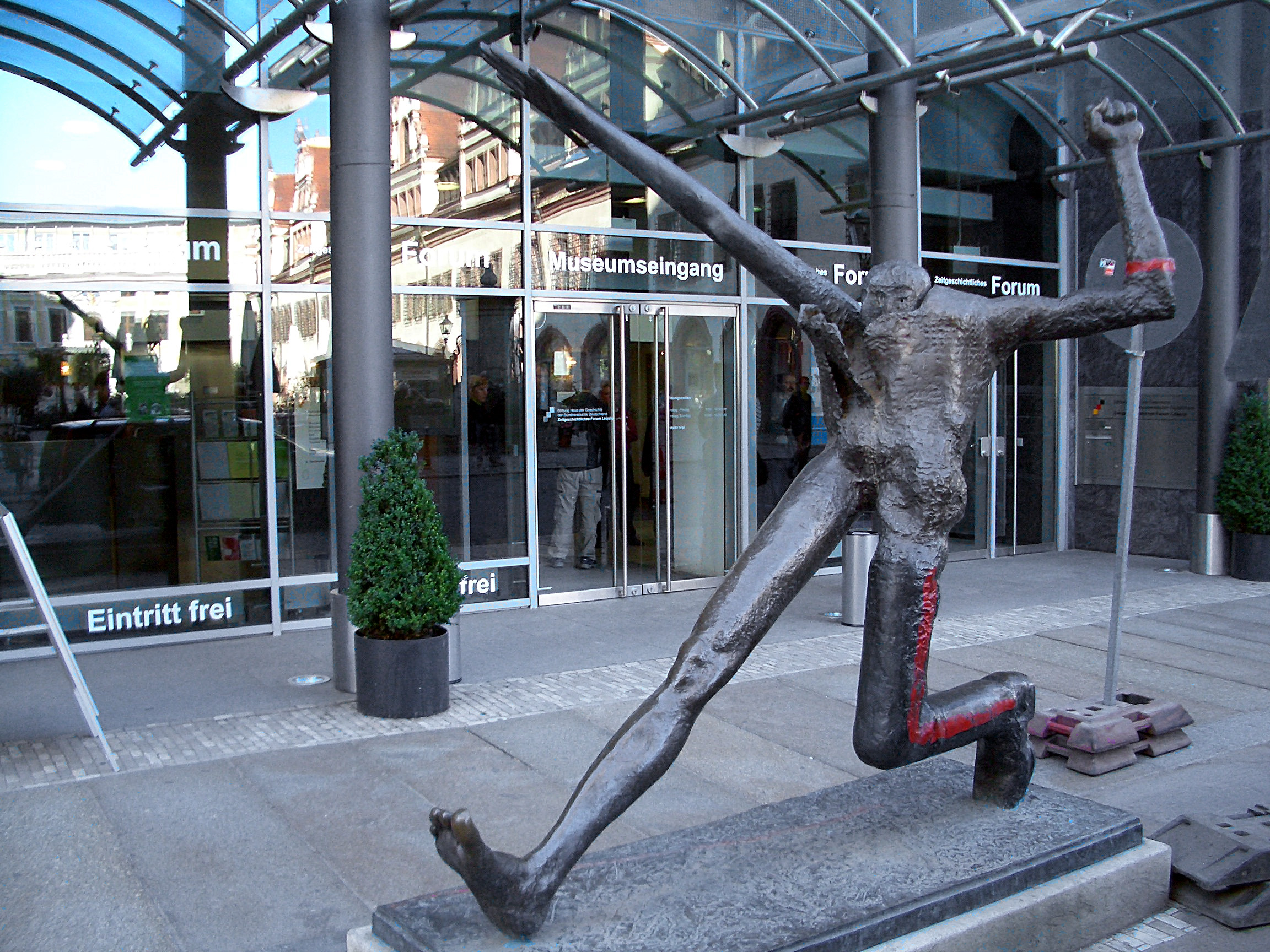
Sculpture „The Step of the Century“ (2005)

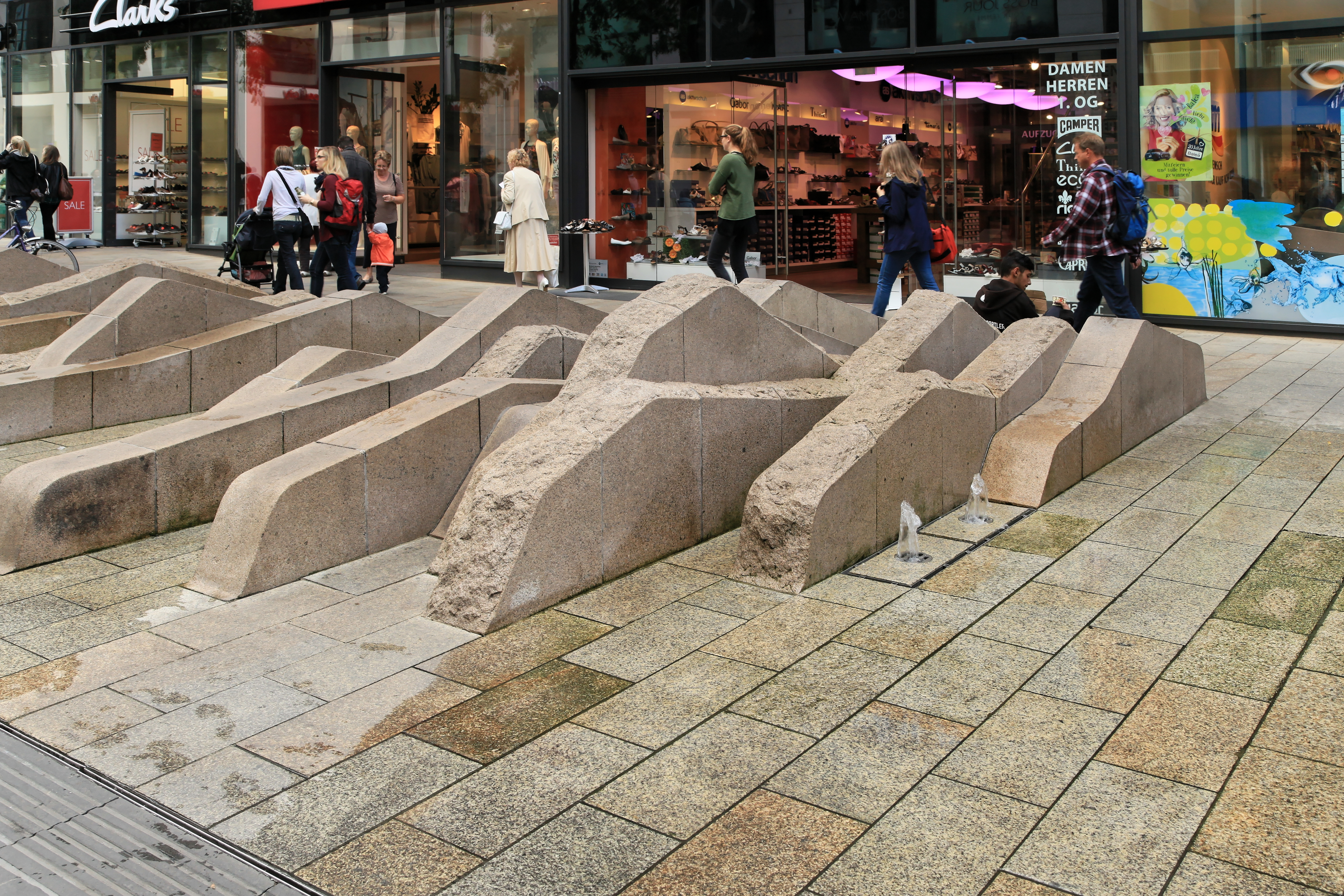
Water feature „Playing on the path“ (2015)

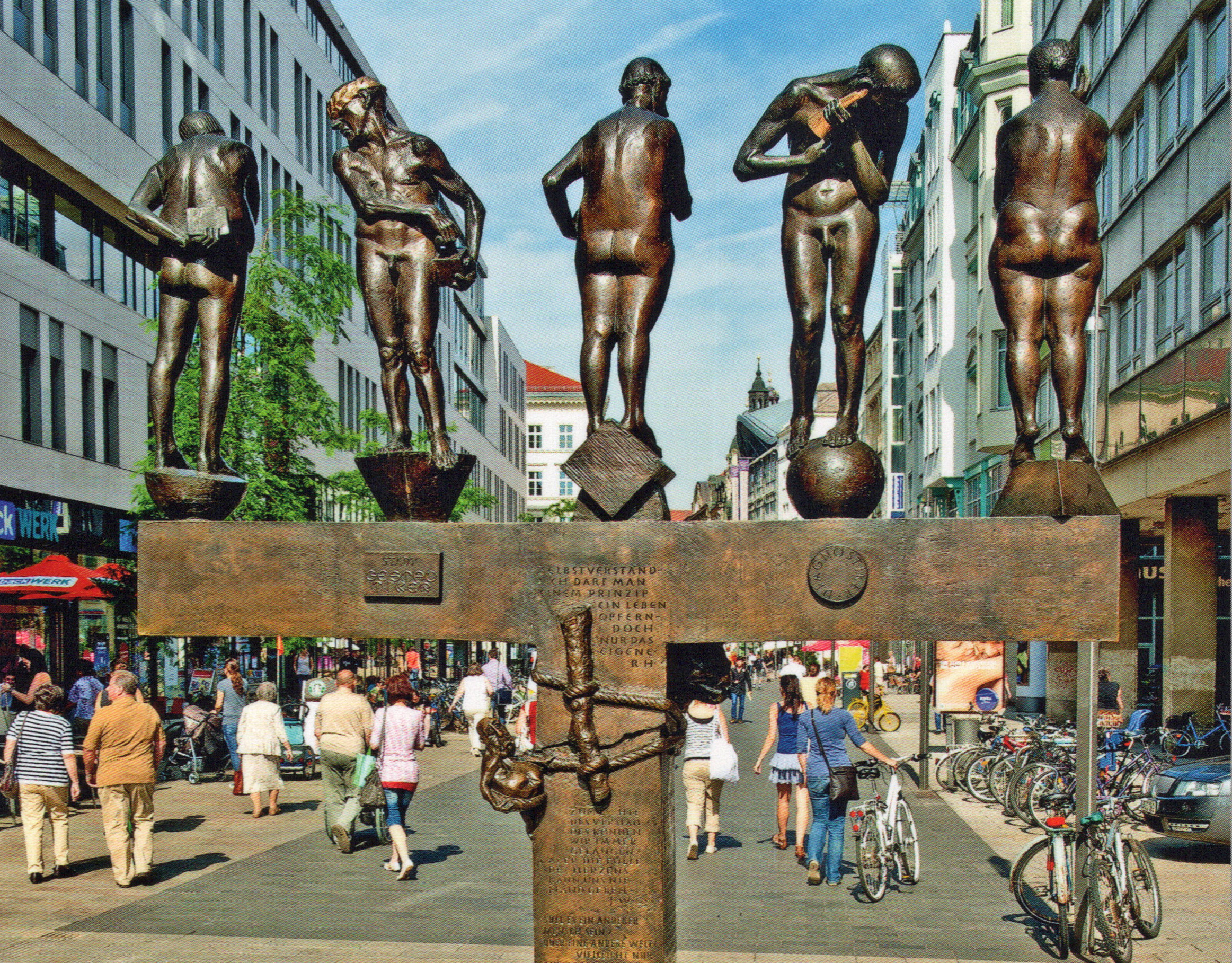
Sculpture "Untimely Contemporaries" (2012)

=== Public transport ===
Grimmaische Strasse can be reached by public transport via the tram stops at Augustusplatz in the east and the underground S-Bahn station Markt in the west. There has been no tram running directly on Grimmaische Strasse since 1951.

== History ==
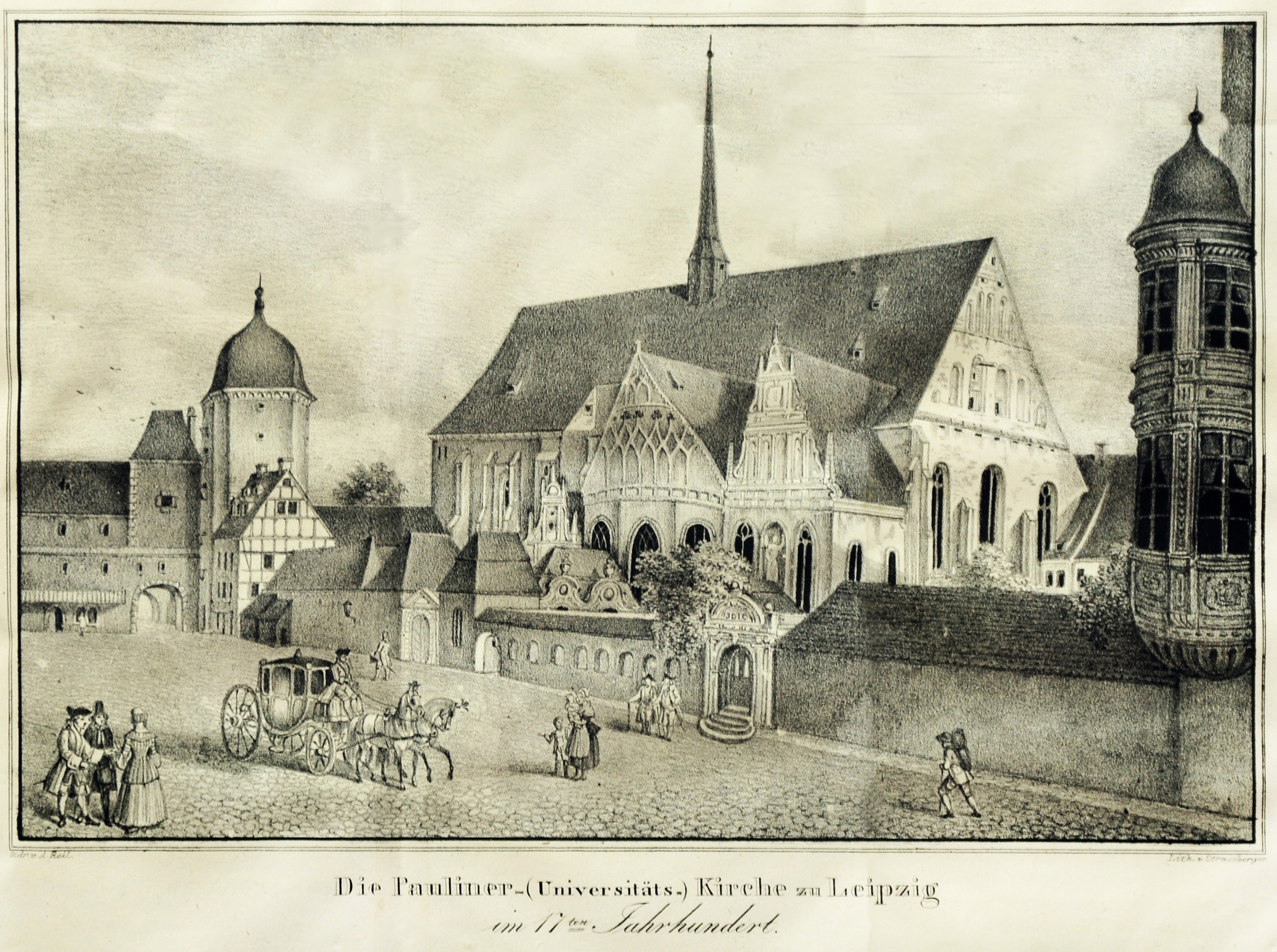
Eastern end of Grimmaische Strasse in the 17th century with the Paulinerkirche and the entrance to the Botanical Garden. On the left the Grimma Gate, on the right the oriel window of the Fürstenhaus

Since the Middle Ages, Grimmaische Strasse, previously Grimmaische Gasse, was part of the inner-city route of the historic road Via Regia, which crossed Leipzig as a trade and military road. It was also the main street of the Grimma Quarter, one of the four quarters in the old town of Leipzig. Its function as a trade route is also clear from the fact that the St. Nicholas Church is very close to the street. St. Nicholas was considered the patron saint of, among other things, travelers and traders. The second church in the area around Grimmaische Strasse was the Paulinerkirche, which was located directly on the eastern section of the city wall with the Grimmaische Tor. The Grimma Gate was reinforced with a defensive tower, which later became the municipal debtors' prison tower.

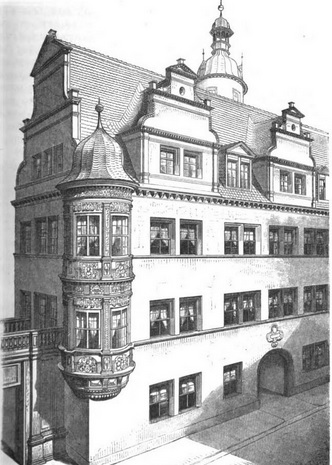
The Fürstenhaus in 1872, today diagonally opposite the new building at Grimmaische Strasse 17, a copy of the eastern oriel window of the house that was destroyed in 1943

Long-distance trade with Eastern Europe ran through the Grimma Gate and the Grimmaische Strasse. The fur trade had enormous economic importance for the Leipzig Trade Fair. The transports from Silesia (Breslau), Kiev and Moscow rolled via Görlitz via Grimmaische Strasse to the Markt or to the Brühl street for processing and sale. Other raw materials such as copper, silver, wood, wool, cloth, leather and livestock also came from Eastern Europe. Trade to supply the city with food from the suburbs and villages to the east of the city also ran along this road. Profiting primarily from long-distance trade, there were restaurants and hostels on Grimmaische Strasse. The houses were mostly still half-timbered. An exception was the stone-made Fürstenhaus built in 1558 by master builder Paul Widemann († 1568) for the councilor Georg Roth († 1594) on the corner of today's Universitätsstrasse. When the royal family came to the university in 1658, the university re-established its botanical garden on the property, which had previously been located in the former herb garden of the Dominican monastery. The Botanical Garden was now accessible to everyone, making it the first public green space in the city center.

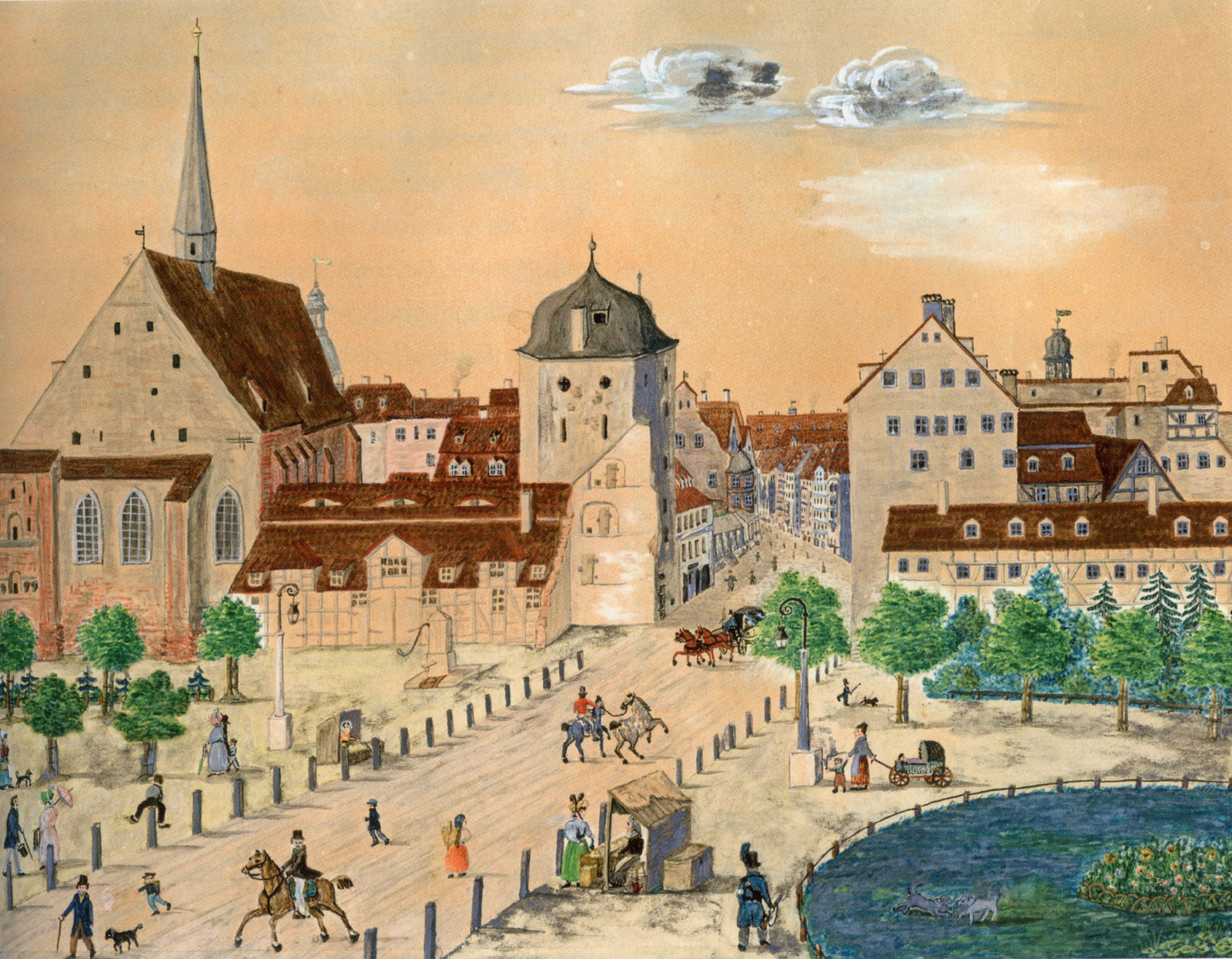
View from Augustusplatz towards the city in 1831: The Grimma Gate has been demolished, the debt tower is still standing

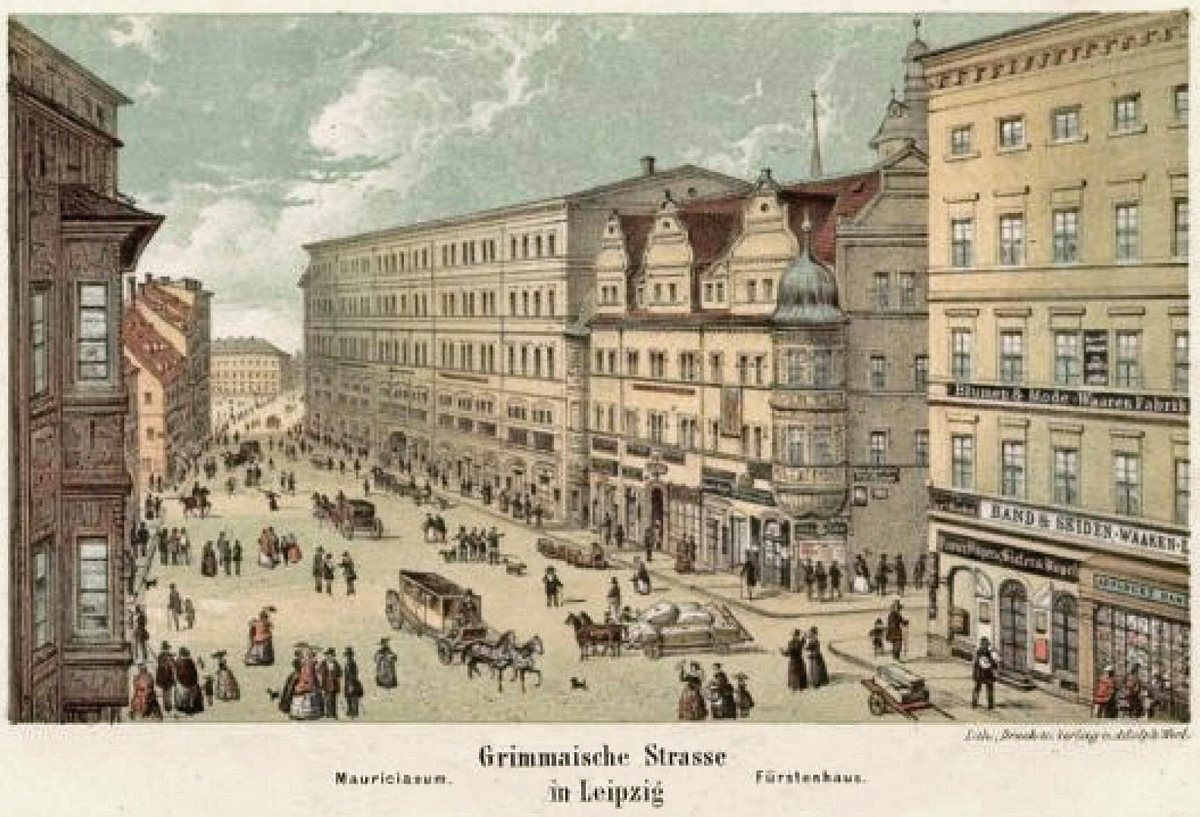
Grimmaische Strasse around 1850 with Mauricianum and Fürstenhaus

With the beginning of the slighting of the old town's fortifications after the Seven Years' War (1756–1763), which culminated in the demolition of the Grimmaische Tor in 1831 to make way for the Grimmaische Strasse, the character of the street also changed. As early as 1824, the abolition of the gate regulations had far-reaching consequences, as inner-city streets now had to face competition from the vorstadts. The hostels were replaced by the larger and more comfortable hotels outside the city center and some of them were demolished. Instead, merchants built commercial buildings. Grimmaische Straßsse mutated into a commercial street. The university also wanted to participate in this boom. In 1806 she moved the botanical garden to the area behind the Wasserkunst on the Pleisse mill ditch and had a one-story building with a narrow portico in front built between the Fürstenhaus and the Grimmaische Tor, the so-called ″colonnades″, the individual units of which were rented to merchants and craftsmen. The colonnades were replaced in 1849 by a four-story building designed by Albert Geutebrück (1801–1868), the Mauricianum, of which the ground floor and mezzanine were rented to businessmen.

From around the middle of the 19th century, as in the entire old town, a building boom began in Grimmaische Strasse, which intensified in the Gründerzeit. Because of its central location, the street was now an elegant address for town houses, shops and stores. At the same time as the transition to the concept of Mustermesse (Sample fair) took place, the first trade fair building along Grimmaische Strasse, the Reichshof, was built in 1898. This was followed by other trade fair palaces after the turn of the century.

On 4 May 2026, the street was the scene of a car attack.

== Development on the north side ==
Odd house numbers starting from the market

=== Grimmaische Strasse 1 to 7, Handelshof ===
The massive structure of the Handelshof was built between 1908 and 1909 as a trade fair palace, extends over an entire street block and, after its renovation in the early 2000s, houses shops and restaurants and, in the part of Salzgäßchen facing away from Grimmaische Strasse, a Steigenberger Grand Hotel.

=== Reichsstrasse 2 / Grimmaische Strasse, Reichshof ===
Also completed in 1898 as a trade fair palace, the Reichshof with neo-baroque decor has its address on Reichsstrasse, but was expanded in 1904 to include the property at Grimmaische Strasse 9 to 11 with an Art Nouveau building. Today it is a commercial building with an imposing corner with a lantern structure.

=== Grimmaische Strasse 13 / 15, Hansa House ===
Today's Hansa House with its arcade gallery to Specks Hof was also a trade fair palace since the beginning of the 20th century, which was hit by bombs in 1943 and rebuilt in 1958/59 and then again in 1997. It is now a commercial and office building.

=== Grimmaische Strasse 17, Oriel window of the Fürstenhaus ===
The oriel window of the old Fürstenhaus (Princely House) from the Saxon Renaissance period was attached as a copy to the new apartment building at Grimmaische Strasse 17 in 1986. The Fürstenhaus, which was destroyed in World War II, was located diagonally opposite on the corner of Grimmaische Strasse and Universitätsstrasse from 1558 to 1943.

=== Goethestrasse 1 / Grimmaische Strasse, Königsbau ===
The Königsbau (Royal Building) from the 1910s on the corner of Augustusplatz has the address Goethestrasse 1, but one side is on Grimmaische Strasse. It housed a department store that was set on fire during Kristallnacht in 1938.

Today (2023) there is a Targobank branch, shops and offices there.

Buildings on the north side

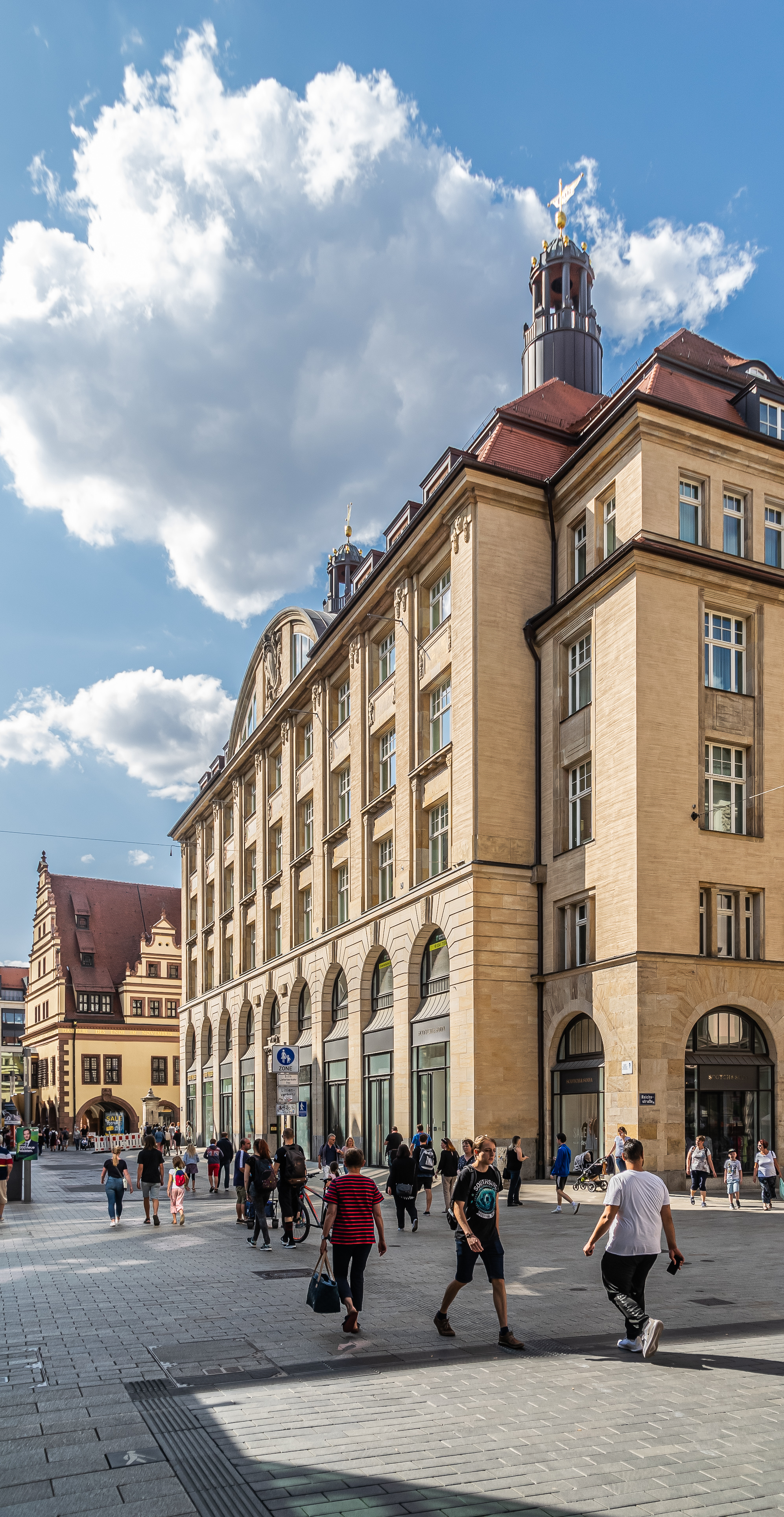
Handelshof and Grimmaische Strasse (2019)

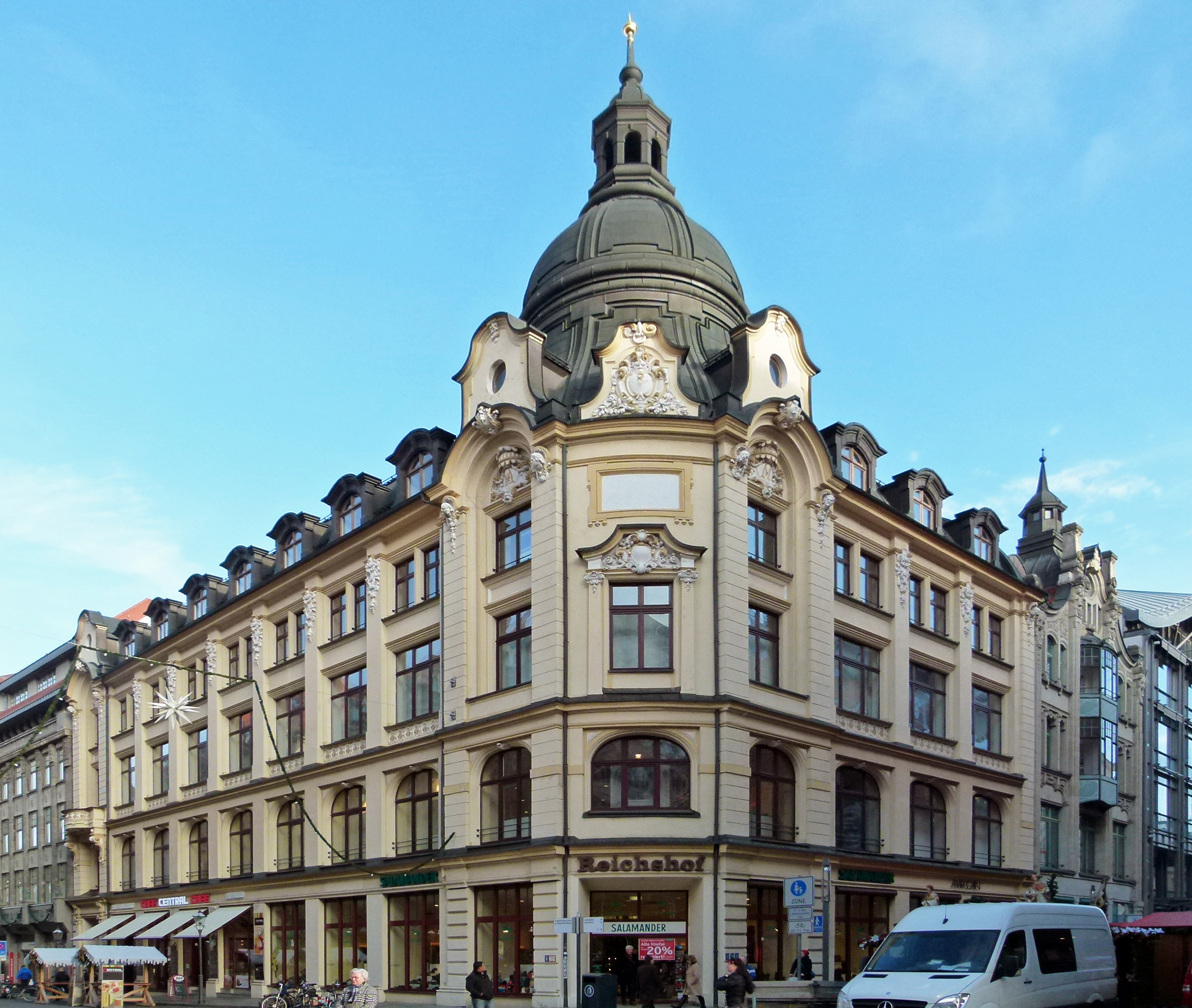
Reichshof, Grimmaische Strasse on the right (2012)

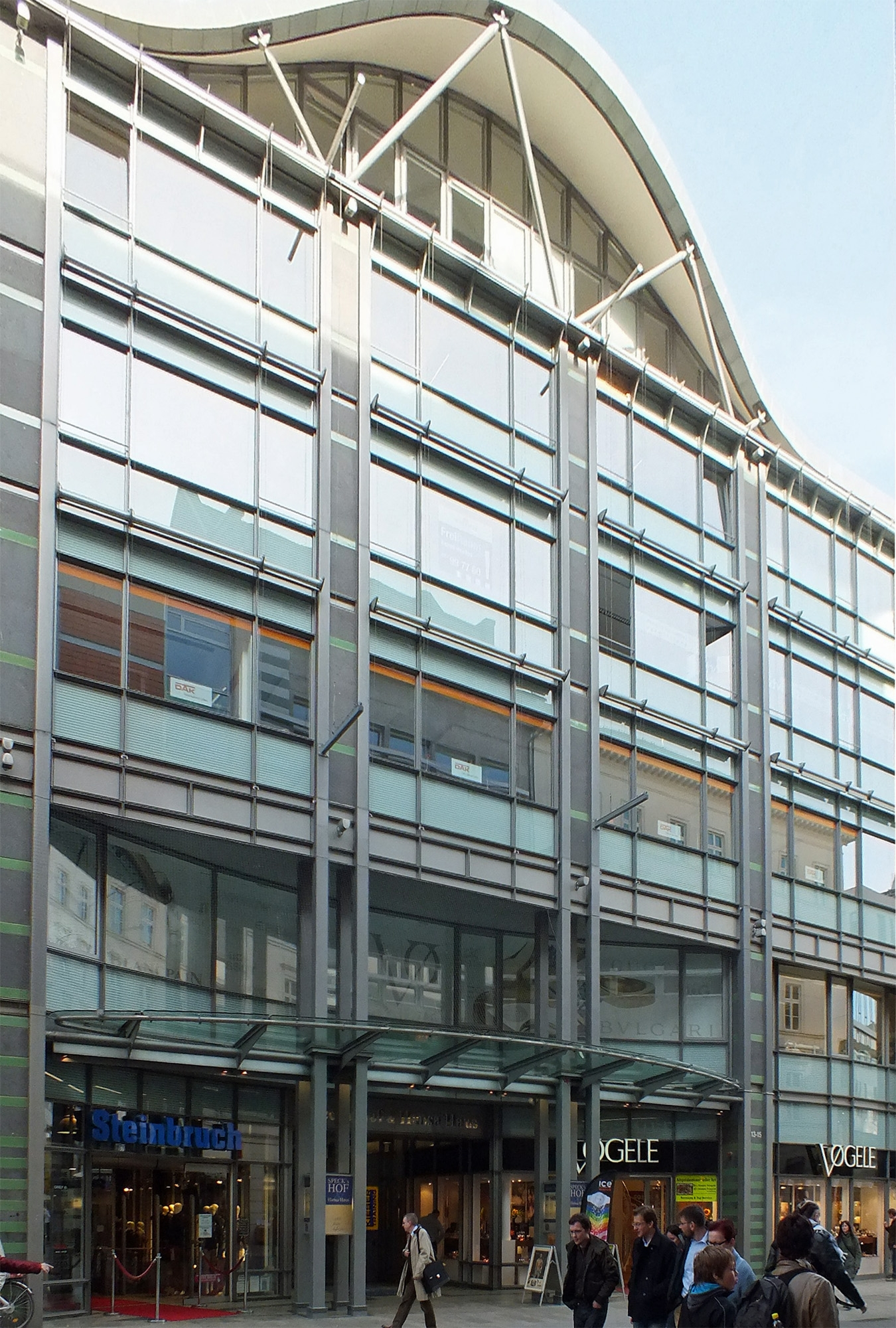
Hansa House (2011)

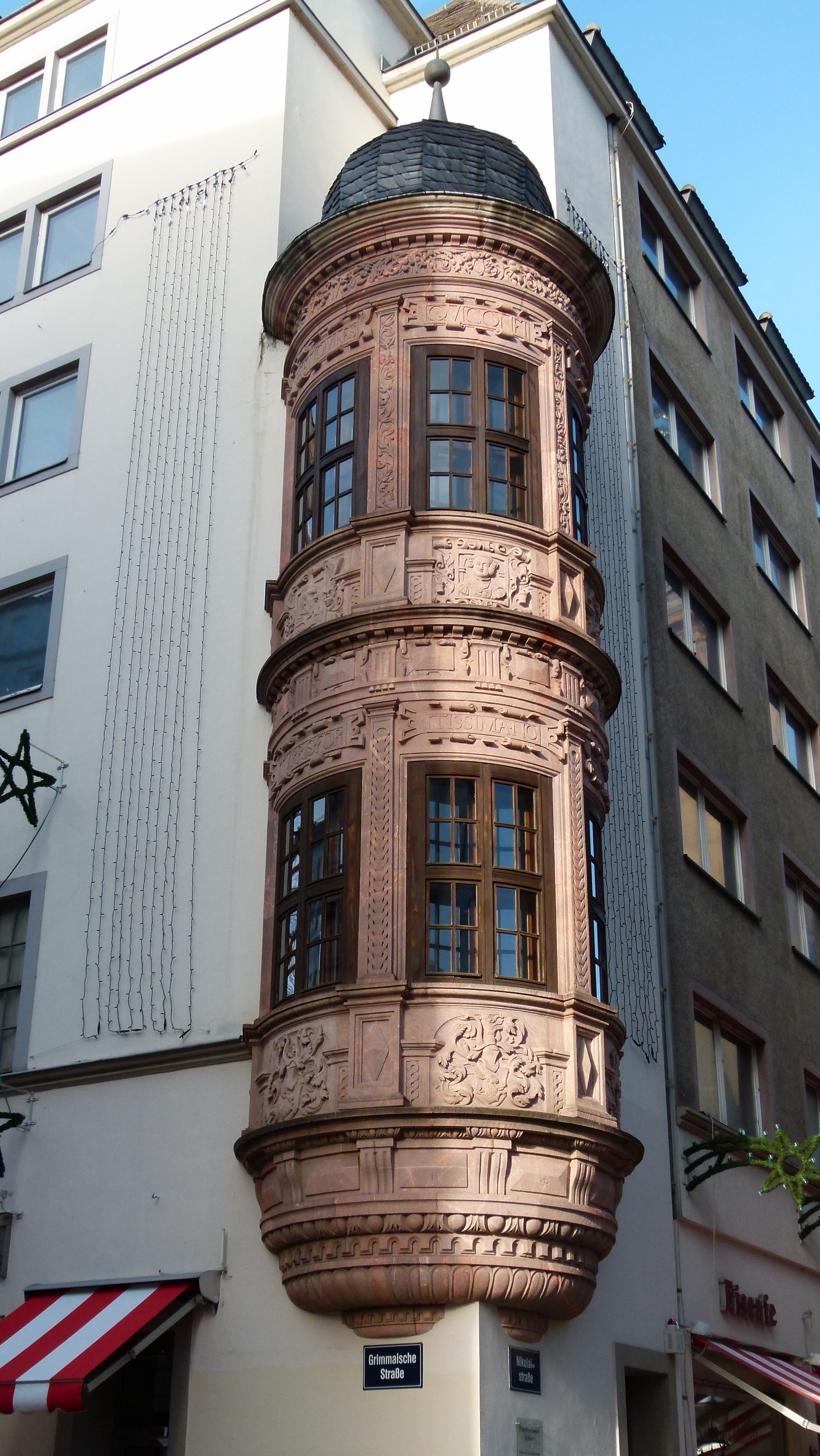
Grimmaische Strasse 17 with antique oriel window (2012)

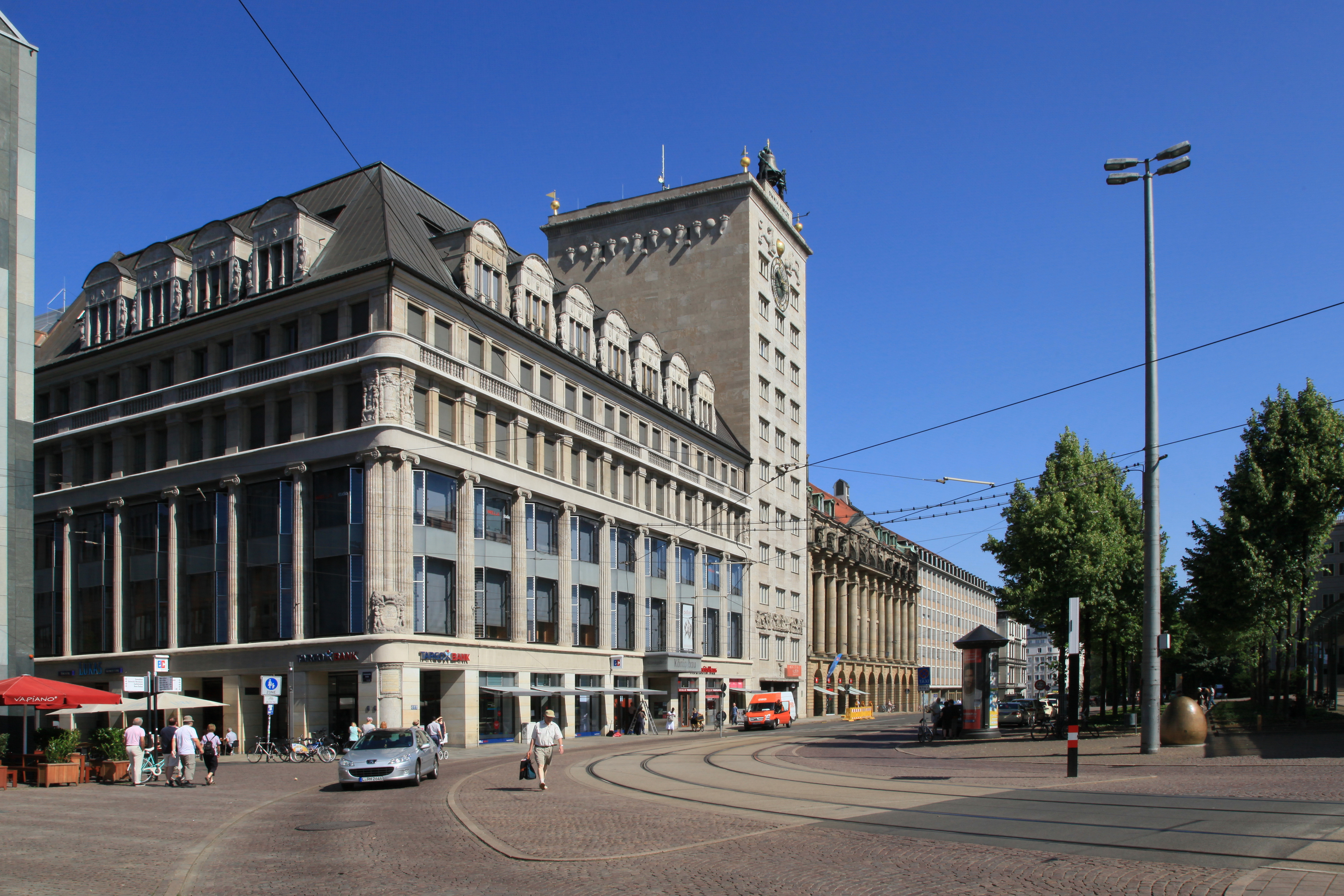
Königsbau on the corner of Grimmaische Strasse (left) / Goethestraße (right) (2015)

== Development on the south side ==
Straight house numbers starting from the market

=== Grimmaische Strasse 2 / 4, Mädler Arcade Gallery ===
The entrance to the Mädler Arcade Gallery (Mädlerpassage) (1912 to 1914) on Grimmaische Strasse is formed by a round arched portal that extends to the first floor. The building complex was associated with the trade fair in the 20th century before it was extensively renovated from 1995 to 1997 and continued to be used by shops and restaurants, including Auerbachs Keller.

=== Grimmaische Strasse 6–12, Zentralmessepalast ===
This building complex between Grimmaischer Strasse and Neumarkt includes not only the building with the high stepped gable in the Renaissance tradition (trade fair palace built from 1912 to 1914, rebuilt from 1996 to 1998), but also house number 6 with the Museum Zeitgeschichtliches Forum, a branch of the Haus der Geschichte (House of the History of the Federal Republic of Germany), which opened in 1999, as well as house number 8 with a sports department store.

=== Neumarkt 1 / Grimmaische Strasse, Galeria Kaufhof ===
The department store Galeria Kaufhof, which was newly built on a war-used waste site between 1999 and 2001, has the address Neumarkt 1, but its north side is on Grimmaische Strasse. After the company announced its closure at the beginning of 2023, it remained intact.

=== Grimmaische Strasse, institute building ===
For the 600th anniversary of the University of Leipzig in 2009, its inner city campus on Augustusplatz was redesigned. The new institute building of the Faculty of Economics was also rebuilt with a long facade and shops on Grimmaische Strasse.

=== Augustusplatz 11 / Grimmaische Straße, successor building to Café Felsche ===
For the Café Felsche (named Café français until 1914), which was destroyed in 1943, a successor building was built from 2008 to 2009, with a café run by the restaurateur Vapiano on the two lower floors

Buildings on the south side

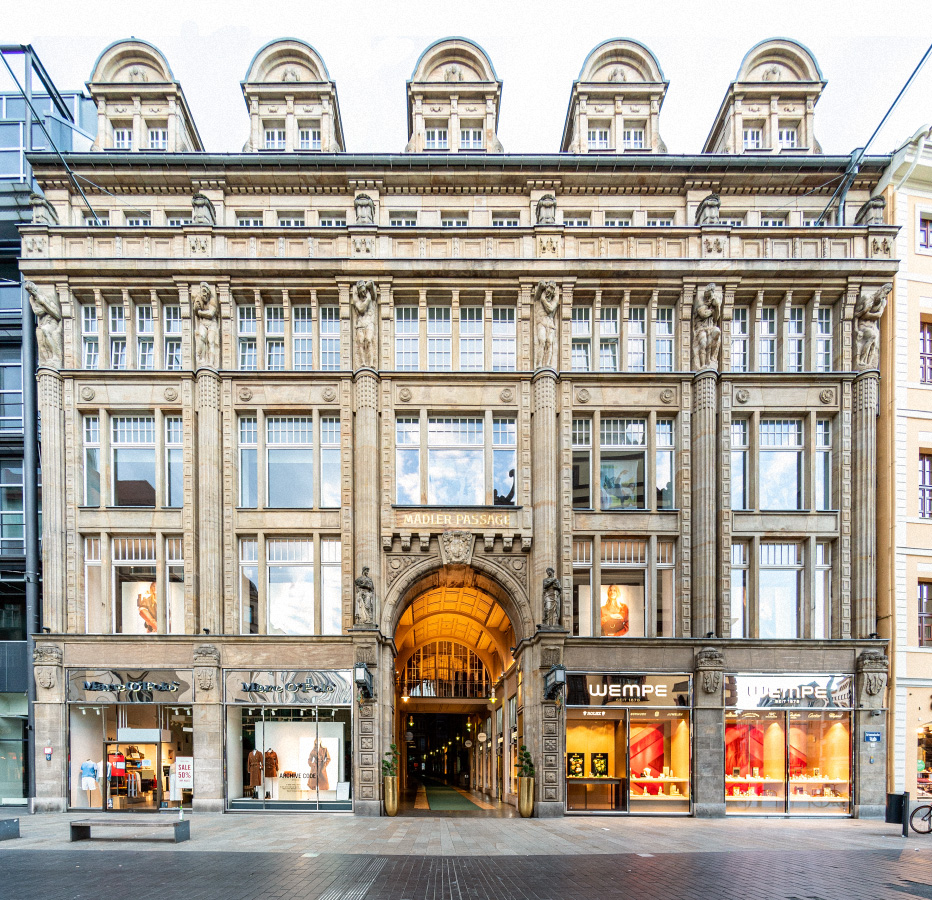
Grimmaische Strasse 2 / 4 with the entrance to the Mädler Arcade Gallery (2020)

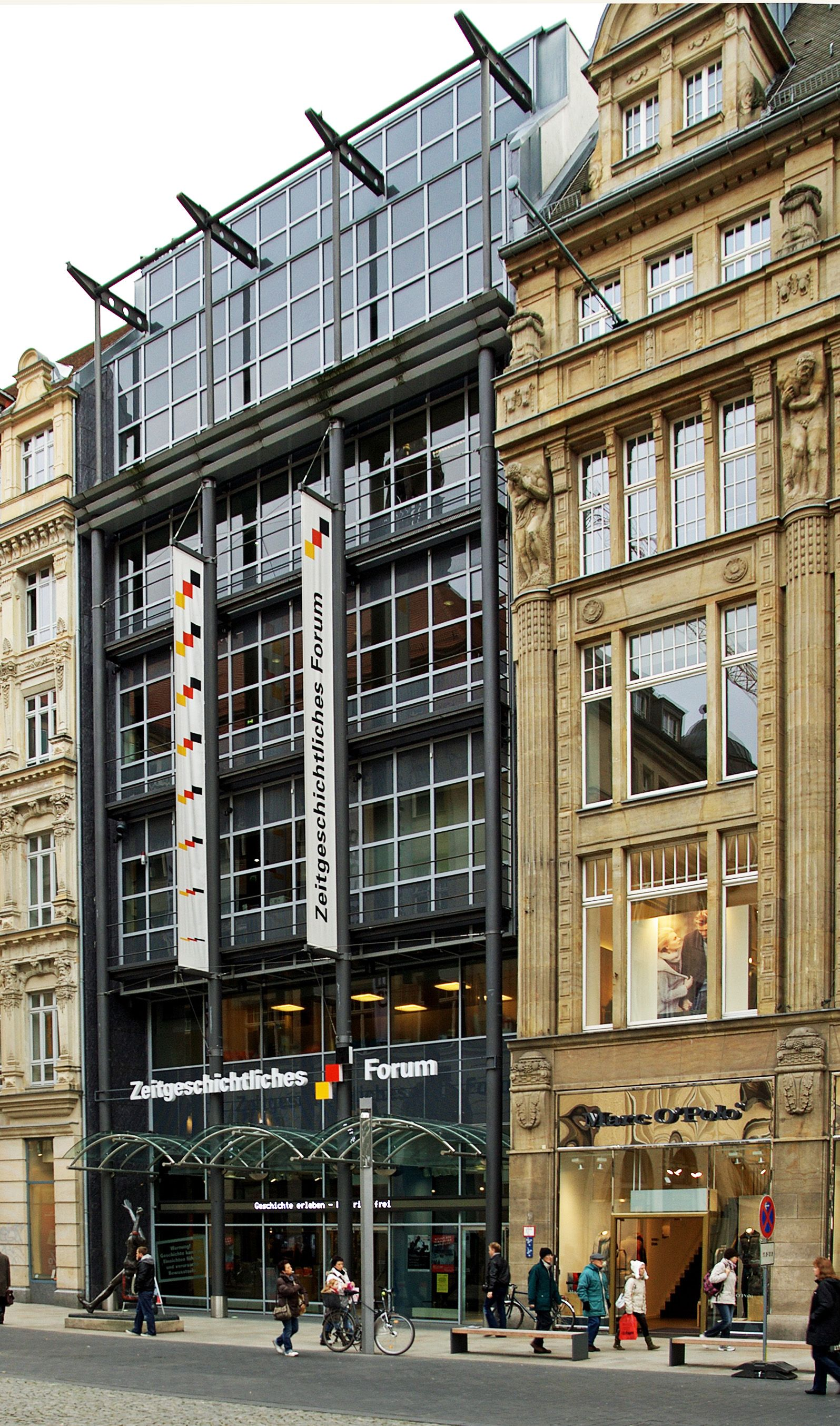
Zeitgeschichtliches Forum (2009)

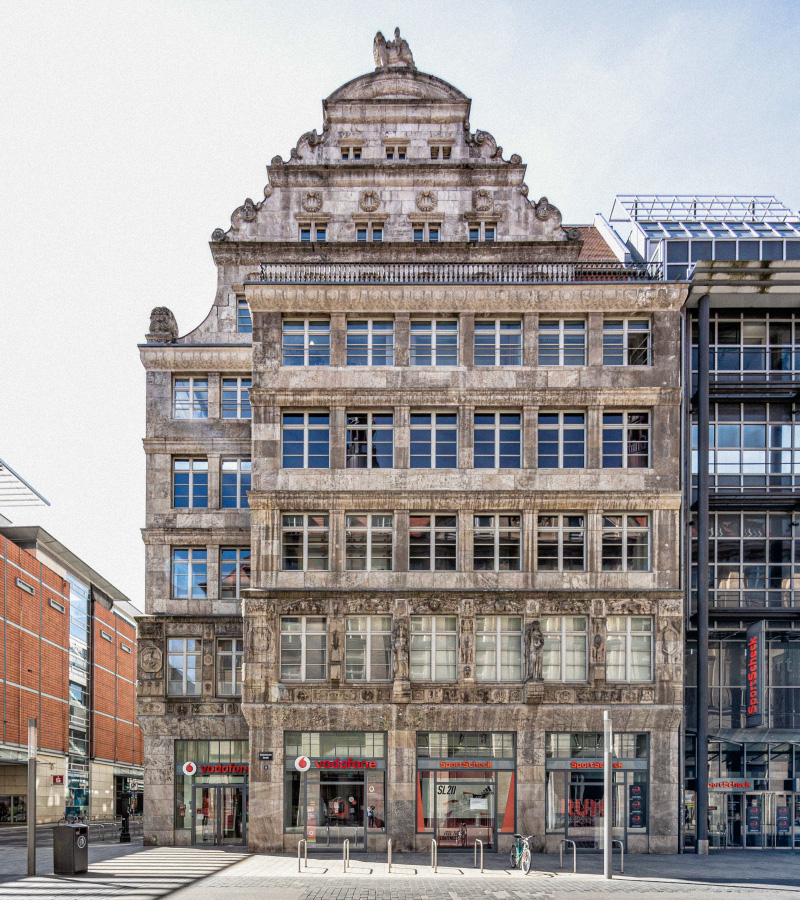
Zentralmessepalast (Central trade fair palace) (2020)

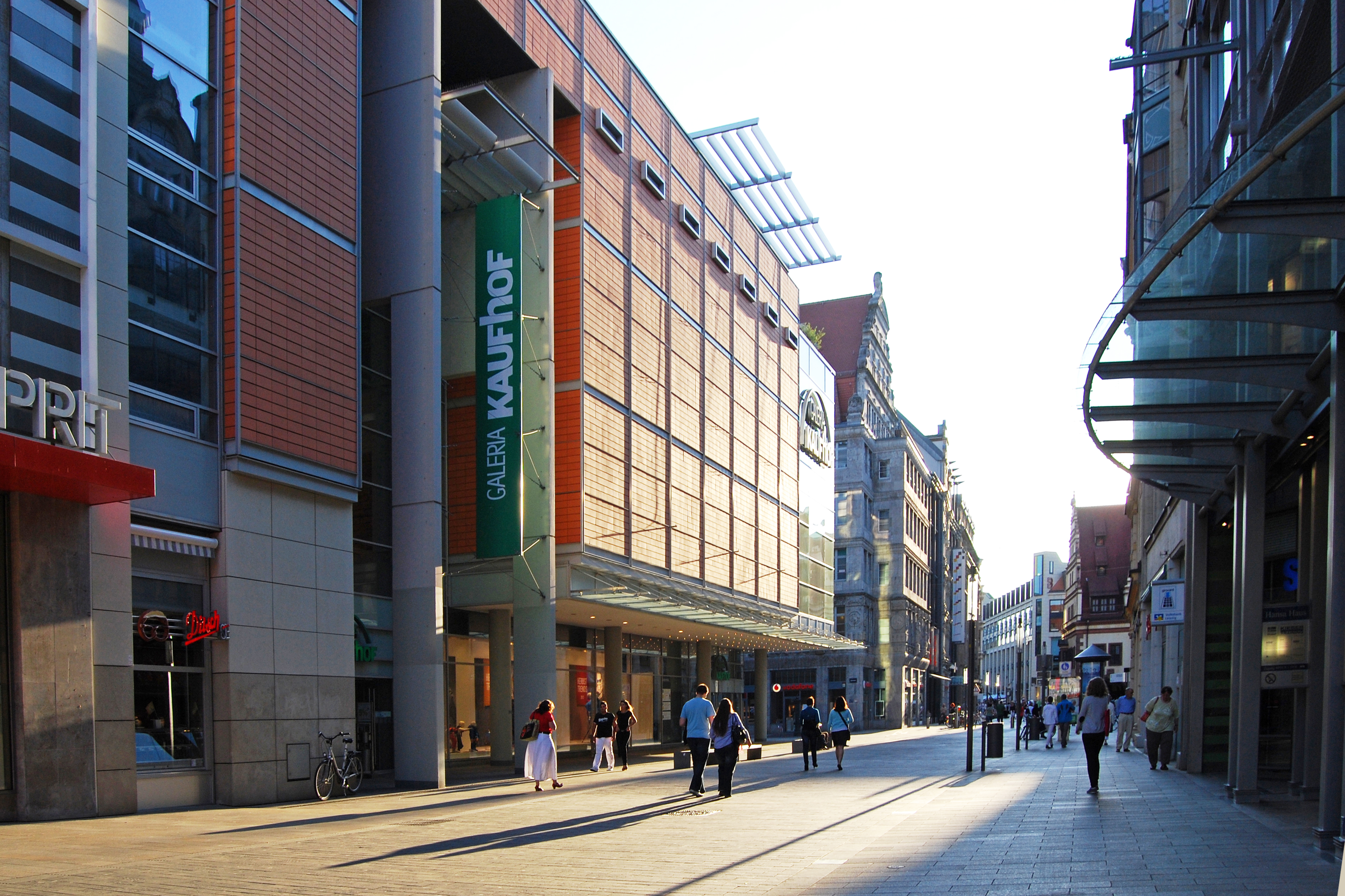
Galeria Kaufhof in the Grimmaische Strasse (2012)

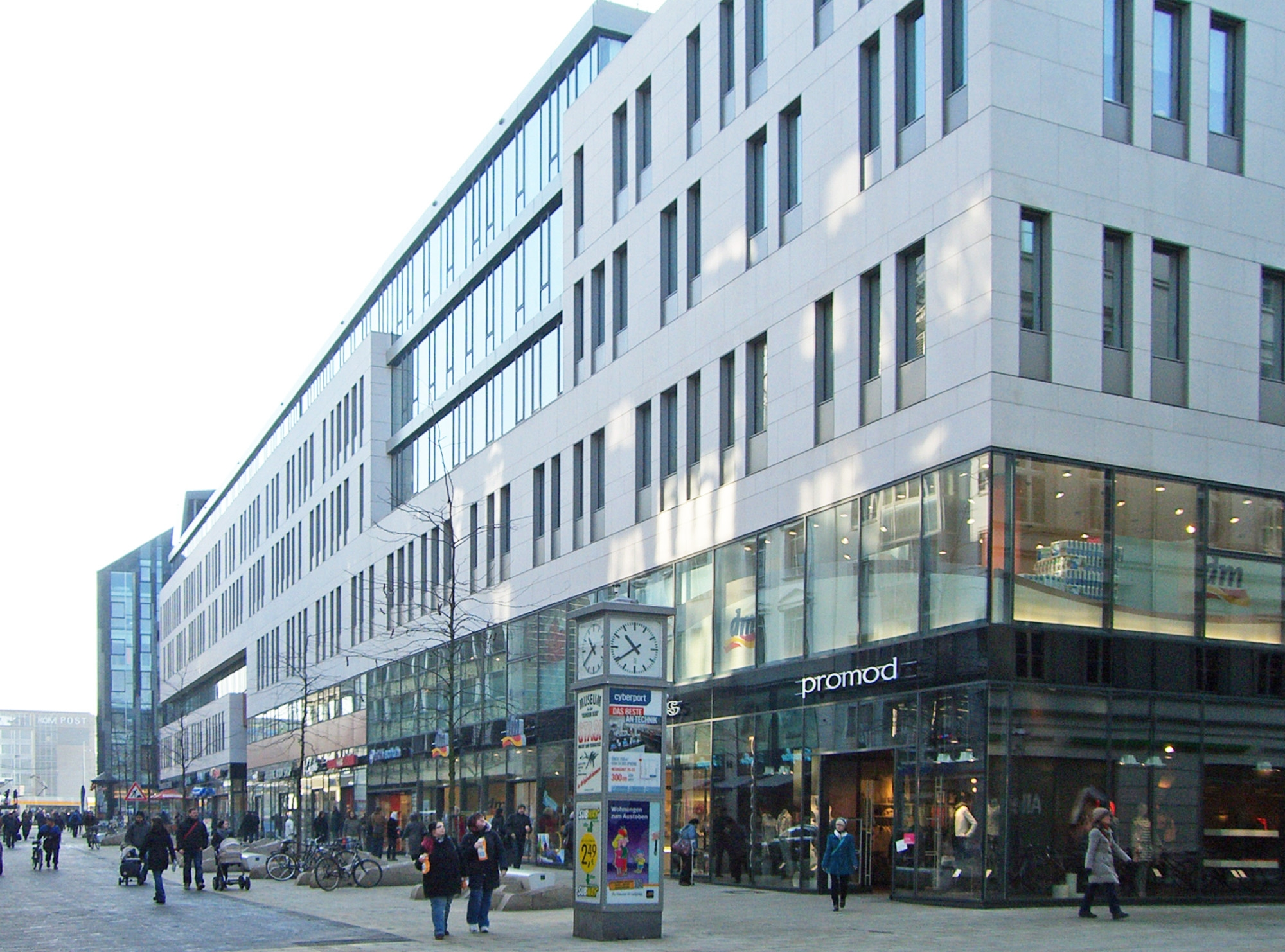
Institute building of the Leipzig university between Universitätsstrasse and Augustusplatz (2013)

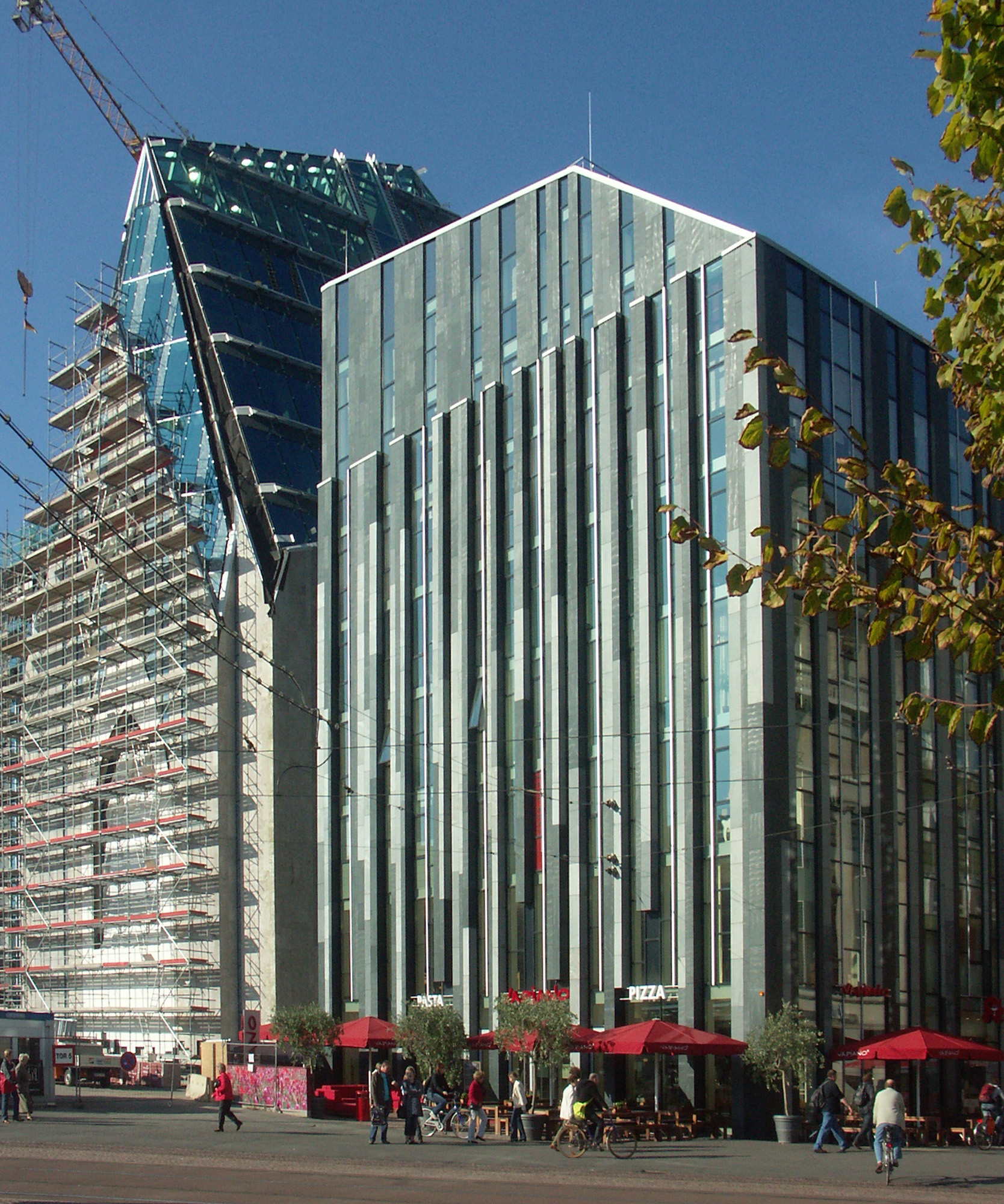
Successor building to the Café français and Café Felsche (2010)

== Other ==
Grimmaische Strasse is part of the annual Leipzig Christmas Market.

== See also ==
- List of arcade galleries in Leipzig
- List of streets and squares in Leipzig

== Bibliography ==
- Sebastian Ringel: Wie Leipzigs Innenstadt verschwunden ist. 150 verlorene Bauten aus 150 Jahren, edition überland, Leipzig 2019, ISBN 978-3-948049-00-3.
- Lutz Heydick: Leipzig. Historischer Führer zu Stadt und Land. Urania, Leipzig 1990, ISBN 3-332-00337-2
