= Endre Malcolm Holéczy =

- Born: Endre Malcolm Holéczy; July 12, 1982 (age 44); Basel-City, Switzerland
- Education: University of Music and Theatre Leipzig "Felix Mendelssohn Bartholdy", University of Tübingen, Brown University, New York University
- Occupations: Writer, Performer, Director, Academic

Endre M. Holéczy (born 1982) is a Hungarian-American-Swiss theater director, actor, and writer currently living in New York City.

== Education and life ==
Holéczy studied drama at the Hochschule für Musik und Theater Felix Mendelssohn Bartholdy in Leipzig where he graduated with a BA in Theater in 2007. After a series of theater and film engagements in Germany, he joined the Zimmertheater Tübingen ensemble where he performed for six years before starting to realize and direct his own productions. He continued his academic work in theater theory at Brown University.

== Film work ==
Holéczy had a role in German television series Die Pfefferkörner (ZDF Production).

== Filmography ==
- 2017 Half Brothers(Berlinale 2017, Tribecca Film Festival 2017)
- 2016 – 2013 An Evil Man (Web Series)
- 2014 Westend, Independent Feature Film, DPD Culture GmbH
- 2010 Die Pfefferkörner: Wühltisch Welpen (ZDF)
- 2010 Im Angesicht des Verbrechens (ARD)
- 2009 Polizeiruf 110 (ARD)

== Theater work as an actor (selected productions) ==
- 2007–2014 Zimmertheater Tübingen (Germany)
- 2007–2015 Monsieur Ibrahim und die Blumen des Koran“ by Eric-Emanuelle Schmitt (directed by Puja Behboud) One-Man-Show
- 2015 Mein Kampf by Georg Tabori (directed by Frank Siebenschuh)
- 2014 Morgen Spricht von mir die ganze Welt by Axel Krausse, Peter Sindlinger (directed by Axel Krausse)
- 2013 Judas! by Walter Jens (directed by Christian Schäfer) One-Man-Show
- 2013 Der Bürger als Ehemann by Molière (directed by Laurent Gröflin)
- 2012 Richard II by William Shakespeare (directed by Lauren Gröflin)
- 2012 Bartleby – eine Geschichte von der Wallstreet by Herman Melville, adapted by Kai Gero Lenke (directed by Luzius Heydrich)
- 2012 Es gibt kein Ende by Anna Jablonskaja (directed by Christian Schäfer, Co-Production with the Ruhrfestspiele Recklinghausen)
- 2011 Amphitryon by Heinrich von Kleist (directed by Christian Schäfer)
- 2011 Die Glasmenagerie by Tennessee Williams (directed by Axel Krausse)
- 2010 Die Braut von Messina by Friedrich Schiller (directed by Christian Schäfer)
- 2010 Romantik is Dead by Christian Schäfer, Joachim Zelter (directed by Christian Schäfer, Co-Production with the Ruhrfestspiele Recklinghausen)
- 2009 Kruse by Christian Hansen (directed by Laurent Gröflin)
- 2008 Hoffnung by Christian Hansen (directed by Lauren Gröflin)
- 2007 Alphapark by Joachim Zelter (directed by Christian Schäfer)
- 2005–2007 Neues Theater Halle (Studio)
- 2003-2007 Hochschule Für Musik und Theater Leipzig

== As a theater director ==
- 2017 Kokain by Pittigrilli
- 2014 Medea by Franz Grillparzer
- 2013 Lenz By Georg Büchner in an adaptation by Moritz Peters
- 2013 Verrücktes Blut by Nurkan Erpulat
- 2012 DNA by Dennis Kelly
- 2011 Dear Wendy by Lars von Trier
- 2010 Spring Awakening by Frank Wedekind
