= Axel Krause =

German painter and graphic artist

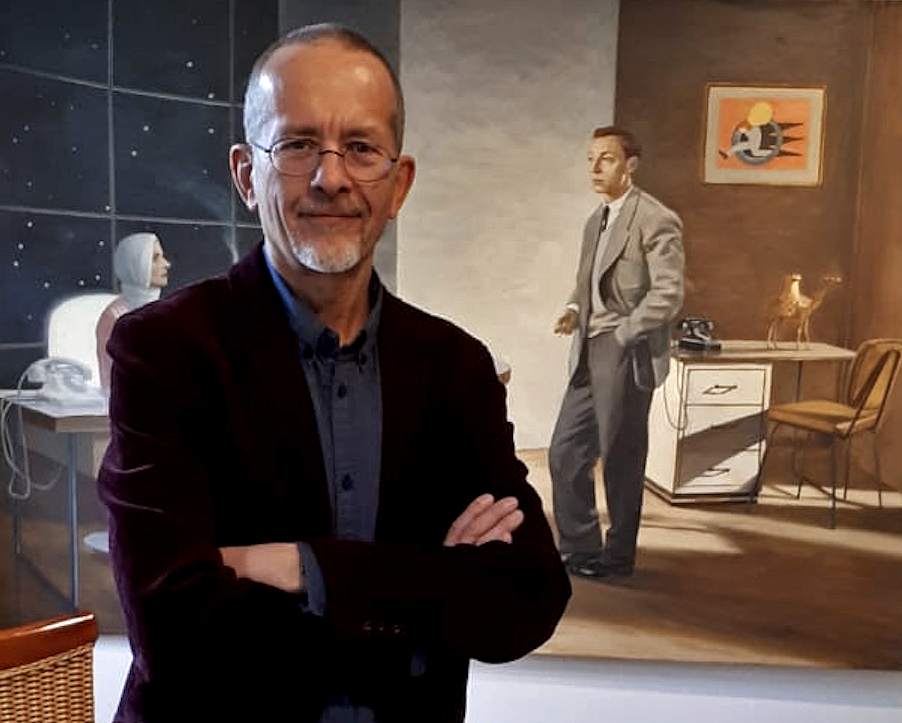
Axel Krause

Axel Krause, born 23 October 1958 in Halle (Saale), is a German painter and graphic artist. He is associated with the New Leipzig School and lives and works in Leipzig. He studied at the Hochschule für Grafik und Buchkunst Leipzig in 1981–1986. He taught at the school in 1989–1999 and worked for the Leipzig Opera in 1990–1993.

He paints with acrylic and oil. Typical for the New Leipzig School, Krause paints figurative subjects with mysterious and surreal elements and uses collage techniques. His interiors, landscapes and atmospheric scenes have been compared to American realists such as Edward Hopper.

Krause is sympathetic to the far-right German political party AfD. In 2018 the Leipzig art dealership Galerie Kleindienst announced that it would no longer represent Krause due to his political views. In 2019, Krause was one of 37 artists selected to exhibit at the Leipzig Annual Exhibition, but shortly before the exhibition was due to open the organisers announced that he had been ejected from the show, following objections to his inclusion.

== Solo exhibitions ==
- 1989 Galerie Süd, Leipzig
- 1994 Galerie Blüthner, Leipzig
- 1994 Panoramamuseum, Bad Frankenhausen
- 1994 Galerie Jüdenstraße, Wittenberg
- 1999 Städtische Galerie, Wesseling b. Cologne
- 2001 Westfalsches Haus, Leipzig - Markkleeberg
- 2002 Inter Art Galerie Reich, Cologne
- 2003 Neue Chemnitzer Kunsthütte, Chemnitz
- 2005 Gespann, Galerie Kleindienst, Leipzig
- 2007 Heimsuchung, Galerie Kleindienst, Leipzig
- 2007 Axel Krause solo exhibition, Gallery LM, Seoul, South Korea
- 2010 Schwarzmeer, Galerie Kleindienst, Leipzig
- 2012 Malerei/Graphik, Galerie Ratswall, Bitterfeld
- 2012 New Works, Gallery LVS, Seoul
- 2015 Spätfilm, Galerie Kleindienst, Leipzig

== Bibliography ==
- 2001 Convoy Leipzig, (catalogue), Biksady Galerie, Budapest
- 2001 Axel Krause - Zur See (catalogue), Galerie Kleindienst, Leipzig
- 2004 Axel Krause, in LVZ, 10.12.2004
- 2005 Axel Krause - Malerei (catalogue), Galerie Kleindienst, Leipzig
- 2006 Zurück zur Figur, Malerei der Gegenwart (catalogue), Kunsthalle der Hypo-Kulturstiftung, Munich
- 2006 Meinhard Michael: Die neue Leipziger Schule, LVZ, 09.01.2006
- 2008 Aussellungskatalog, Gallery LVS, Seoul (South Korea)
- 2010 Meinhard Michael: Leipzig malt, LVZ, 03/2010
- 2010 Anna Kaleri: Die synthetische Ordnung der Dinge, LVZ, 04/2010
- 2011 Kunstwerkstatt - Axel Krause (artist book), Prestel Verlag
