= Haus der Geschichte =

German museum of contemporary history

- Established: 1986, opening 1994
- Location: Willy-Brandt-Allee 14, 53113 Bonn, Germany
- Coordinates: 50.717491°N 7.118727°E
- Collection size: German Contemporary History
- Director: Harald Biermann
- Website: http://www.hdg.de/haus-der-geschichte

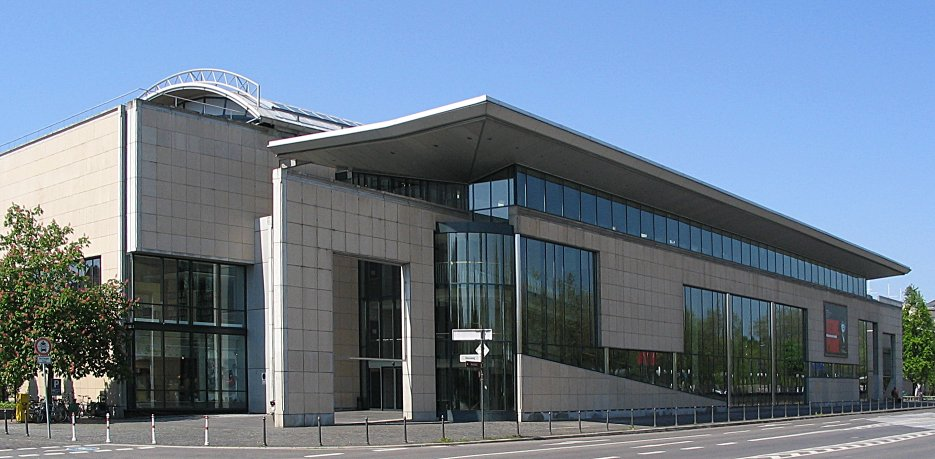
Haus der Geschichte

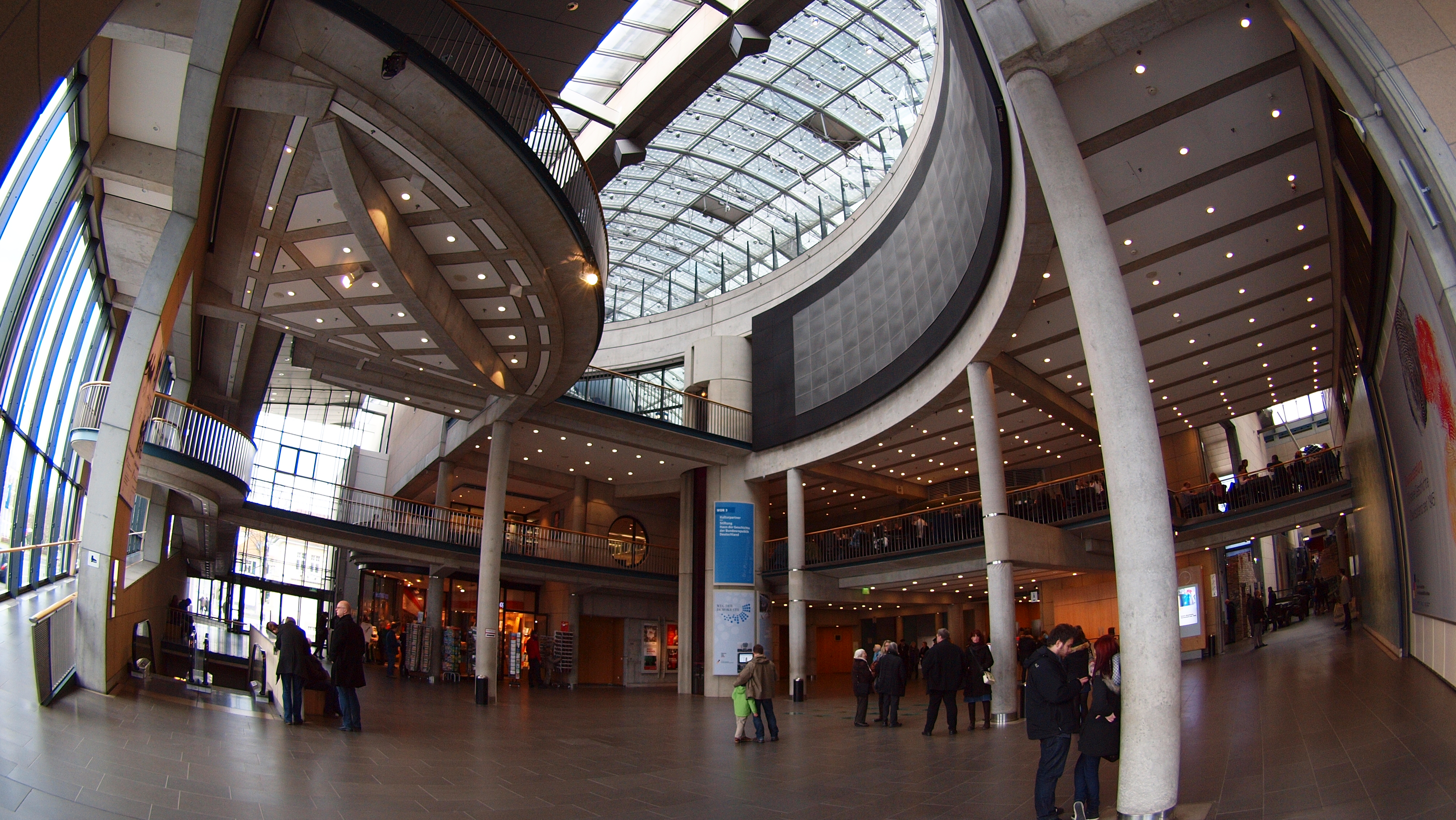
Haus der Geschichte - Entrance Hall

Haus der Geschichte (officially Haus der Geschichte der Bundesrepublik Deutschland, i.e. "House of the History of the Federal Republic of Germany") is a museum of contemporary history in Bonn, Germany. With around one million visitors every year, it is one of the most popular German museums. The Haus der Geschichte is part of the Haus der Geschichte der Bundesrepublik Deutschland Foundation, alongside the "Zeitgeschichtliches Forum Leipzig", the "Tränenpalast" at Berlin Friedrichstraße station and the "Museum in the Kulturbrauerei". The foundation's headquarters is in Bonn.

In its permanent exhibition, the Haus der Geschichte presents German history from 1945 until the present. Numerous temporary exhibitions emphasize different features. The Haus der Geschichte also organizes guided tours of the Palais Schaumburg (has been closed since August 2013 because of building restoration), the Chancellor's bungalow and the former place of the Federal Assembly. Moreover, the museum maintains a cartoon collection with over 75,000 political cartoons and caricatures.

== Location ==
The Haus der Geschichte is located on Bundesstraße 9 and is part of the Museumsmeile (Museum Mile) in Bonn, which is part of the former West German government district. It is located north of the Kunstmuseum Bonn and the Kunst- und Ausstellungshalle der Bundesrepublik Deutschland, which are also part of the Museumsmeile. The Haus der Geschichte can be directly accessed from the subway station (Heusallee/Museumsmeile).

== Permanent exhibition ==
The permanent exhibition in the Haus der Geschichte chronicles the recent history of Germany from the end of World War II until the present day. More than 7,000 artifacts and 160 media exhibits covering an area of 4,000m² document contemporary German history in an international context. The exhibition follows a chronological timeline and covers subjects affecting the period before and after German reunification.

The museum puts special emphasis on the orientation of visitors and a vivid presentation of historical events. Under the slogan "Experience History", the concept is to draw attention to historical objects and make them come alive for visitors. This happens also through the use of historical film and sound records. While the political history of the Federal Republic of Germany and the former East Germany (GDR) is the common thread of the permanent exhibition, the presentation of everyday and cultural history also offers visitors an opportunity to deal with their own past and encourages an intergenerational dialogue. Aside from exhibitions, numerous scientific conventions and events take place at the Haus der Geschichte.

=== Information centre ===
An information centre with a reference library including extensive audiovisual resources allows visitors to research historical topics in greater detail. The former library of the Gesamtdeutsche Institut (library on the history of the GDR) has been housed in the Haus der Geschichte since 1 January 1994 and is integrated into the information centre. With a catalogue of more than 180,000 volumes amassed over 50 years, it is one of the leading collections on the history of the GDR and of relations between the GDR and the Federal Republic of Germany.

=== Refurbishment ===
The first refurbishment of the permanent exhibition was completed in July 2001, the focus of which was the theme of reunification. The planning for a second phase of refurbishment started in autumn 2007 and renovations began in October 2011. These changes dedicated more space to the Cold War and the Berlin Wall and were completed in May 2011 which meant that over half of the original layout had been refurbished, including the gallery in the U-Bahn station on the lower floor. A further update to the permanent exhibition was completed in December 2017 and was officially opened by Federal President Frank-Walter Steinmeier.

== History ==
In his government statement of October 13, 1982, right after taking office, Chancellor of Germany Helmut Kohl called for a collection of German history and the German division after 1945. He presented plans to establish a museum of German history in West Berlin, to be complemented by a House of History of the Federal Republic of Germany in Bonn dedicated specifically to the West German state. While some feared that a national museum would be viewed as an attempt to kindle a new nationalism, others argued that it was precisely because Germany's past was so complex and wrenching that Germans needed to understand their history. The German Bundestag confirmed the institution in 1989. Helmut Kohl opened the permanent exhibition on June 14, 1994. The first president of the foundation was Hermann Schäfer. In June 2007, Hans Walter Hütter, his long-term representative, was appointed as his successor.

== Construction ==
The building was designed in 1985 by the architects Ingeborg and Hartmut Rüdiger from Braunschweig. Construction works began in September 1989. The building has a total floor space of around 22,000 square meters, 4,000 square meters for the permanent exhibition, and over 650 square meters for temporary exhibitions.

== Structure ==
The independent foundation under public law, "Stiftung Haus der Geschichte der Bundesrepublik Deutschland", is owned by the public purse and financed by the Federal Republic of Germany. The four entities of the foundation are the board of trustees, the academic advisory council, the committee of social groups and the president.

The board of trustees as supervisor approves the budget and the basic program composition, and makes important personnel decisions. It is composed of representatives of the factions of the German Bundestag, the federal government, and all federal states. The current chairman of the board of trustees is Andreas Görgen.

The academic advisory council (chairman Joachim Scholtyseck) advises the board of trustees and the president of the foundation as to the museum's legal mission, especially as it affects the conceptional preparation of temporary exhibitions and the content of the permanent exhibition. The academic advisory council, consisting of historians, political scientists, experts in international law and museum experts, is an important guarantor for the independence of the foundation from political influence.

The committee of social groups (Arbeitskreis gesellschaftlicher Gruppen, chairman Regine Möbius), represents the interests of museum visitors, major religious groups, employers' and employees' associations, foreigners, women, young people, and major community authorities when advising the board of trustees and the foundation president.

The president of the foundation, Harald Biermann, manages the business of the foundation and decides matters which are not the responsibility of the board of trustees.

== See also ==
- Tränenpalast
- Museum in the Kulturbrauerei
- Zeitgeschichtliches Forum Leipzig
- The Step of the Century
