= German art =

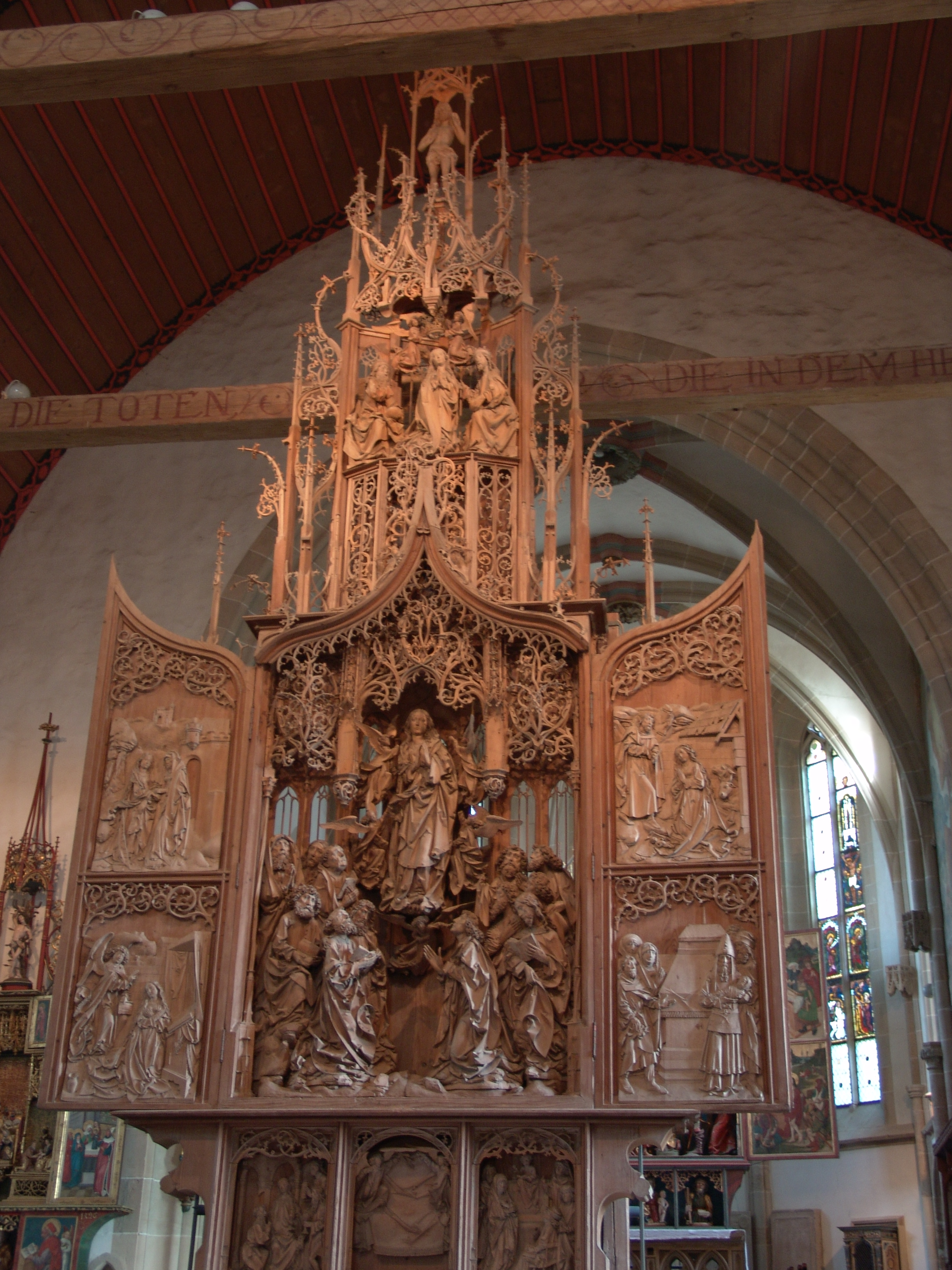
Late Gothic Marienaltar by Tilman Riemenschneider, 1505-1508, Herrgottskirche, Creglingen

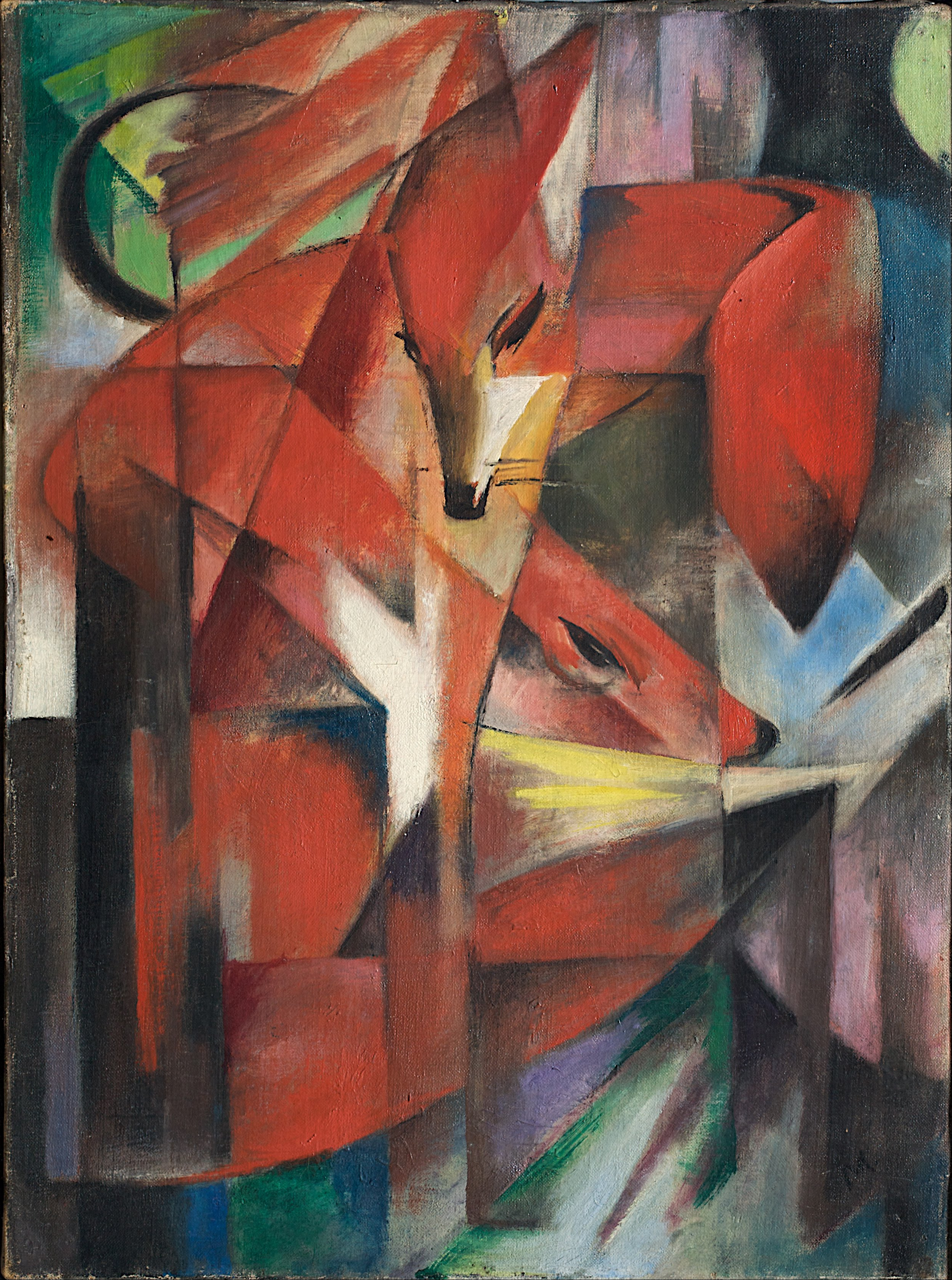
Die Füchse(The Foxes), 1913, by Franz Marc

German art has a long and distinguished tradition in the visual arts, from the earliest known work of figurative art to its current output of contemporary art.

Germany has only been united into a single state since the 19th century, and defining its borders has been a notoriously difficult and painful process. For earlier periods German art often effectively includes that produced in German-speaking regions including Austria, Alsace and much of Switzerland, as well as largely German-speaking cities or regions to the east of the modern German borders.

Although tending to be neglected relative to Italian and French contributions from the point of view of the English-speaking world, German art has played a crucial role in the development of Western art, especially Celtic art, Carolingian art and Ottonian art. From the development of Romanesque art, France and Italy began to lead developments for the rest of the Middle Ages, but the production of an increasingly wealthy Germany remained highly important.

The German Renaissance developed in rather different directions to the Italian Renaissance, and was initially dominated by the central figure of Albrecht Dürer and the early German domination of printing. The final phase of the Renaissance, Northern Mannerism, was centred around the edges of the German lands, in Flanders and the Imperial capital of Prague, but, especially in architecture, the German Baroque and Rococo took up these imported styles with enthusiasm. The German origins of Romanticism did not lead to an equally central position in the visual arts, but Germany´s contributions to the many broadly Modernist movements following the collapse of Academic art in the form of Expressionism, Dada, New Objectivity and Bauhaus played a major role in the emergence of modern art.

== Prehistory to Late Antiquity ==
Venus of Hohle Fels, 42,000 to 40,000 BP, the oldest known figurative work of art (true height 6 cm (2.4 in))

The area of modern Germany is rich in finds of prehistoric art, including the Löwenmensch, the world´s oldest statue, and the Venus of Hohle Fels, found in the Swabian Alps. This appears to be the oldest undisputed example of Upper Paleolithic art and figurative sculpture of the human form in general, from over 42,000 years BP, which was only discovered in 2008; the better-known Venus of Willendorf (24–22,000 BP) comes from a little way over the Austrian border. Spectacular finds from the Bronze Age include the Nebra Sky Disc belonging to the Aunjetitz culture, and Golden hats associated with the Tulumus culture and Urnfield culture. Numerous artefacts are also known from the early Iron Age Hallstatt culture.

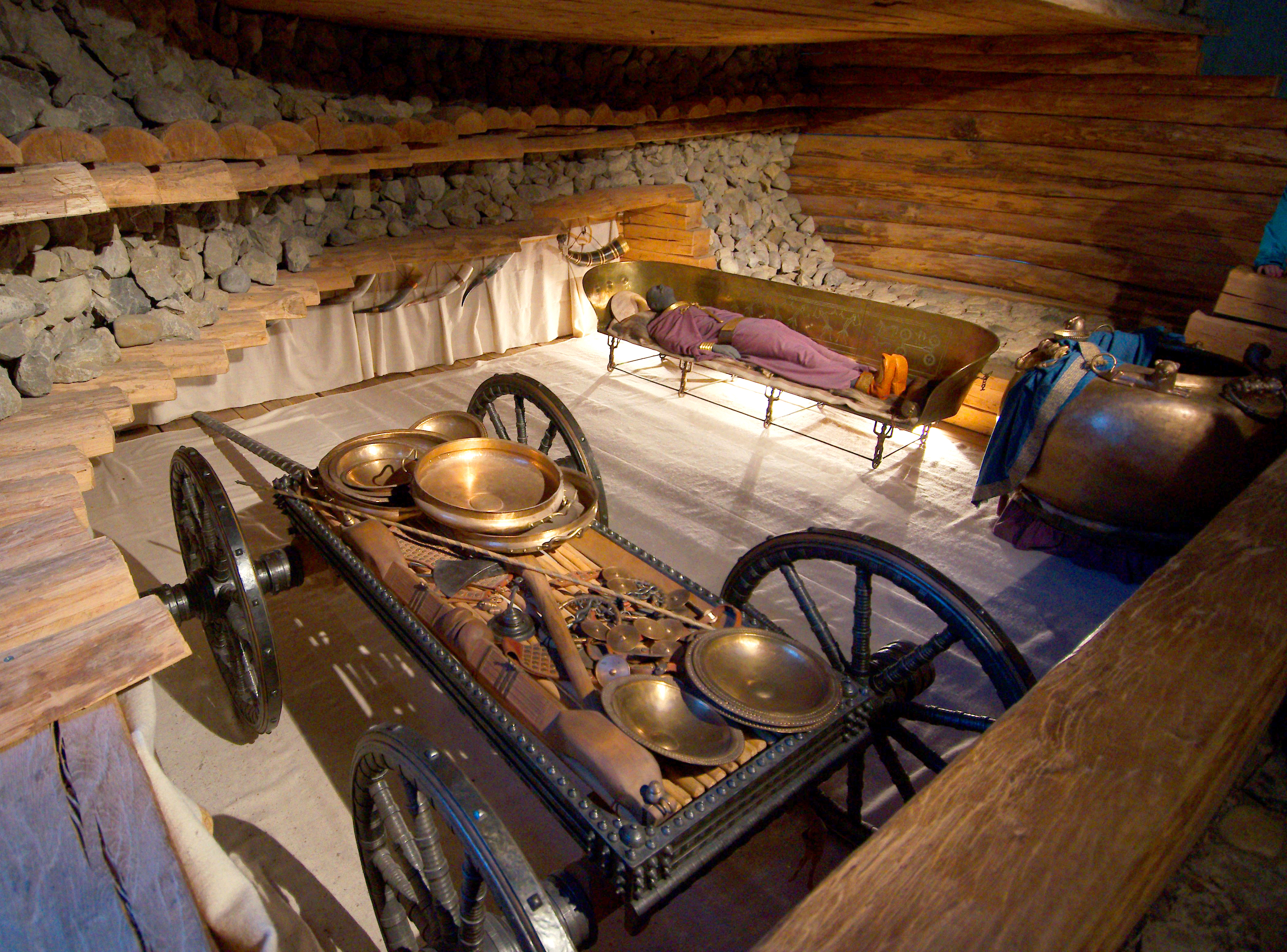
Reconstruction of the Hochdorf Chieftain's Grave, Stuttgart

In the Iron Age the "Celtic" La Tène culture centred on Western Germany and Eastern France, and Germany has produced many major finds of Celtic art like the elite burials at Reinheim and Hochdorf, and oppida towns like Glauberg, Manching and Heuneburg.

After lengthy wars, the Roman Empire settled its frontiers in Germania with the Limes Germanicus to include much of the south and west of modern Germany. The German provinces produced art in provincial versions of Roman styles, but centres there, as over the Rhine in France, were large-scale producers of fine Ancient Roman pottery, exported all over the Empire. Rheinzabern was one of the largest, which has been well-excavated and has a dedicated museum.

Non-Romanized areas of the later Roman period fall under Migration Period art, notable for metalwork, especially jewellery (the largest pieces apparently mainly worn by men).

== Middle Ages ==
=== Carolingian art ===
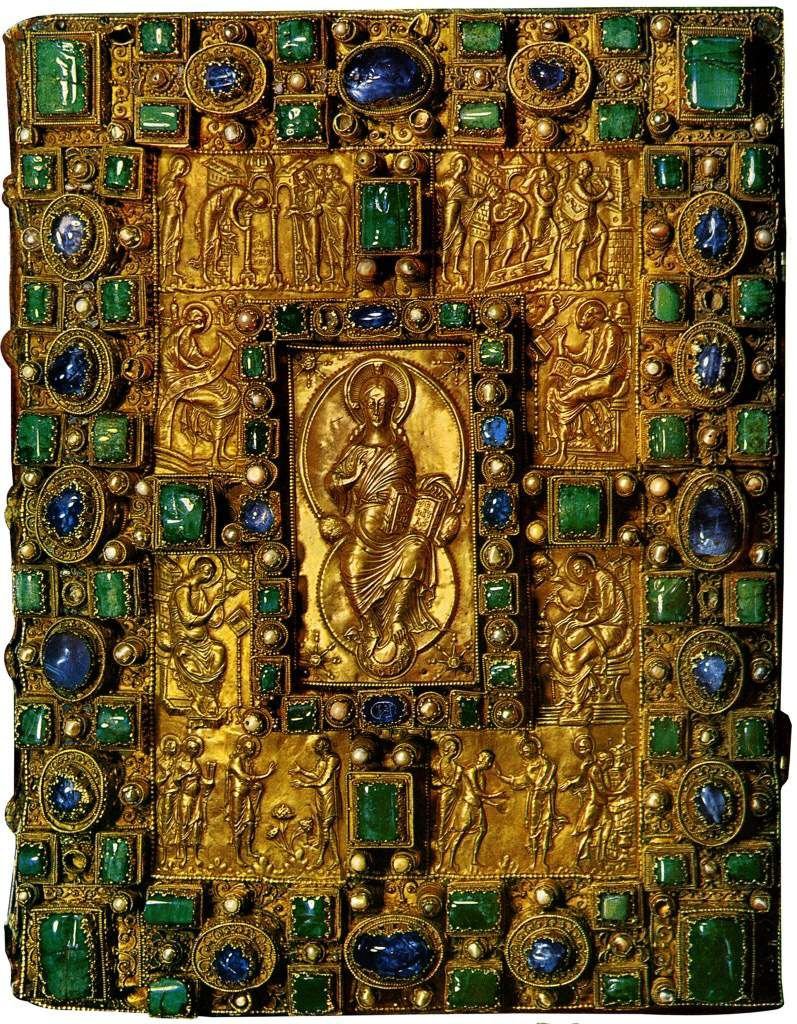
Gem-encrusted cover of the Codex Aureus of St. Emmeram, 870

German medieval art really begins with the Frankish Empire of Charlemagne (d. 814), the first state to rule the great majority of the modern territory of Germany, as well as France and much of Italy. Carolingian art was restricted to a relatively small number of objects produced for a circle around the court and a number of Imperial abbeys they sponsored, but had a huge influence on later Medieval art across Europe. The most common type of object to survive is the illuminated manuscript; wall paintings were evidently common but, like the buildings that housed them, have nearly all vanished. The earlier centres of illumination were located in modern France, but later Metz in Lorraine and the Abbey of Saint Gall in modern Switzerland came to rival them. The Drogo Sacramentary and Folchard Psalter are among the manuscripts they produced.

No Carolingian monumental sculpture survives, although perhaps the most important patronage of Charlemagne was his commissioning of a life-size gold figure of Christ on a crucifix for his Palatine Chapel in Aachen; this is only known from literary references and was probably gold foil around a wooden base, probably modelled with a gesso layer, like the later and rather crumpled Golden Madonna of Essen. Early Christian art had not featured monumental sculptures of religious figures as opposed to rulers, as these were strongly associated by the Church Fathers with the cult idols of Ancient Roman religion. Byzantine art and modern Eastern Orthodox religious art have maintained the prohibition to the present day, but Western art was apparently decisively influenced by the example of Charlemagne to abandon it. Charlemagne's circle wished to revive the glories of classical style, which they mostly knew in its Late Antique form, and also to compete with Byzantine art, in which they appear to have been helped by refugee artists from the convulsions of the Byzantine iconoclasm. As Charlemagne himself does not appear to have been very interested in visual art, his political rivalry with the Byzantine Empire, supported by the Papacy, may have contributed to the strong pro-image position expressed in the Libri Carolini, which set out the position on images held with little variation by the Western Church for the rest of the Middle Ages, and beyond.

=== Ottonian art ===
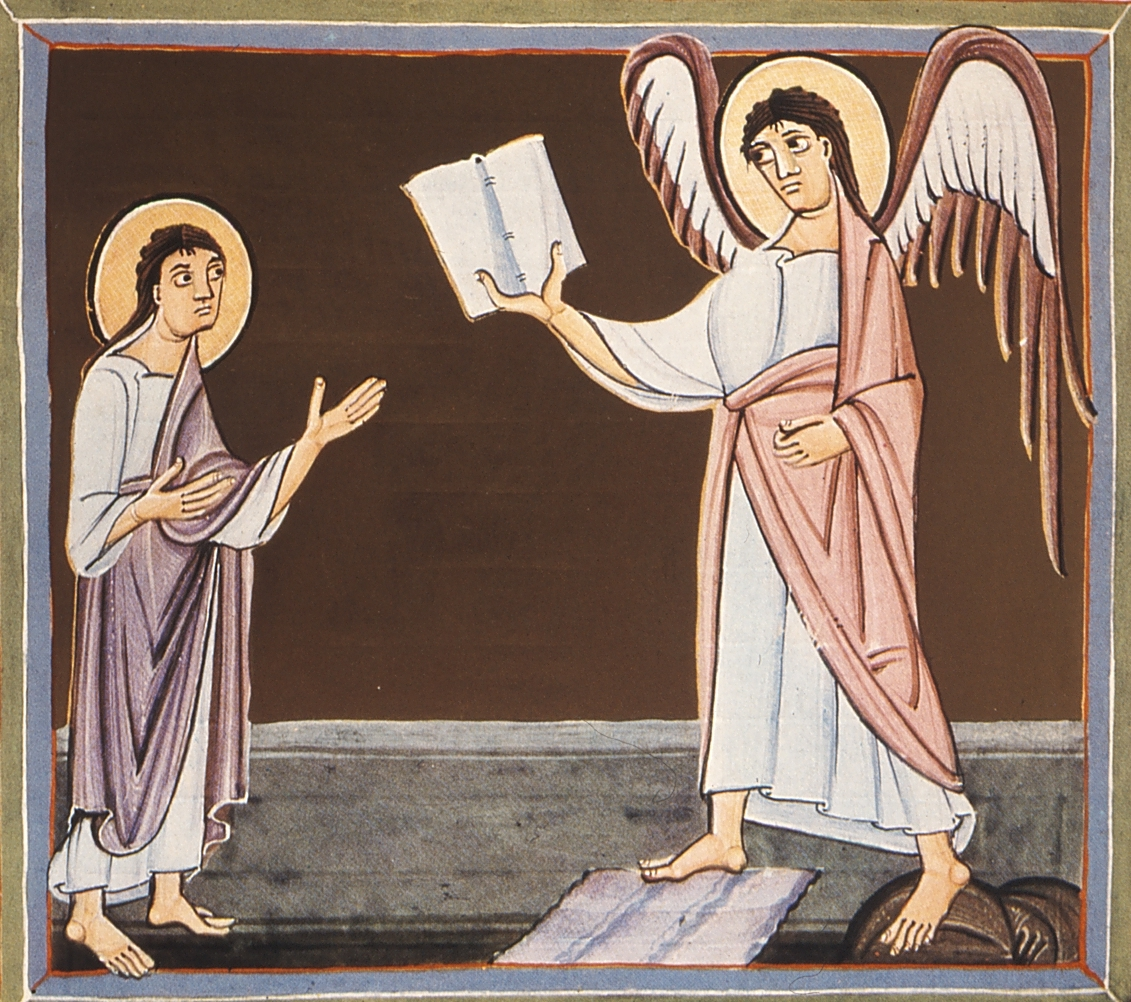
The Bamberg Apocalypse, from the Ottonian Reichenau School, achieves monumentality in a small scale. 1000–1020.

Under the next Ottonian dynasty, whose core territory approximated more closely to modern Germany, Austria, and German-speaking Switzerland, Ottonian art was mainly a product of the large monasteries, especially Reichenau which was the leading Western artistic centre in the second half of the 10th century. The Reichenau style uses simplified and patterned shapes to create strongly expressive images, far from the classical aspirations of Carolingian art, and looking forward to the Romanesque. The wooden Gero Cross of 965–970 in Cologne Cathedral is both the oldest and the finest early medieval near life-size crucifix figure; art historians had been reluctant to credit the records giving its date until they were confirmed by dendrochronology in 1976. As in the rest of Europe, metalwork was still the most prestigious form of art, in works like the jewelled Cross of Lothair, made about 1000, probably in Cologne.

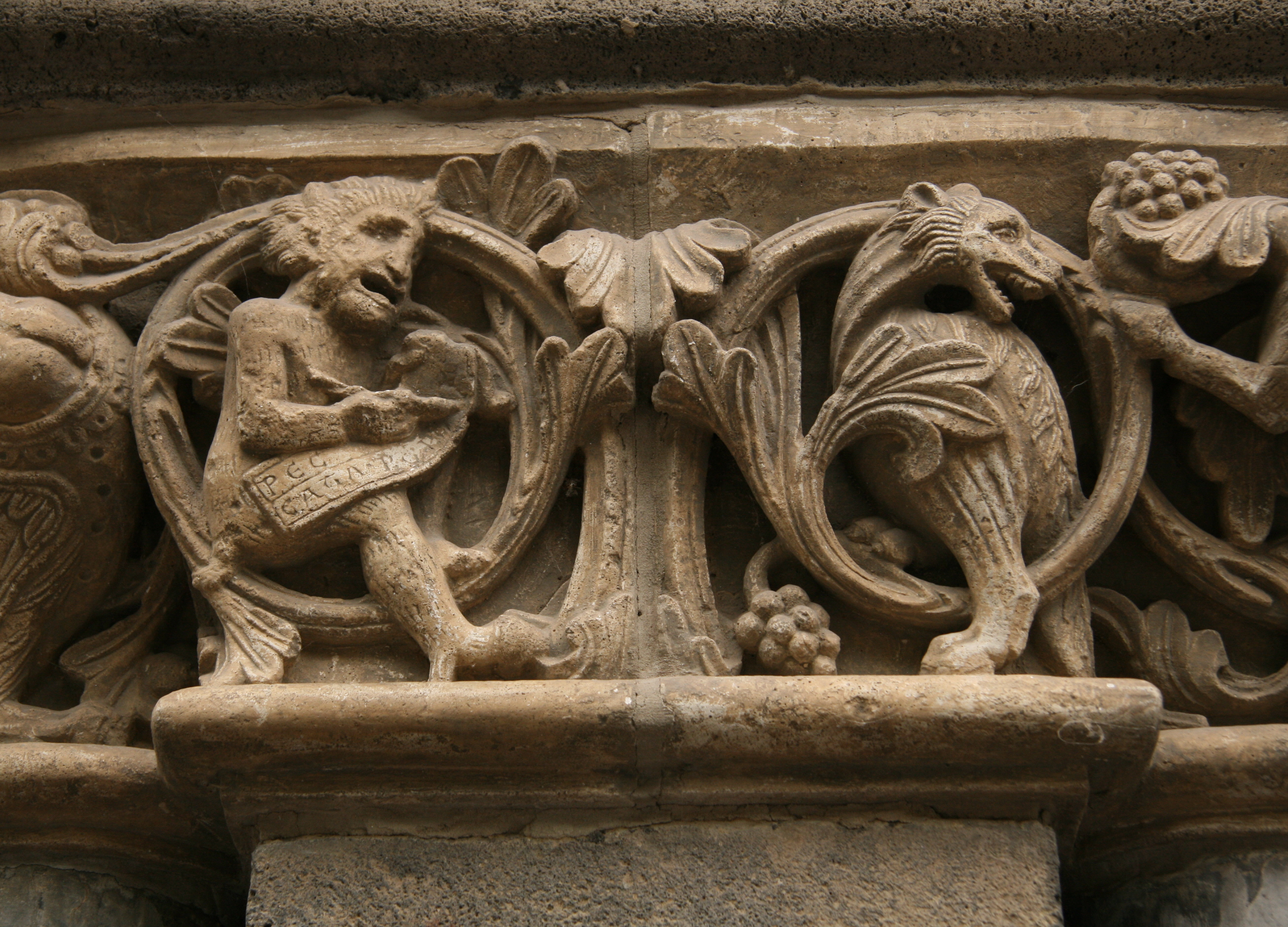
Romanesque carving from Maria Laach Abbey

=== Romanesque art ===
Romanesque art was the first artistic movement to encompass the whole of Western Europe, though with regional varieties. Germany was a central part of the movement, though German Romanesque architecture made rather less use of sculpture than that of France. With increasing prosperity massive churches were built in cities all over Germany, no longer just those patronized by the Imperial circle.

German Romanesque art, spanning from the 10th to the 12th centuries, played a significant role in the broader development of European Romanesque architecture and art. While Romanesque architecture is often associated with large, fortified churches, monasteries, and castles, the German iteration had its distinct characteristics, influenced by the Holy Roman Empire's political and religious framework.

One of the key features of German Romanesque architecture was its emphasis on monumental scale. Churches were typically built with a strong emphasis on verticality and grandiose proportions, with thick walls, massive towers, and small, deeply set windows. These buildings often featured cruciform plans (shaped like a cross), which allowed for an organized division of space that also served liturgical purposes. The interiors of these churches were often characterized by barrel vaults and groin vaults, which were used to support the heavy stone structures.

=== Gothic art ===
The French invented the Gothic style, and Germany was slow to adopt it, but once it had done so Germans made it their own, and continued to use it long after the rest of Europe had abandoned it. According to Henri Focillon, Gothic allowed German art "to define for the first time certain aspects of its native genius-a vigorous and emphatic conception of life and form, in which theatrical ostentation mingled with vehement emotional frankness." The Bamberg Horseman of the 1330s, in Bamberg Cathedral, is the oldest large post-antique standing stone equestrian statue; more medieval princely tomb monuments have survived from Germany than France or England. Romanesque and Early Gothic churches had wall paintings in local versions of international styles, of which few artists' names are known.

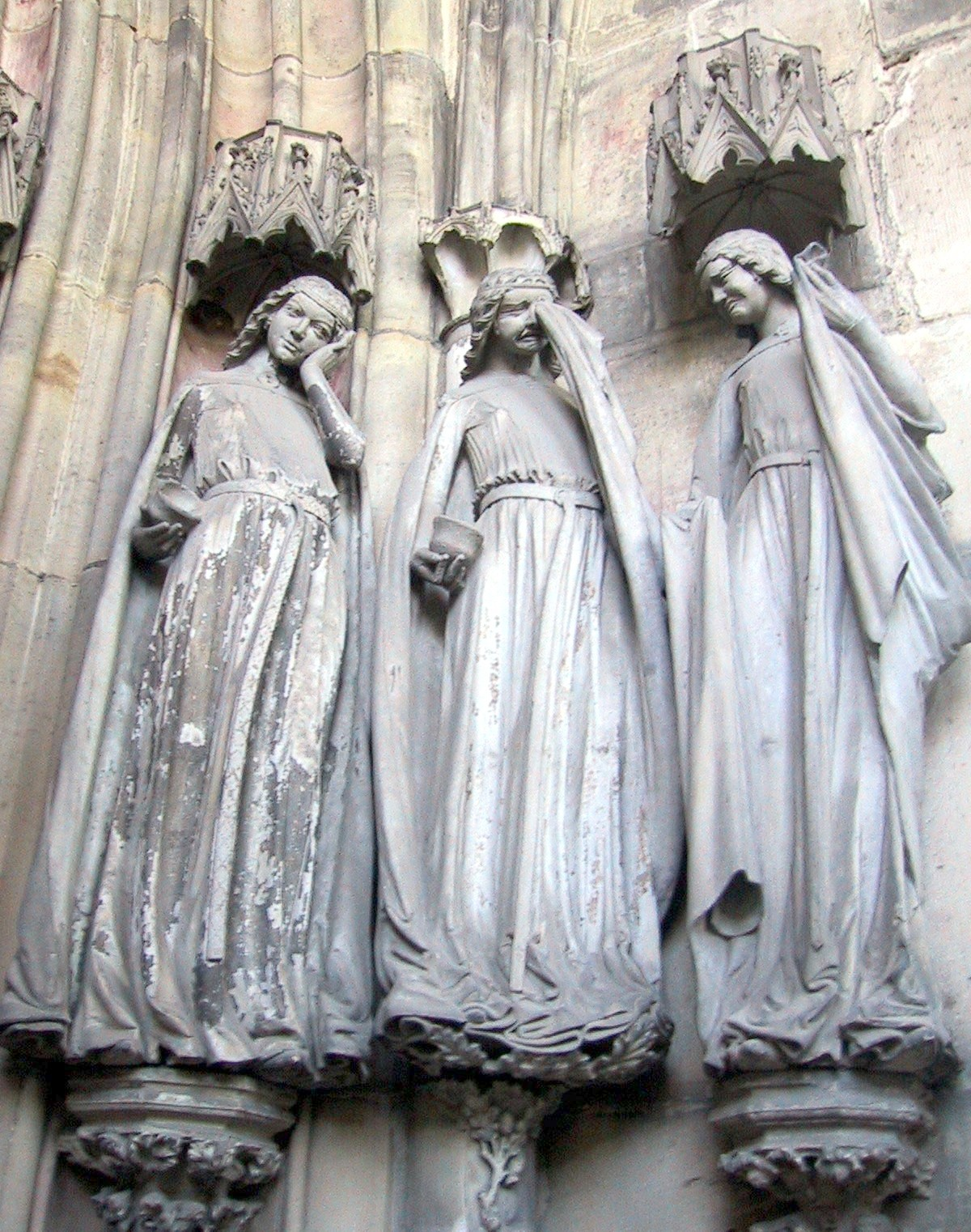
Three Foolish Virgins, Magdeburg Cathedral, c. 1250

The court of the Holy Roman Emperor, then based in Prague, played an important part in forming the International Gothic style in the late 14th century. The style was spread around the wealthy cities of Northern Germany by artists such Conrad von Soest in Westphalia, Meister Bertram in Hamburg, and later Stefan Lochner in Cologne. Hamburg was one of the cities in the Hanseatic League, when the League was at height of its prosperity. Bertram was succeeded in the city by artists such as Master Francke, the Master of the Malchin Altar, Hans Bornemann, Hinrik Funhof and Wilm Dedeke who survived into the Renaissance period. Hanseatic artists painted commissions for Baltic cities in Scandinavia and the modern Baltic states to the east. In the south, the Master of the Bamberg Altar is the first significant painter based in Nuremberg, while the Master of Heiligenkreuz and then Michael Pacher worked in Austria.

Like that of Pacher, the workshop of Bernt Notke, a painter from the Hanseatic city of Lübeck, both painted altarpieces or carved them in the increasingly elaborate painted and gilded style used as frameworks or alternatives for painted panels. South German wood sculpture was important in developing new subjects that reflected the intensely emotional devotional life encouraged by movements in late medieval Catholicism such as German mysticism. These are often known in English as andachtsbilder (devotional images) and include the Pietà, Pensive Christ, Man of Sorrows, Arma Christi, Veil of Veronica, the severed head of John the Baptist, and the Virgin of Sorrows, many of which would spread across Europe and remain popular until the Baroque and, in popular religious imagery, beyond. Indeed "Late Gothic Baroque" is a term sometimes used to describe hyper-decorated and emotional 15th-century art, above all in Germany.

Martin Schongauer, who worked in Alsace in the last part of the 15th century, was the culmination of late Gothic German painting, with a sophisticated and harmonious style, but he increasingly spent his time producing engravings, for which national and international channels of distribution had developed, so that his prints were known in Italy and other countries. His predecessors were the Master of the Playing Cards and Master E. S., both also from the Upper Rhine region. German conservatism is shown in the late use of gold backgrounds, still used by many artists well into the 15th century.

== Renaissance painting and prints ==
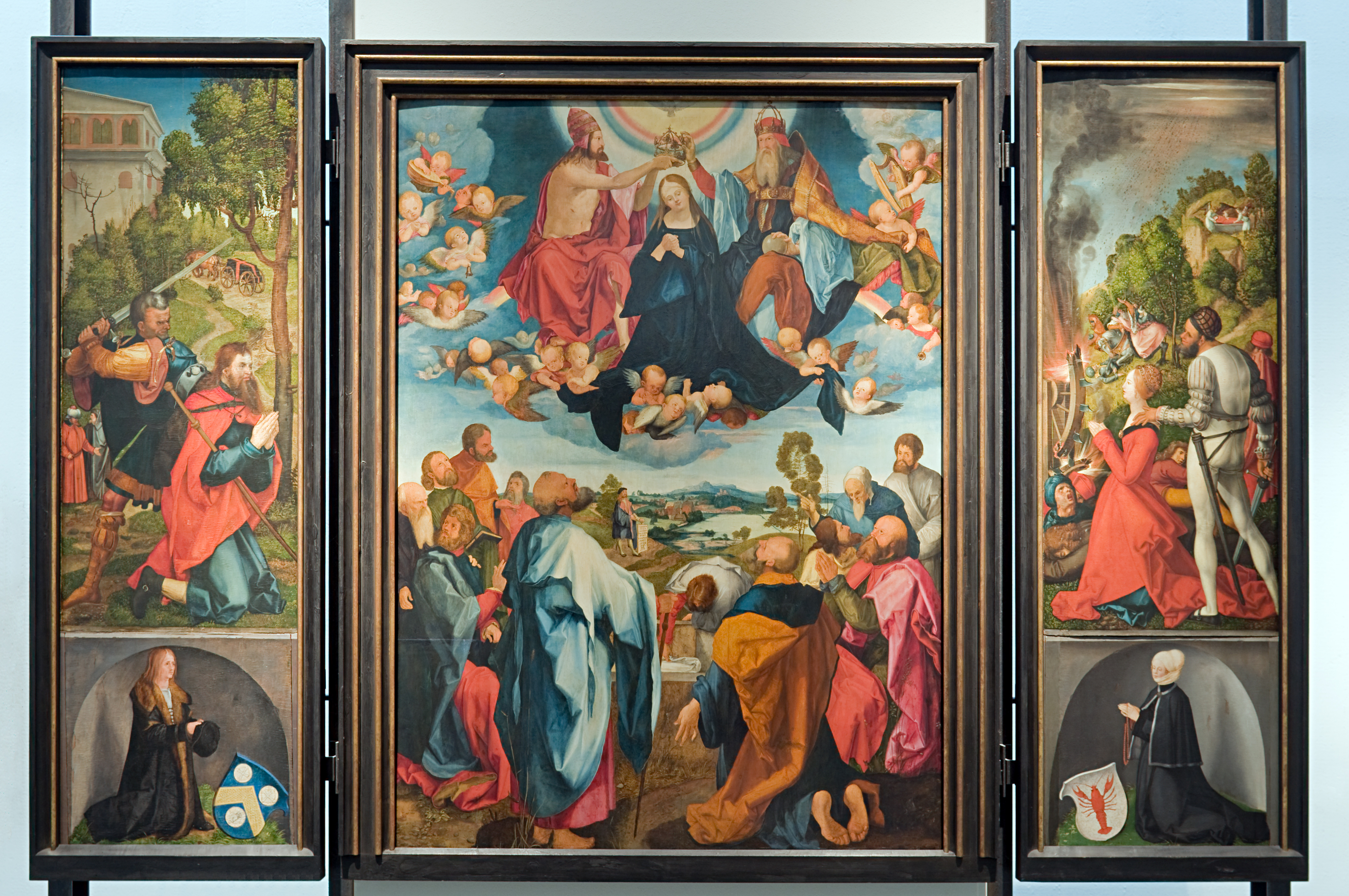
The Heller altar by Albrecht Dürer

The concept of the Northern Renaissance or German Renaissance is somewhat confused by the continuation of the use of elaborate Gothic ornament until well into the 16th century, even in works that are undoubtedly Renaissance in their treatment of the human figure and other respects. Classical ornament had little historical resonance in much of Germany, but in other respects Germany was very quick to follow developments, especially in adopting printing with movable type, a German invention that remained almost a German monopoly for some decades, and was first brought to most of Europe, including France and Italy, by Germans.

=== Printmaking and Dürer ===
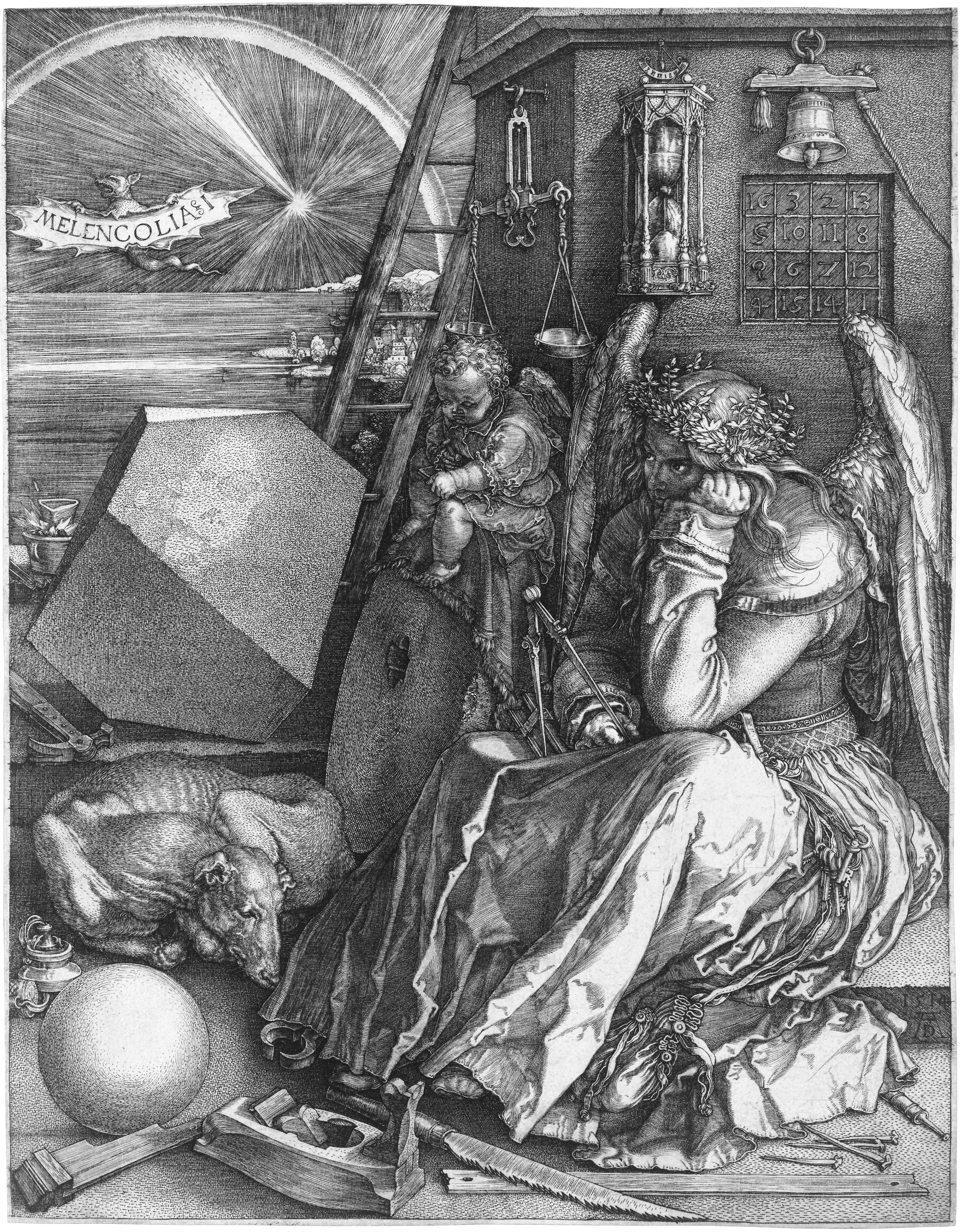
Melencolia I, 1514, engraving by Albrecht Dürer

Printmaking by woodcut, etching, invented by Daniel Hopfer, and engraving (perhaps another German invention) was already more developed in Germany and the Low Countries than anywhere else, and the Germans took the lead in developing book illustrations, typically of a relatively low artistic standard, but seen all over Europe, with the woodblocks often being lent to printers of editions in other cities or languages. The greatest artist of the German Renaissance, Albrecht Dürer, began his career as an apprentice to a leading workshop in Nuremberg, that of Michael Wolgemut, who had largely abandoned his painting to exploit the new medium. Dürer worked on the most extravagantly illustrated book of the period, the Nuremberg Chronicle, published by his godfather Anton Koberger, Europe's largest printer-publisher at the time.

After completing his apprenticeship in 1490, Dürer travelled in Germany for four years, and Italy for a few months, before establishing his own workshop in Nuremberg. He rapidly became famous all over Europe for his energetic and balanced woodcuts and engravings, while also painting. Though retaining a distinctively German style, his work shows strong Italian influence, and is often taken to represent the start of the German Renaissance in visual art, which for the next forty years replaced the Netherlands and France as the area producing the greatest innovation in Northern European art. Dürer supported Martin Luther but continued to create Madonnas and other Catholic imagery, and paint portraits of leaders on both sides of the emerging split of the Protestant Reformation.

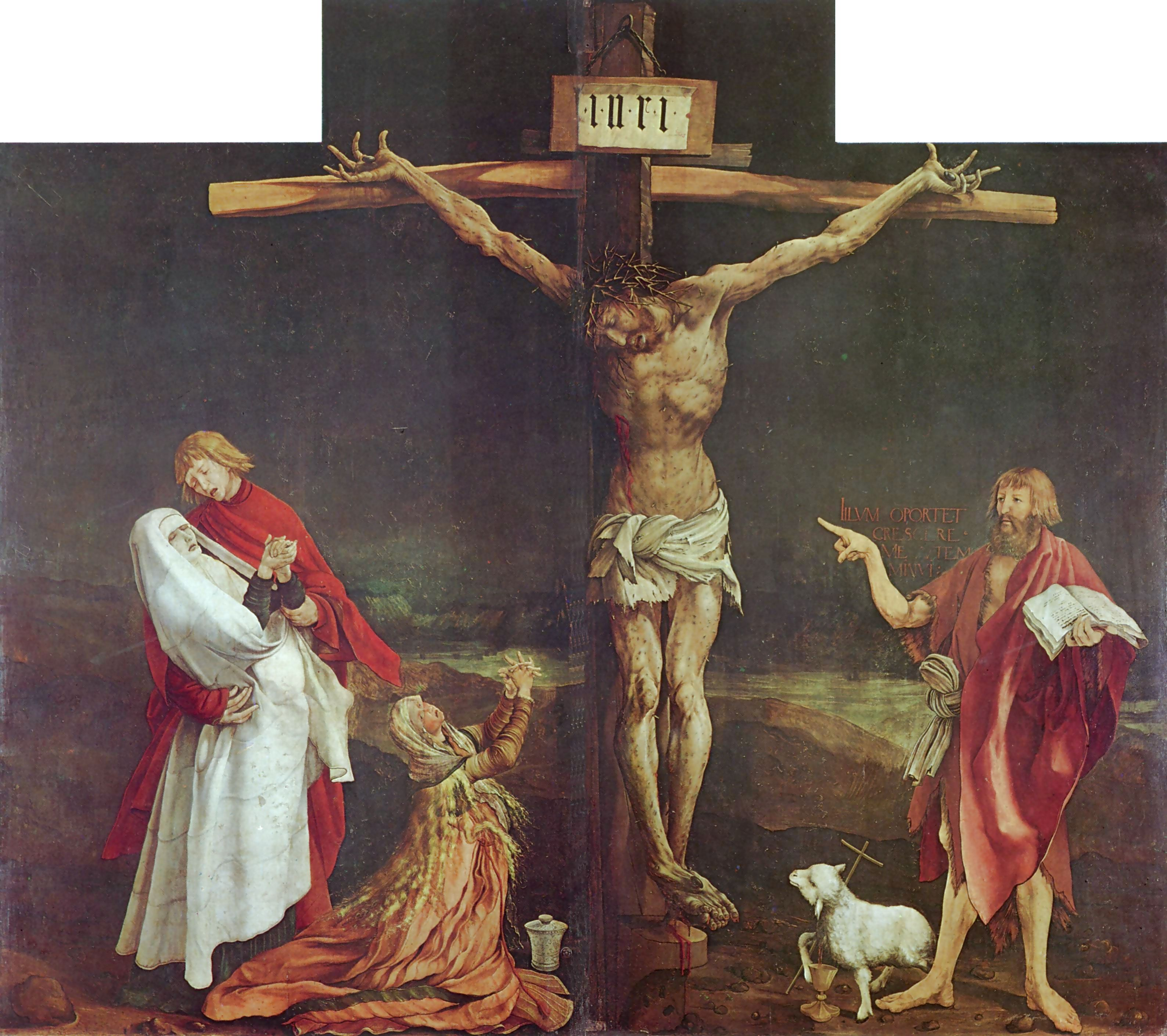
The Crucifixion, central panel of the Isenheim Altarpiece by Matthias Grünewald

Dürer died in 1528, before it was clear that the split of the Reformation had become permanent, but his pupils of the following generation were unable to avoid taking sides. Most leading German artists became Protestants, but this deprived them of painting most religious works, previously the mainstay of artists' revenue. Martin Luther had objected to much Catholic imagery, but not to imagery itself, and Lucas Cranach the Elder, a close friend of Luther, had painted a number of "Lutheran altarpieces", mostly showing the Last Supper, some with portraits of the leading Protestant divines as the Twelve Apostles. This phase of Lutheran art was over before 1550, probably under the more fiercely aniconic influence of Calvinism, and religious works for public display virtually ceased to be produced in Protestant areas. Presumably largely because of this, the development of German art had virtually ceased by about 1550, but in the preceding decades German artists had been very fertile in developing alternative subjects to replace the gap in their order books. Lucas Cranach the Younger, apart from portraits, developed a format of thin vertical portraits of provocative nudes, given classical or Biblical titles.

Lying somewhat outside these developments is Matthias Grünewald, who left very few works, but whose masterpiece, his Isenheim Altarpiece (completed 1515), has been widely regarded as the greatest German Renaissance painting since it was restored to critical attention in the 19th century. It is an intensely emotional work that continues the German Gothic tradition of unrestrained gesture and expression, using Renaissance compositional principles, but all in that most Gothic of forms, the multi-winged triptych.

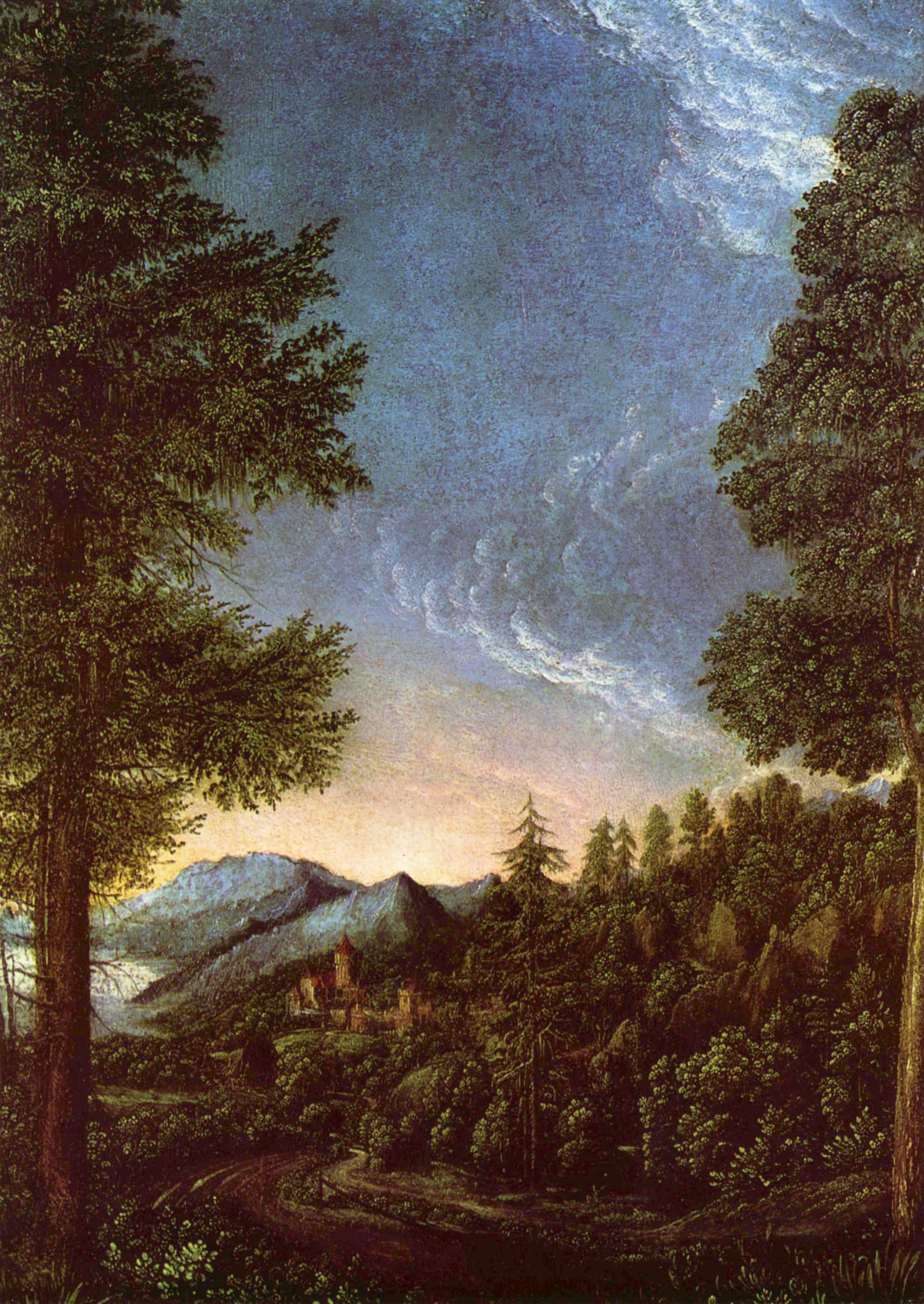
Albrecht Altdorfer (c. 1480–1538), Danube landscape near Regensburg c. 1528, one of the earliest Western pure landscapes, from the Danube School in southern Germany

=== Danube School and Northern Mannerism ===
The Danube School is the name of a circle of artists of the first third of the 16th century in Bavaria and Austria, including Albrecht Altdorfer, Wolf Huber and Augustin Hirschvogel. With Altdorfer in the lead, the school produced the first examples of independent landscape art in the West (nearly 1,000 years after China), in both paintings and prints. Their religious paintings had an expressionist style somewhat similar to Grünewald's. Dürer's pupils Hans Burgkmair and Hans Baldung Grien worked largely in prints, with Baldung developing the topical subject matter of witches in a number of enigmatic prints.

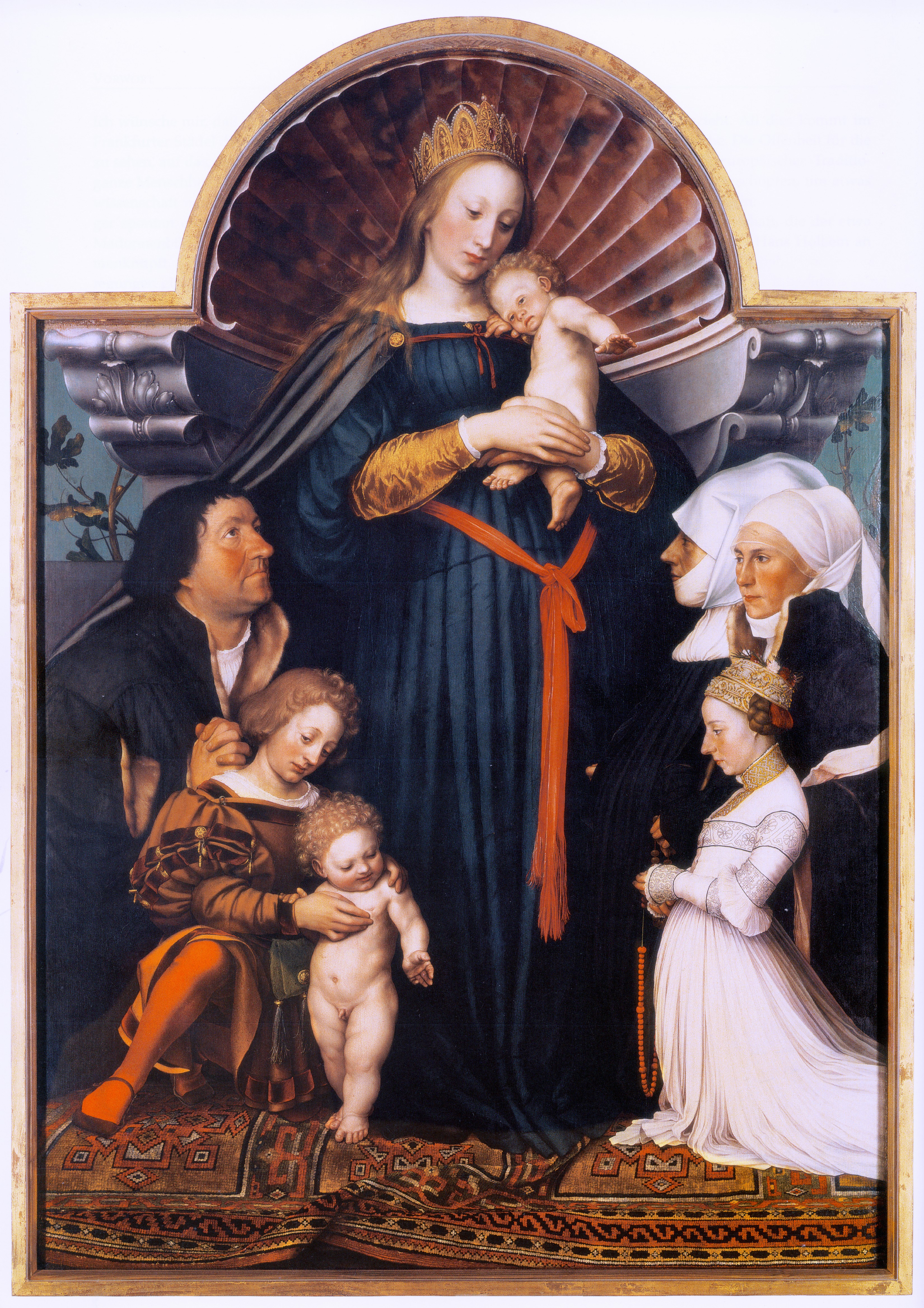
Darmstadt Madonna, with donor portraits, oil painting by Hans Holbein the Younger, on a Holbein carpet, 1525–26 and 1528. Oil and tempera on limewood, Würth Collection, Schwäbisch Hall.

Hans Holbein the Elder and his brother Sigismund Holbein painted religious works in the late Gothic style. Hans the Elder was a pioneer and leader in the transformation of German art from the Gothic to the Renaissance style. His son, Hans Holbein the Younger was an important painter of portraits and a few religious works, working mainly in England and Switzerland. Holbein's well known series of small woodcuts on the Dance of Death relate to the works of the Little Masters, a group of printmakers who specialized in very small and highly detailed engravings for bourgeois collectors, including many erotic subjects.

The outstanding achievements of the first half of the 16th century were followed by several decades with a remarkable absence of noteworthy German art, other than accomplished portraits that never rival the achievement of Holbein or Dürer. The next significant German artists worked in the rather artificial style of Northern Mannerism, which they had to learn in Italy or Flanders. Hans von Aachen and the Netherlandish Bartholomeus Spranger were the leading painters at the Imperial courts in Vienna and Prague, and the productive Netherlandish Sadeler family of engravers spread out across Germany, among other countries. This style was continued for another generation by Bartholomeus Strobel, an example of an essentially German artist born and working in Silesia, in today's Poland, until he emigrated to escape the Thirty Years War and become painter at the Polish court. Adam Elsheimer, the most influential German artist in the 17th century, spent his whole mature career in Italy, where he began by working for another émigré Hans Rottenhammer. Both produced highly finished cabinet paintings, mostly on copper, with classical themes and landscape backgrounds.

== Gothic and Renaissance sculpture ==
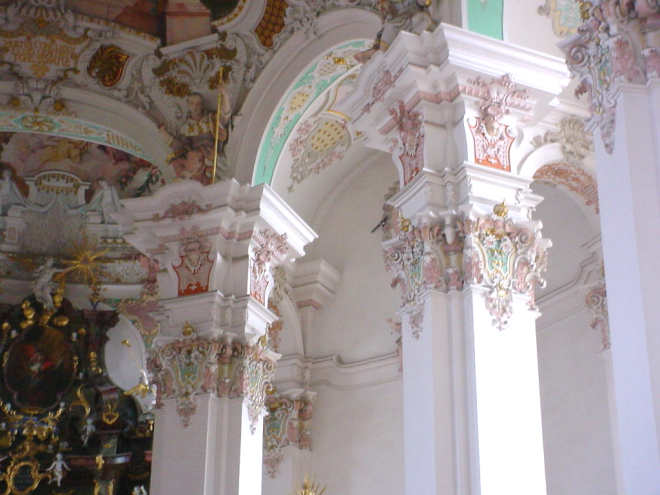
Wessobrunner stucco at Schussenried Abbey

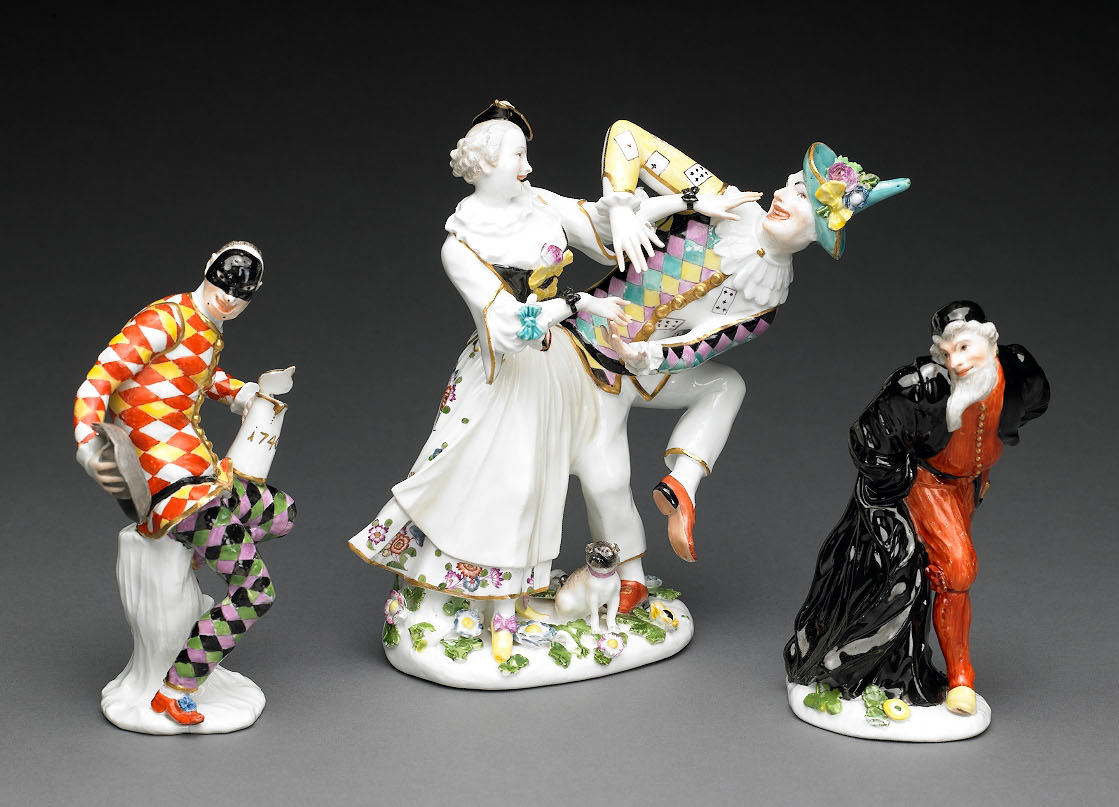
Meissen porcelain figures, c. 1740, 1744, 1735, modelled by Johann Joachim Kändler

In Catholic parts of South Germany the Gothic tradition of wood carving continued to flourish until the end of the 18th century, adapting to changes in style through the centuries. Veit Stoss (d. 1533), Tilman Riemenschneider (d.1531) and Peter Vischer the Elder (d. 1529) were Dürer's contemporaries, and their long careers covered the transition between the Gothic and Renaissance periods, although their ornament often remained Gothic even after their compositions began to reflect Renaissance principles.

Two and a half centuries later, Johann Joseph Christian and Ignaz Günther were leading masters in the late Baroque period, both dying in the late 1770s, barely a decade before the French Revolution. A vital element in the effect of German Baroque interiors was the work of the Wessobrunner School, a later term for the stuccoists of the late 17th and 18th centuries. Another manifestation of German sculptural skill was in porcelain; the most famous modeller is Johann Joachim Kaendler of the Meissen factory in Dresden, but the best work of Franz Anton Bustelli for the Nymphenburg Porcelain Manufactory in Munich is often considered the greatest achievement of 18th-century porcelain.

== 17th to 19th-century painting ==
=== Baroque, Rococo and Neoclassicism ===
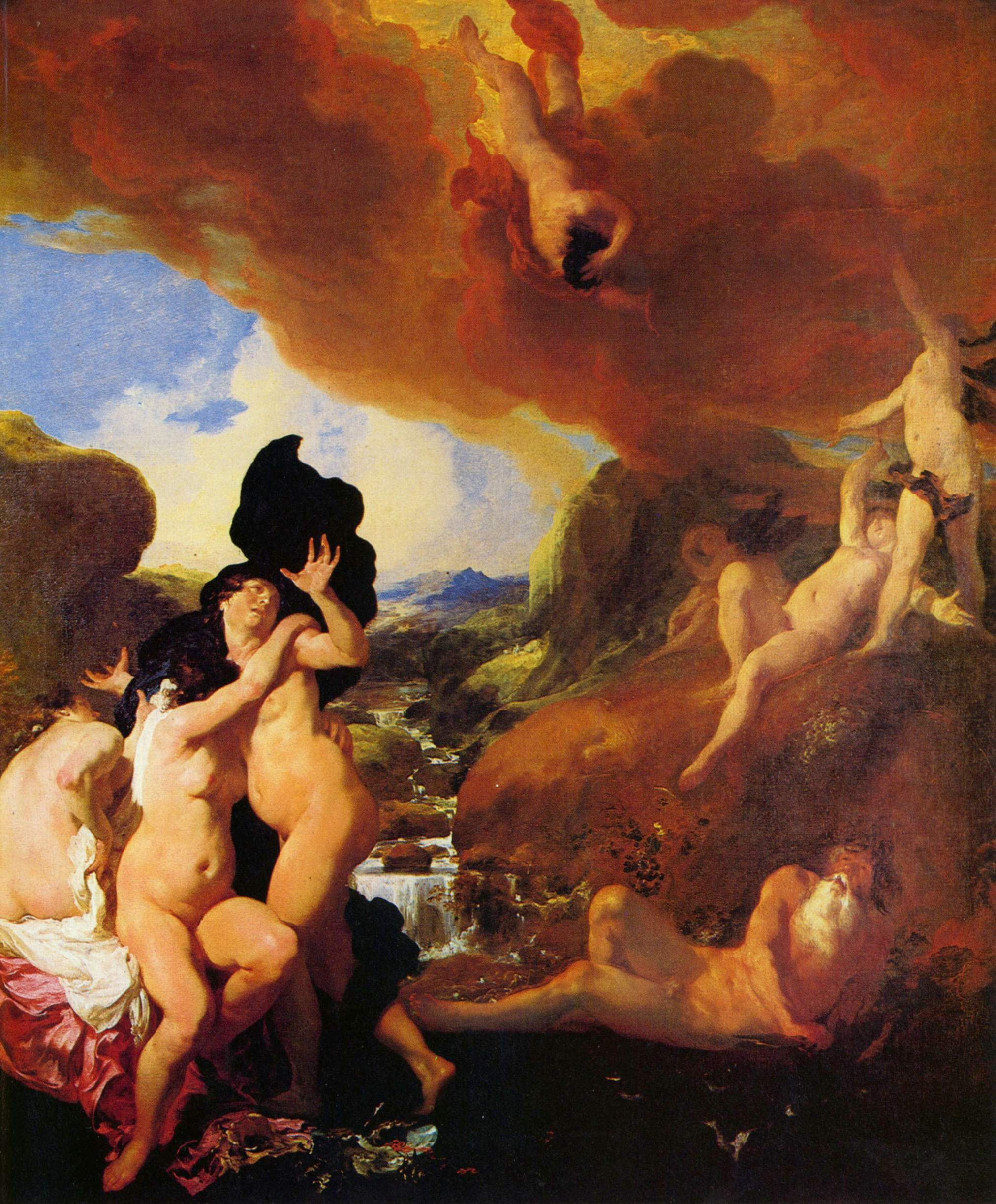
The Fall of Phaeton by Johann Liss

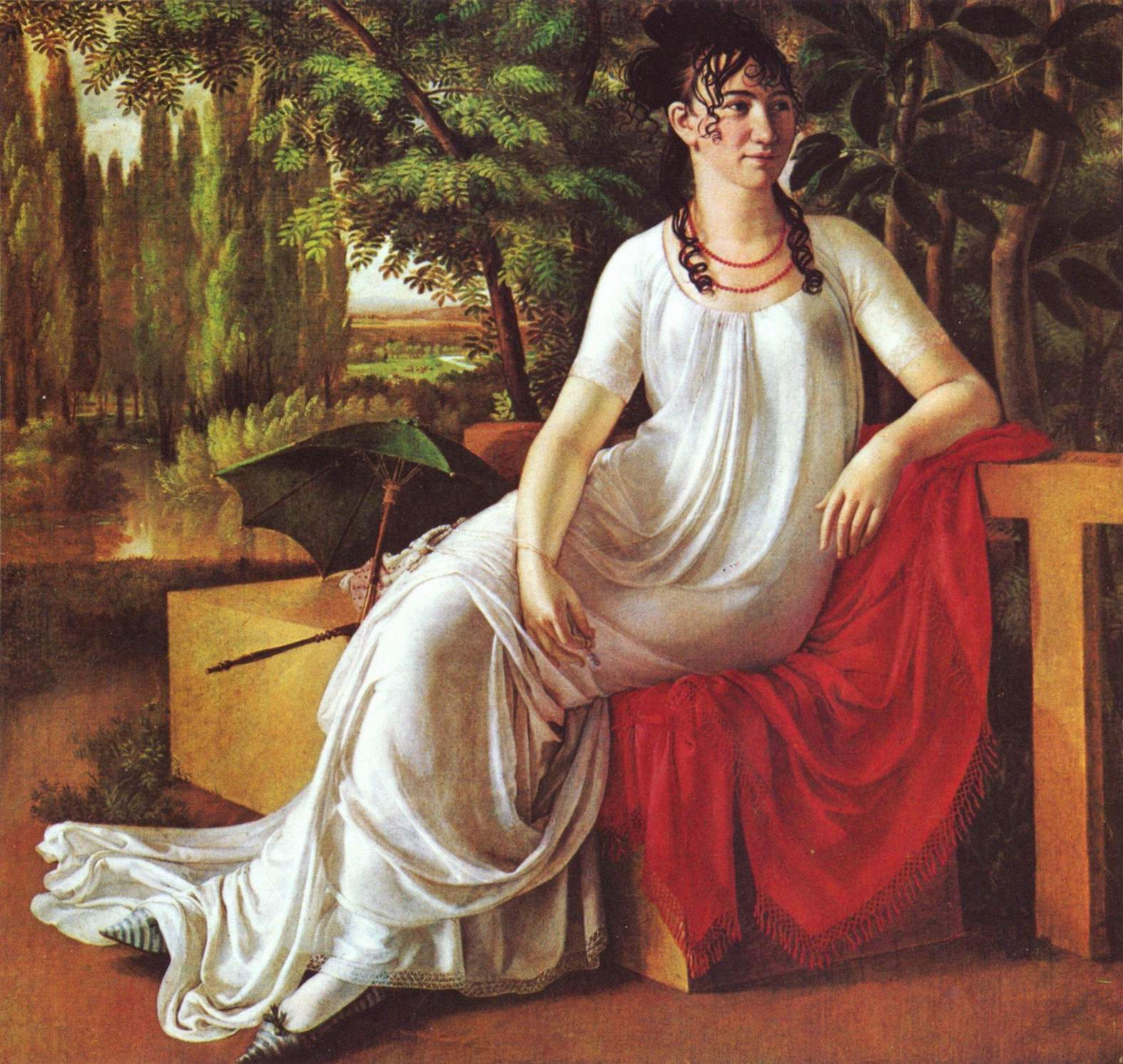
Gottlieb Schick, Frau von Cotta, 1802

Baroque painting was slow to arrive in Germany, with very little before about 1650, but once established seems to have suited German taste well. Baroque and Rococo periods saw German art producing mostly works derivative of developments elsewhere, though numbers of skilled artists in various genres were active. The period remains little-known outside Germany, and though it "never made any claim to be among the great schools of painting", its neglect by non-German art history remains striking. Many distinguished foreign painters spent periods working in Germany for princes, among them Bernardo Bellotto in Dresden and elsewhere, and Gianbattista Tiepolo, who spent three years painting the Würzburg Residence with his son. Many German painters worked abroad, including Johann Liss who worked mainly in Venice, Joachim von Sandrart and Ludolf Bakhuisen, the leading marine artist of the final years of Dutch Golden Age painting. In the late 18th century the portraitist Heinrich Füger and his pupil Johann Peter Krafft, whose best known works are three large murals in the Hofburg, had both moved to Vienna as students and stayed there.

Neoclassicism, which was born largely thanks to the writings of Johann Joachim Winckelmann, appears rather earlier in Germany than in France, with Anton Raphael Mengs (1728–79), the Danish painter Asmus Jacob Carstens (1754–98), and the sculptor Gottfried Schadow (1764–1850). Mengs was one of the most highly regarded artists of his day, working in Rome, Madrid and elsewhere, and finding an early Neo-Classical style that now seems rather effete, although his portraits are more effective. Carstens' shorter career was turbulent and troubled, leaving a trail of unfinished works, but through pupils and friends such as Gottlieb Schick, Joseph Anton Koch and Bonaventura Genelli, more influential. Koch was born in the mountains of the Austrian Tyrol and became the leading Continental painter of landscapes, concentrating on mountain views, despite spending much of his career in Rome.

Daniel Chodowiecki was born in Danzig, and at least partly identified as Polish, although he only spoke German and French. His paintings and hundreds of prints, book illustrations and political cartoons are an invaluable visual record of the everyday life and the increasingly complex mentality of Enlightenment Germany, and its emerging Nationalism. The Swiss-born Anton Graff was a prolific portraitist in Dresden, who painted literary figures as well as the court. The Tischbein family dynasty were solid all-rounders who covered most of the 18th century between them, as did the Zick family, initially mainly painters of grand Baroque ceilings, who were still active in the 20th century in the person of the illustrator Alexander Zick. Both the Asam brothers, and Johann Baptist Zimmermann and his brother, were able between them to provide a complete service for commissions for churches and palaces, designing the building and executing the stucco and wall-paintings. The combined effect of all the elements of these buildings in South Germany, Austria and Bohemia, especially their interiors, represent some of the most complete and extreme realizations of the Baroque aspiration to overwhelm the viewer with the "radiant fairy world of the nobleman's dwelling", or the "foretaste of the glories of Paradise" in the case of churches.

The earliest German academy was the Akademie der Künste founded in Berlin in 1696, and through the next two centuries a number of other cities established their own institutions, in parallel with developments in other European nations. In Germany the uncertain market for art in a country divided into a multitude of small states meant that significant German artists have been to the present day more likely to accept teaching posts in the academies and their successor institutions than their equivalents in England or France have been. In general German academies imposed a particular style less rigidly than was for long the case in Paris, London, Moscow or elsewhere.

=== Writing about art ===
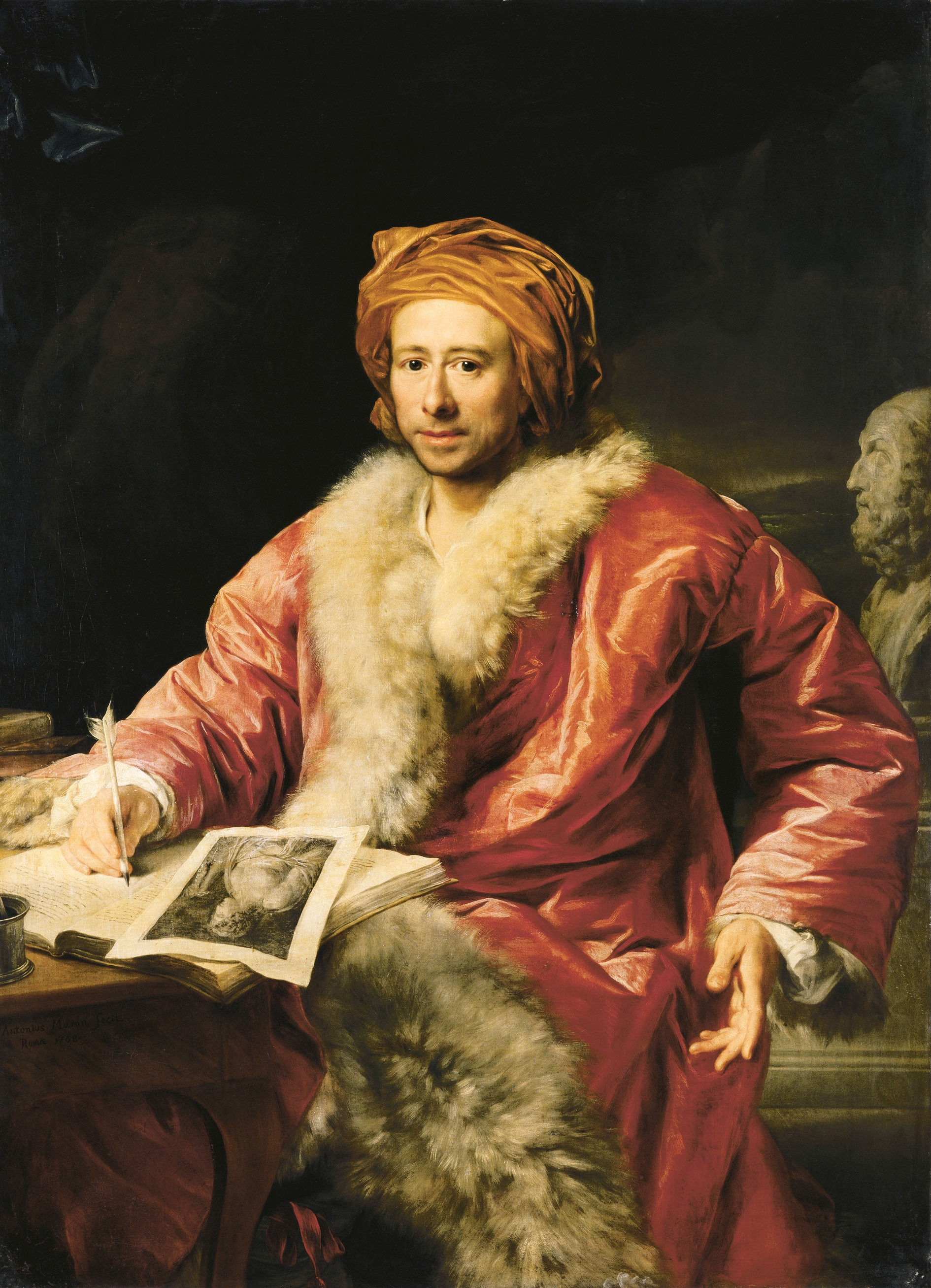
Anton von Maron, Portrait of Johann Joachim Winckelmann, 1768

The Enlightenment period saw German writers becoming leading theorists and critics of art, led by Johann Joachim Winckelmann, who exalted Ancient Greek art and, despite never visiting Greece or actually seeing many Ancient Greek statues, set out an analysis distinguishing between the main periods of Ancient Greek art, and relating them to wider historical movements. Winckelmann's work marked the entry of art history into the high-philosophical discourse of German culture; he was read avidly by Goethe and Friedrich Schiller, both of whom began to write on the history of art, and his account of the Laocoön Group occasioned a response by Lessing. Goethe had tried to train as an artist, and his landscape sketches show "occasional flashes of emotion in the presence of nature which are quite isolated in the period".

The emergence of art as a major subject of philosophical speculation was solidified by the appearance of Immanuel Kant's Critique of Judgment in 1790, and was furthered by Hegel's Lectures on Aesthetics. In the following century, German universities were the first to teach art history as an academic subject, beginning the leading position that Germany (and Austria) was to occupy in the study of art history until the dispersal of scholars abroad in the Nazi period. Johann Gottfried Herder championed what he identified in the Gothic and Dürer as specifically Germanic styles, beginning an argument over the proper models for a German artist against the so-called "Tyranny of Greece over Germany" that would last nearly two centuries.

=== Romanticism and the Nazarenes ===
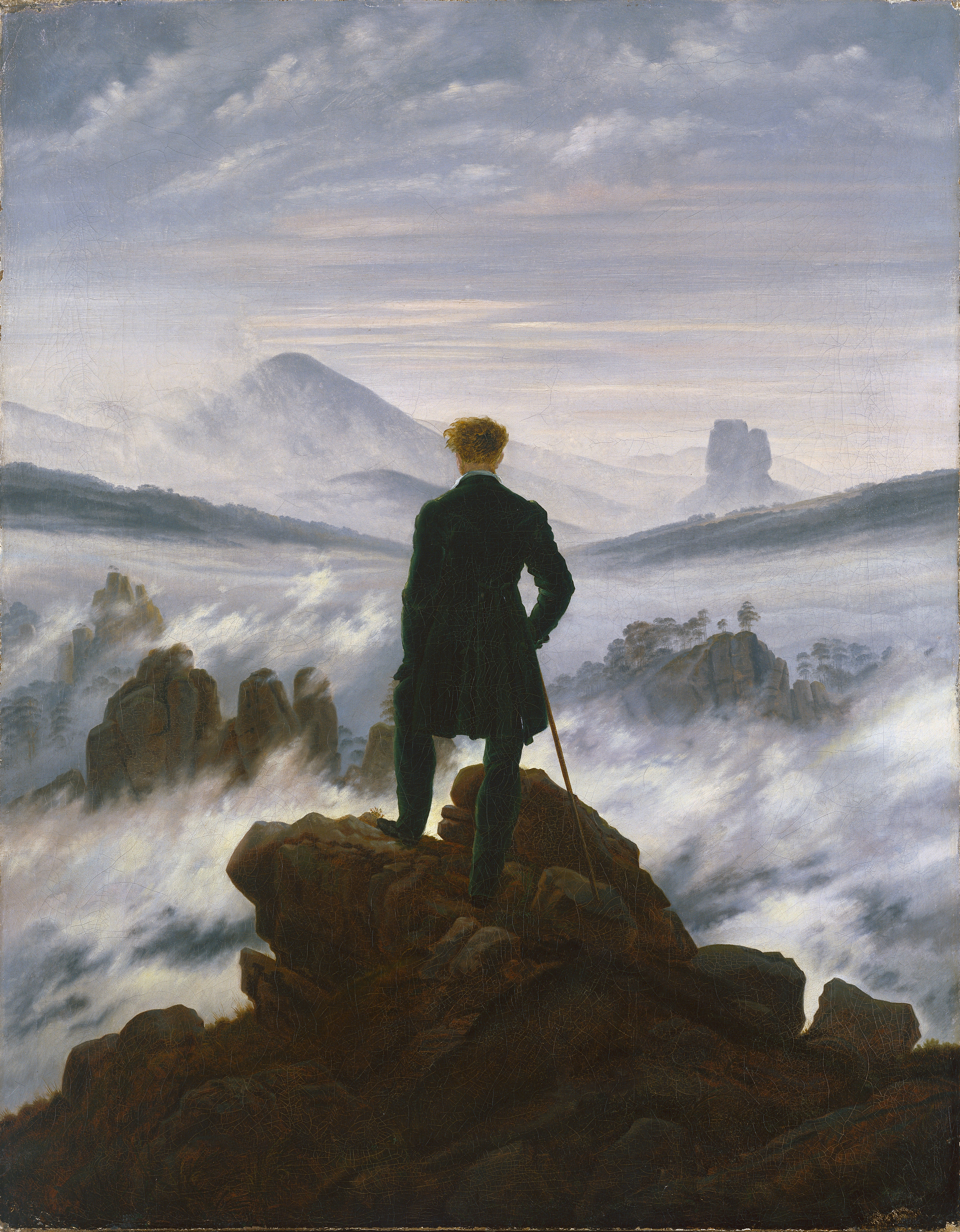
Caspar David Friedrich, Wanderer above the Sea of Fog (1818)

German Romanticism saw a revival of innovation and distinctiveness in German art. Outside Germany only Caspar David Friedrich is well-known, but there were a number of artists with very individual styles, notably Philipp Otto Runge, who like Friedrich had trained at the Copenhagen Academy and was forgotten after his death until a revival in the 20th century. Friedrich painted almost entirely landscapes, with a distinctive Northern feel, and always a feeling of quasi-religious stillness. Often his figures are seen from behind – they like the viewer are lost in contemplation of the landscape. Runge's portraits, mostly of his own circle, are naturalistic except for his huge-faced children, but the other works in his brief career increasingly reflected a visionary pantheism. Adrian Ludwig Richter is mainly remembered for his portraits, and Carl Wilhelm Kolbe was purely an etcher (as well as a philologist), whose later prints show figures almost swallowed up by gigantic vegetation.

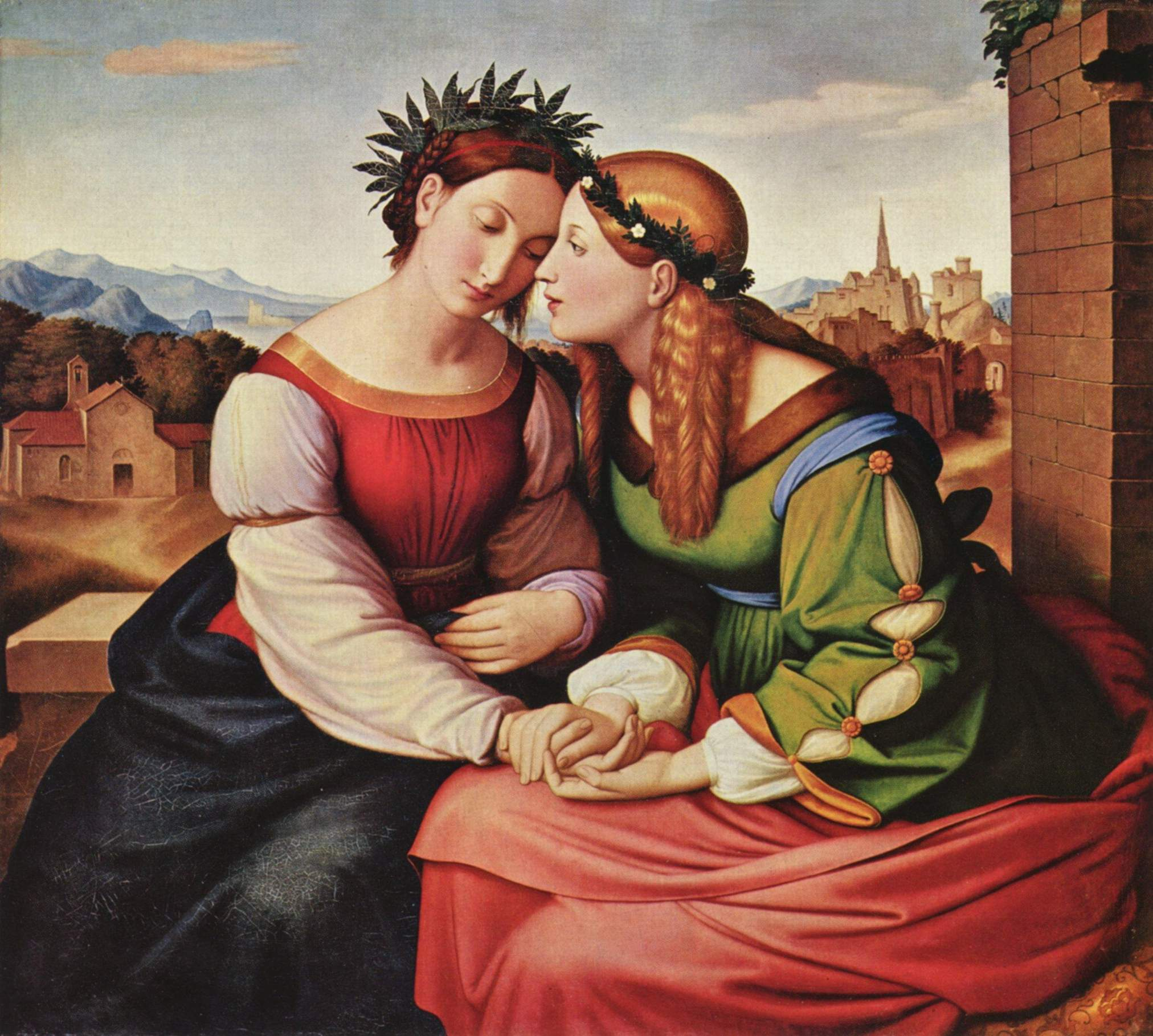
Johann Friedrich Overbeck of the Nazarene movement, Italia und Germania

The Nazarene movement, the coinage of a mocking critic, denotes a group of early 19th-century German Romantic painters who aimed to revive honesty and spirituality in Christian art. The principal motivation of the Nazarenes was a reaction against Neoclassicism and the routine art education of the academy system. They hoped to return to art which embodied spiritual values, and sought inspiration in artists of the late Middle Ages and early Renaissance, rejecting what they saw as the superficial virtuosity of later art. Their programme was not dissimilar to that of the English Pre-Raphaelite Brotherhood in the 1850s, although the core group took it as far as wearing special pseudo-medieval clothing. In 1810 Johann Friedrich Overbeck, Franz Pforr, Ludwig Vogel and the Swiss Johann Konrad Hottinger moved to Rome, where they occupied the abandoned monastery of San Isidoro. They were joined by Philipp Veit, Peter von Cornelius, Julius Schnorr von Carolsfeld, Friedrich Wilhelm Schadow and a loose grouping of other German artists. They met up with the Austrian romantic landscape artist Joseph Anton Koch, (1768–1839) who became an unofficial tutor to the group. In 1827 they were joined by Joseph von Führich, and Eberhard Wächter was later associated with the group. Unlike the strong support given to the Pre-Raphaelites by the dominant art critic of the day, John Ruskin, Goethe was dismissive of the Nazarenes: "This is the first case in the history of art when real talents have taken the fancy to form themselves backwards by retreating into their mother's womb, and thus found a new epoch in art."

Led by the Nazarene Schadow, son of the sculptor, the Düsseldorf school was a group of artists who painted mostly landscapes, and who studied at, or were influenced by the Düsseldorf Academy, founded in 1767. The academy's influence grew in the 1830s and 1840s, and it had many American students, several of whom became associated with the Hudson River School.

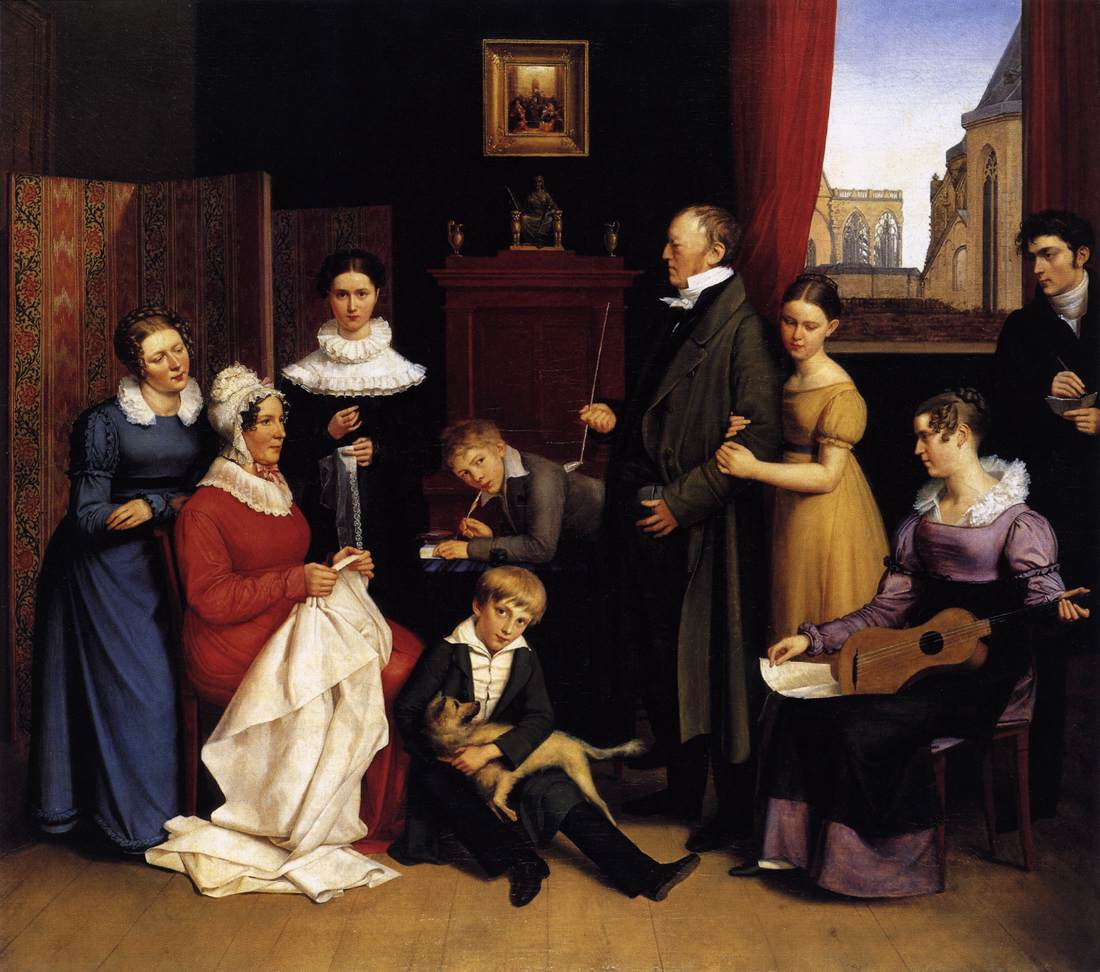
The family of the painter Carl Begas, 1808, celebrating domesticity in Biedermeier style

=== Naturalism and beyond ===
Biedermeier refers to a style in literature, music, the visual arts and interior design in the period between the end of the Napoleonic Wars in 1815 and the revolutions of 1848. Biedermeier art appealed to the prosperous middle classes by detailed but polished realism, often celebrating domestic virtues, and came to dominate over French-leaning aristocratic tastes, as well as the yearnings of Romanticism. Carl Spitzweg was a leading German artist in the style. The Zimmerbild or "portrait" of an empty room, became a popular form.

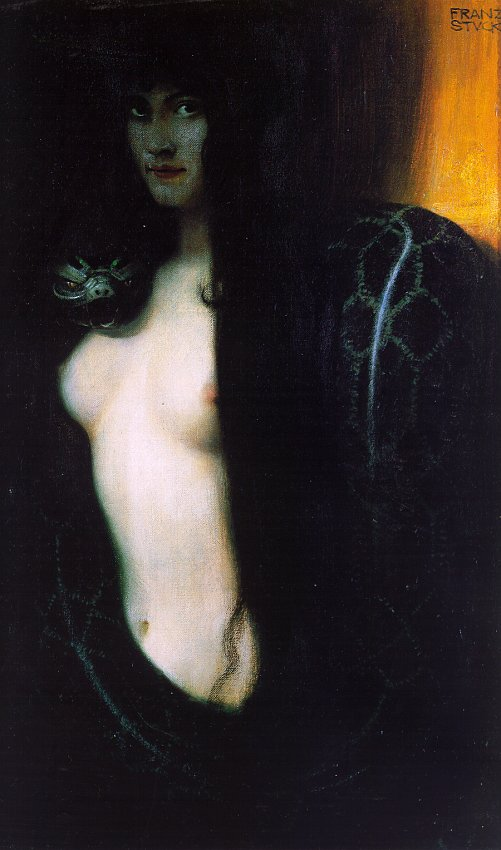
Franz Stuck (1873) Sünde (Sin)

In the second half of the 19th century a number of styles developed, paralleling trends in other European countries, though the lack of a dominant capital city probably contributed to even more diversity of styles than in other countries.

Adolph Menzel enjoyed enormous popularity both among the German public and officialdom; at his funeral Wilhelm II, German Emperor walked behind his coffin. He dramaticised past and contemporary Prussian military successes both in paintings and brilliant wood engravings illustrating books, yet his domestic subjects are intimate and touching. He followed the development of early Impressionism to create a style that he used for depicting grand public occasions, among other subjects like his Studio Wall. Karl von Piloty was a leading academic painter of history subjects in the latter part of the century who taught in Munich; among his more famous pupils were Hans Makart, Franz von Lenbach, Franz Defregger, Gabriel von Max and Eduard von Grützner. The term "Munich school" is used both of German and of Greek painting, after Greeks like Georgios Jakobides studied under him. Piloty's most influential pupil was Wilhelm Leibl. Being the head of the so called Leibl-Circle, an informal group of artists with a non-academic approach to art, he had a great impact on Realism in Germany.

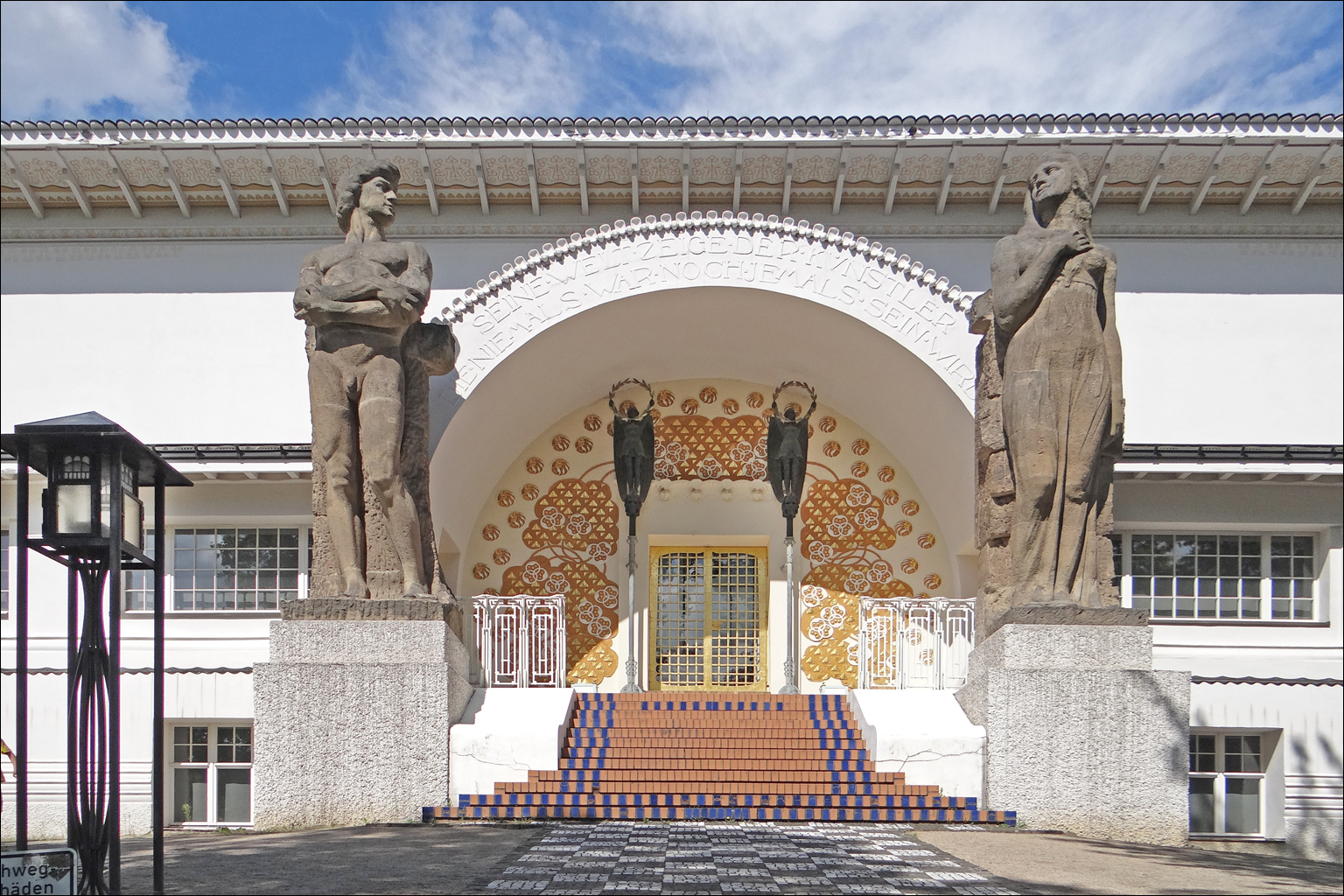
Ernst Ludwig House in Darmstadt Artists' Colony, Darmstadt, Germany, by Joseph Maria Olbrich (1900)

The Berlin Secession was a group founded in 1898 by painters including Max Liebermann, who broadly shared the artistic approach of Manet and the French Impressionists, and Lovis Corinth then still painting in a naturalistic style. The group survived until the 1930s, despite splits, and its regular exhibitions helped launch the next two generations of Berlin artists, without imposing a particular style. Near the end of the century, the Benedictine Beuron Art School developed a style, mostly for religious murals, in rather muted colours, with a medievalist interest in pattern that drew from Les Nabis and in some ways looked forward to Art Nouveau or the Jugendstil ("Youth Style") as it is known in German. Franz von Stuck and Max Klinger are the leading German Symbolist painters.

== 20th century ==
=== Expressionism and the Bauhaus ===
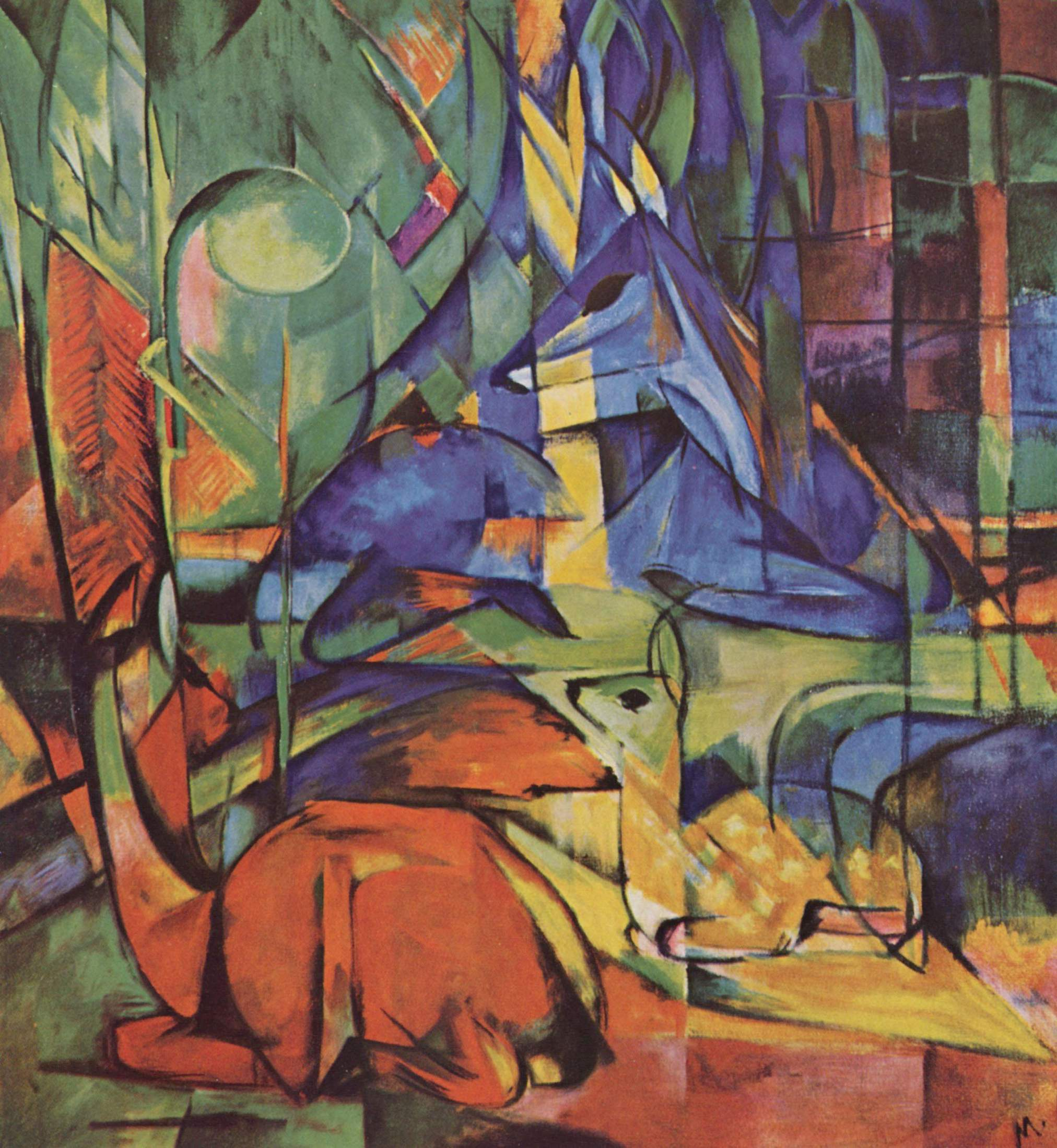
Rehe im Walde ("Roe deer in the forest") by Franz Marc, 1914

Even more than in other countries, German art in the early 20th century developed through a number of loose groups and movements, many covering other artistic media as well, and often with a specific political element, as with the Arbeitsrat für Kunst and November Group, both formed in 1918. In 1922 The November Group, the Dresden Secession, Das Junge Rheinland, and several other progressive groups formed a "Cartel of advanced artistic groups in Germany" (Kartell fortschrittlicher Künstlergruppen in Deutschland) in an effort to gain exposure.

Die Brücke ("The Bridge") was one of two groups of German painters fundamental to expressionism, the other being Der Blaue Reiter group. Die Brücke was a group of German expressionist artists formed in Dresden in 1905 by architecture students who wanted to be painters: Fritz Bleyl (1880–1966), Erich Heckel (1883–1970), Ernst Ludwig Kirchner (1880–1938) and Karl Schmidt-Rottluff (1884–1976), with Max Pechstein and others later joining. The notoriously individualistic Emil Nolde (1867–1956) was briefly a member of Die Brücke, but was at odds with the younger members of the group. Die Brücke moved to Berlin in 1911, where it eventually dissolved in 1913. Perhaps their most important contribution had been the rediscovery of the woodcut as a valid medium for original artistic expression.

Der Blaue Reiter ("The Blue Rider") formed in Munich, Germany in 1911. Wassily Kandinsky, Franz Marc, August Macke, Alexej von Jawlensky, Marianne von Werefkin and others founded the group in response to the rejection of Kandinsky's painting Last Judgment from an exhibition by Neue Künstlervereinigung—another artists' group of which Kandinsky had been a member. The name Der Blaue Reiter derived from Marc's enthusiasm for horses, and from Kandinsky's love of the colour blue. For Kandinsky, blue is the colour of spirituality—the darker the blue, the more it awakens human desire for the eternal (see his 1911 book On the Spiritual in Art). Kandinsky had also titled a painting Der Blaue Reiter (see illustration) in 1903. The intense sculpture and printmaking of Käthe Kollwitz was strongly influenced by Expressionism, which also formed the starting point for the young artists who went on to join other tendencies within the movements of the early 20th century.

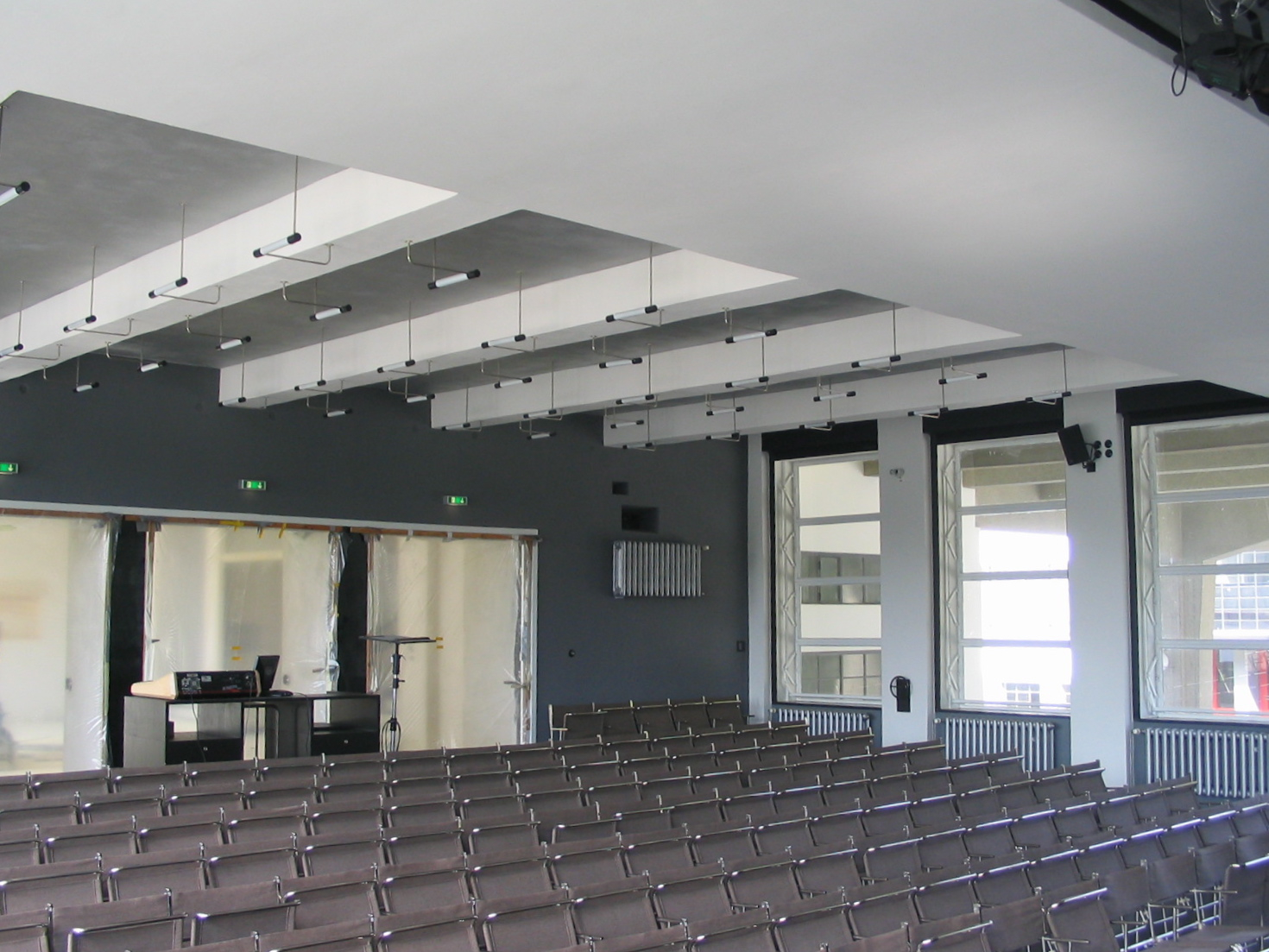
A room of the Bauhaus campus, Dessau: the Bauhaus was especially interested in the Gesamtkunstwerk.

Die Brücke and Der Blaue Reiter were both examples of tendency of early 20th-century German art to be "honest, direct, and spiritually engaged" The difference in how the two groups attempted this were telling, however. The artists of Der Blaue Reiter were less oriented towards intense expression of emotion and more towards theory- a tendency which would lead Kandinsky to pure abstraction. Still, it was the spiritual and symbolic properties of abstract form that were important. There were therefore Utopian tones to Kandinsky's abstractions: "We have before us an age of conscious creation, and this new spirit in painting is going hand in hand with thoughts toward an epoch of greater spirituality." Die Brücke also had Utopian tendencies, but took the medieval craft guild as a model of cooperative work that could better society- "Everyone who with directness and authenticity conveys that which drives him to creation belongs to us". The Bauhaus also shared these Utopian leanings, seeking to combine fine and applied arts (Gesamtkunstwerk) with a view towards creating a better society.

=== Weimar period; Dada and beyond ===
Made in Germany (German: Den macht uns keiner nach), by George Grosz, drawn in pen 1919, photo-lithograph 1920

Hannah Höch, Cut with the Kitchen Knife through the Last Epoch of Weimar Beer-Belly Culture in Germany, 1919, collage of pasted papers, 90×144 cm, Nationalgalerie, Staatliche Museen zu Berlin

A major feature of German art in the early 20th century until 1933 was a boom in the production of works of art of a grotesque style. Artists using the Satirical-Grotesque genre included George Grosz, Otto Dix and Max Beckmann, at least in their works of the 1920s. Dada in Germany, the leading practitioners of which were Kurt Schwitters and Hannah Höch, was centered in Berlin, where it tended to be more politically oriented than Dada groups elsewhere. They made important contributions to the development of collage as a medium for political commentary- Schwitters later developed his Merzbau, a forerunner of installation art. Dix and Grosz were also associated with the Berlin Dada group. Max Ernst led a Dada group in Cologne, where he also practiced collage, but with a greater interest in Gothic fantasy than in overt political content—this hastened his transition into surrealism, of which he became the leading German practitioner. The Swiss-born Paul Klee, Lyonel Feininger and others experimented with cubism.

The New Objectivity, or Neue Sachlichkeit (new matter-of-factness), was an art movement which arose in Germany during the 1920s as an outgrowth of, and in opposition to, expressionism. It is thus post-expressionist and applied to works of visual art as well as literature, music, and architecture. It describes the stripped-down, simplified building style of the Bauhaus and the Weissenhof Settlement, the urban planning and public housing projects of Bruno Taut and Ernst May, and the industrialization of the household typified by the Frankfurt kitchen. Grosz and Dix were leading figures, forming the "Verist" side of the movement with Beckmann and Christian Schad, Rudolf Schlichter, Georg Scholz (in his early work), Elfriede Lohse-Wächtler, and Karl Hubbuch. The other tendency is sometimes called Magic Realism, and included Anton Räderscheidt, Georg Schrimpf, Alexander Kanoldt, and Carl Grossberg. Unlike some of the other groupings, the Neue Sachlichkeit was never a formal group, and its artists were associated with other groups; the term was invented by a sympathetic curator, and "Magic Realism" by an art critic.

Plakatstil, "poster style" in German, was an early style of poster design that began in the early 20th century, using bold, straight fonts with very simple designs, in contrast to Art Nouveau posters. Lucian Bernhard was a leading figure.

=== Art in the Third Reich ===
The Nazi regime banned modern art, which they condemned as degenerate art (from the German: entartete Kunst). According to Nazi ideology, modern art deviated from the prescribed norm of classical beauty. While the 1920s to 1940s are considered the heyday of modern art movements, there were conflicting nationalistic movements that resented abstract art, and Germany was no exception. Avant-garde German artists were now branded both enemies of the state and a threat to the German nation. Many went into exile, with relatively few returning after World War II. Dix was one who remained, being conscripted into the Volkssturm Home Guard militia; Pechstein kept his head down in rural Pomerania. Nolde also stayed, creating his "unpainted pictures" in secret after being forbidden to paint. Beckmann, Ernst, Grosz, Feininger and others went to America, Klee to Switzerland, where he died. Kirchner committed suicide.

In July, 1937, the Nazis mounted a polemical exhibition entitled Entartete Kunst (Degenerate art), in Munich; it subsequently travelled to eleven other cities in Germany and Austria. The show was intended as an official condemnation of modern art, and included over 650 paintings, sculptures, prints, and books from the collections of thirty two German museums. Expressionism, which had its origins in Germany, had the largest proportion of paintings represented. Simultaneously, and with much pageantry, the Nazis presented the Grosse deutsche Kunstausstellung (Great German art exhibition) at the palatial Haus der deutschen Kunst (House of German Art). This exhibition displayed the work of officially approved artists such as Arno Breker and Adolf Wissel. At the end of four months Entartete Kunst had attracted over two million visitors, nearly three and a half times the number that visited the nearby Grosse deutsche Kunstausstellung.

== Post-World War II art ==
=== Neo-expressionism, Richter and Socialist realism ===
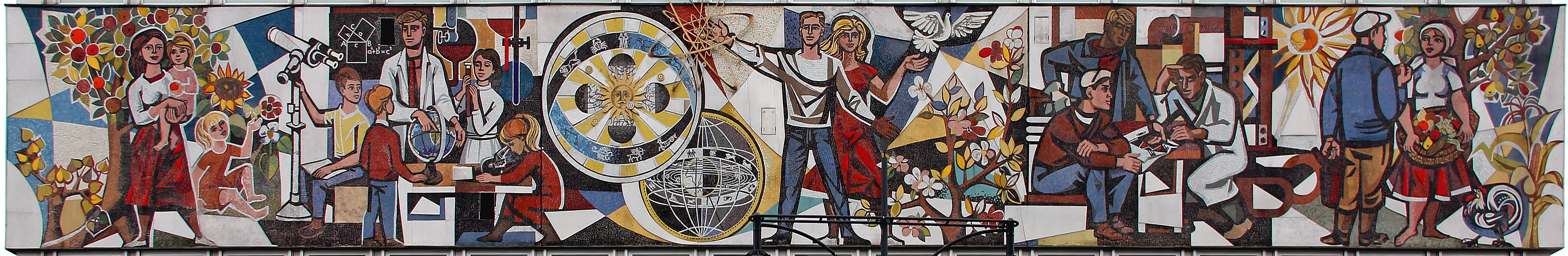
Walter Womacka, Our Life, socialist realist mosaic from East Berlin, 1964

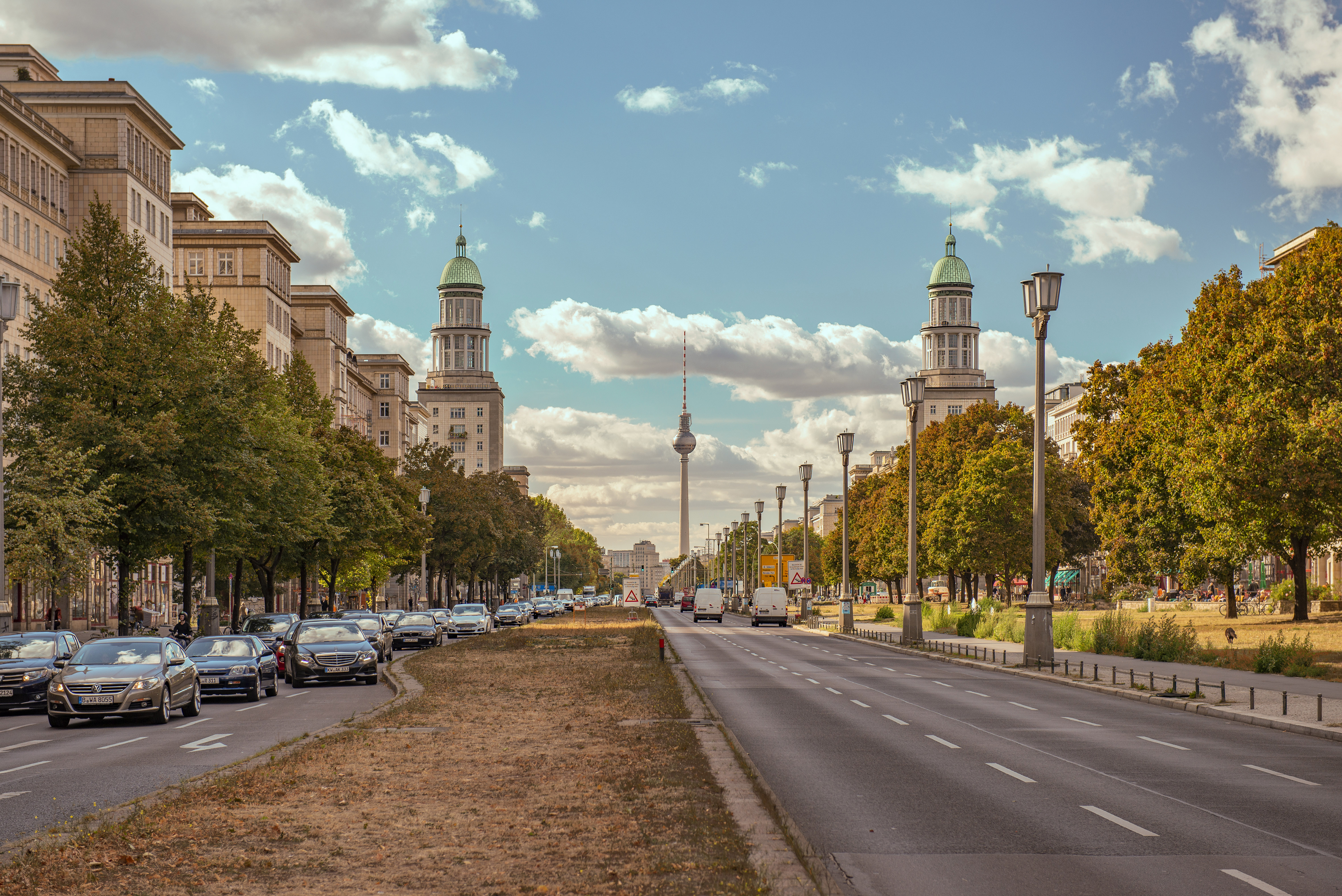
Karl-Marx-Allee

Post-war art trends in Germany can broadly be divided into Socialist realism in the DDR (communist East Germany), and in West Germany a variety of largely international movements including Neo-expressionism and Conceptualism.

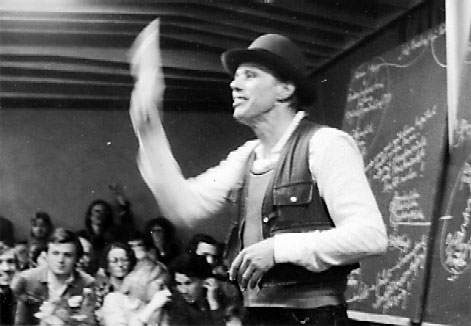
Joseph Beuys, wearing his ubiquitous fedora, delivers a lecture on his theory of social sculpture, 1978.

Notable socialist realism include or included Walter Womacka, Willi Sitte, Werner Tübke and Bernhard Heisig.

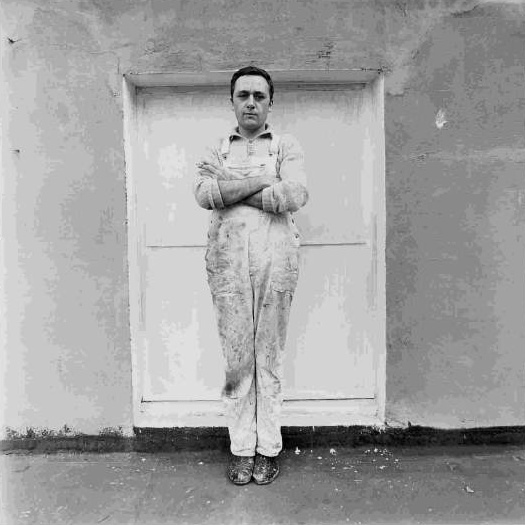
Gerhard Richter c. 1970, photograph by Lothar Wolleh

Especially notable neo-expressionists include or included Georg Baselitz, Anselm Kiefer, Jörg Immendorff, A. R. Penck, Markus Lüpertz, Peter Robert Keil and Rainer Fetting. Other notable artists who work with traditional media or figurative imagery include Martin Kippenberger, Gerhard Richter, Sigmar Polke, and Neo Rauch.

Leading German conceptual artists include or included Bernd and Hilla Becher, Hanne Darboven, Hans-Peter Feldmann, Hans Haacke, and Charlotte Posenenske.

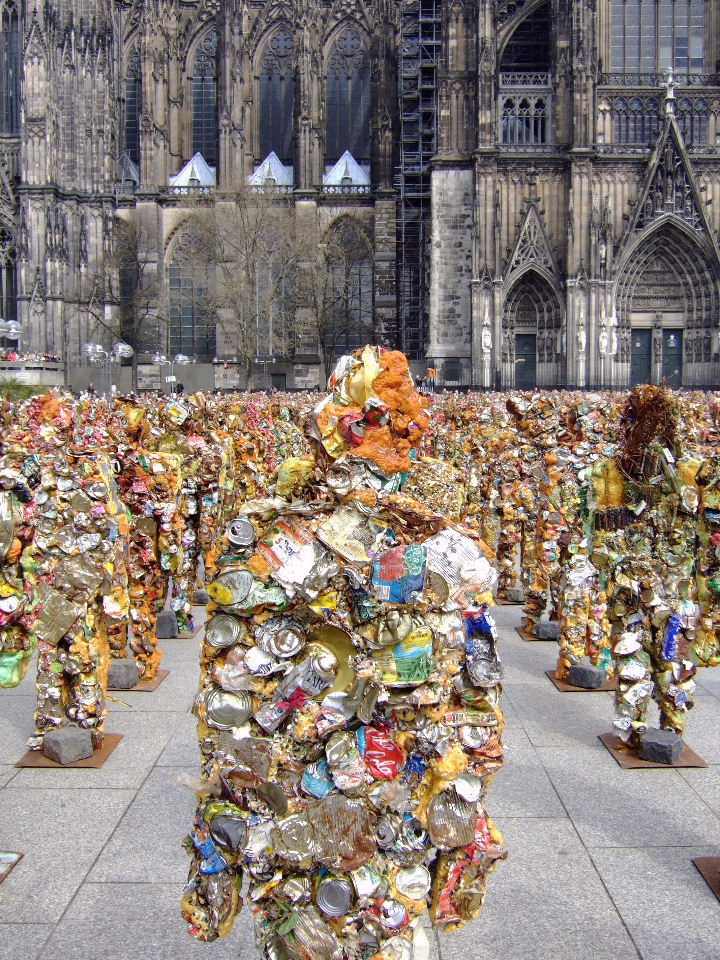
HA Schult, Trash People, shown in Cologne

=== Performance art, happenings, video art and Joseph Beuys ===
The Performance artist, sculptor, and theorist Joseph Beuys was perhaps the most influential German artist of the late 20th century. His main contribution to theory was the expansion of the Gesamtkunstwerk to include the whole of society, as expressed by his famous expression "Everyone is an artist". This expanded concept of art, known as social sculpture, defines everything that contributes creatively to society as artistic in nature. The form this took in his oeuvre varied from richly metaphoric, almost shamanistic performances based on his personal mythology (How to Explain Pictures to a Dead Hare, I Like America and America Likes Me) to more direct and utilitarian expressions, such as 7000 Oaks and his activities in the Green party.

Famous for their happenings are HA Schult and Wolf Vostell. Wolf Vostell is also known for his early installations with television. His first installations with television the Cycle Black Room from 1958 was shown in Wuppertal at the Galerie Parnass in 1963 and his installation 6 TV Dé-coll/age was shown at the Smolin Gallery in New York also in 1963.

The art group Gruppe SPUR included: Lothar Fischer (1933–2004), Heimrad Prem (1934–1978), Hans-Peter Zimmer (1936–1992) and Helmut Sturm (1932). The SPUR-artists met first at the Academy of Fine Arts, Munich and, before falling out with them, were associated with the Situationist International. Other groups include the Junge Wilde of the late 1970s to early 1980s.

=== German landscape painting after 1945 ===
Representational landscape painting in German post‑war art occupies a distinct position within artistic developments after 1945. In a period marked by profound political upheaval and uncertainty, the landscape became, for some artists, a space of projection for memory, loss, renewal, and social reflection. In the immediate aftermath of the Second World War, several artists returned to earlier realist, impressionist, and expressionist traditions. Landscapes often appeared wounded, barren, or devoid of human presence, reflecting the experiences of war and destruction. A significant representative of this tendency is Franz Radziwill, whose landscapes—positioned between Realism and Magic Realism—convey an oppressive, frequently apocalyptic atmosphere.

In the GDR, representational landscape painting developed under different political conditions. Some artists employed the genre to articulate personal or socially critical themes in an indirect manner. Particularly influential was the so‑called “Leipzig School,” whose principal figures, though primarily known for figurative compositions, frequently used landscape as a symbolically charged space. Wolfgang Mattheuer created landscapes that can be interpreted as emblems of inner conflict, political constraint, or ecological threat.

Werner Tübke integrated landscapes into his complex pictorial worlds, shaped by historical and allegorical layers. His detailed panoramas allude to art‑historical precedents and combine depictions of nature with social critique and reflections on history. Harald Metzkes, by contrast, developed a poetic and melancholic visual language in which landscapes often appear as quiet, timeless spaces that offer the viewer a contemplative distance from the present.

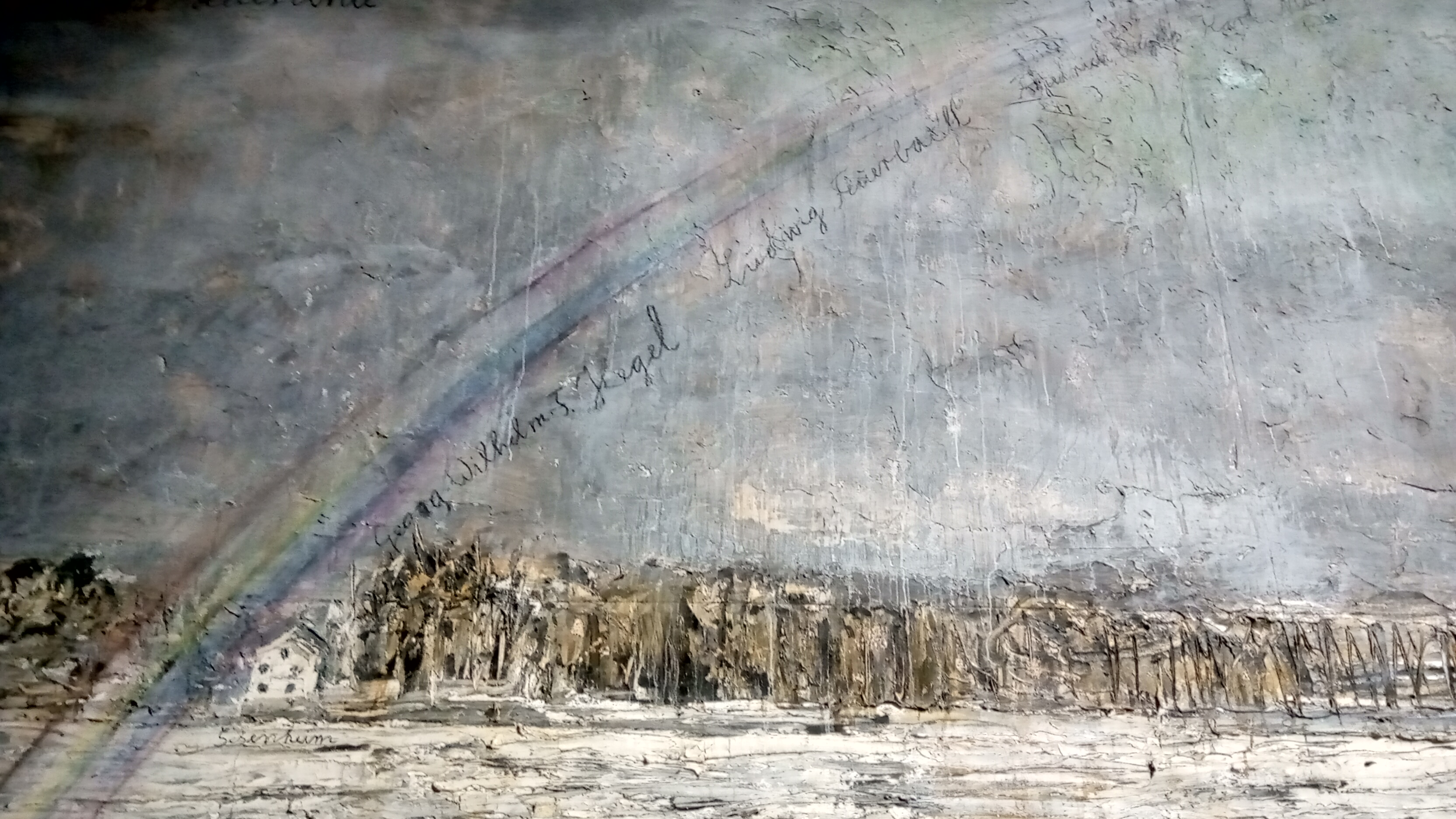
Anselm Kiefer - Pirelli HangarBicocca (Detail)

In West Germany, representational landscape painting remained overshadowed by abstraction for a long time, but from the 1960s onward it received new impulses. In his early landscape works, Gerhard Richter drew on photographic sources and transformed them through blurring into ambivalent pictorial spaces that hover between reality and memory. Anselm Kiefer later also employed landscape as a central motif, with his predominantly dark, materially dense depictions of German forests, fields, and ruins becoming carriers of collective memory, mythology, and the history of guilt.

In summary, representational landscape painting in German post‑war art was more than a continuation of traditional depictions of nature. It functioned as a mirror of social conditions, as a symbolic space for historical trauma, and as a means of individual self‑positioning, often against the unquestionably hegemoy of abstract movements.

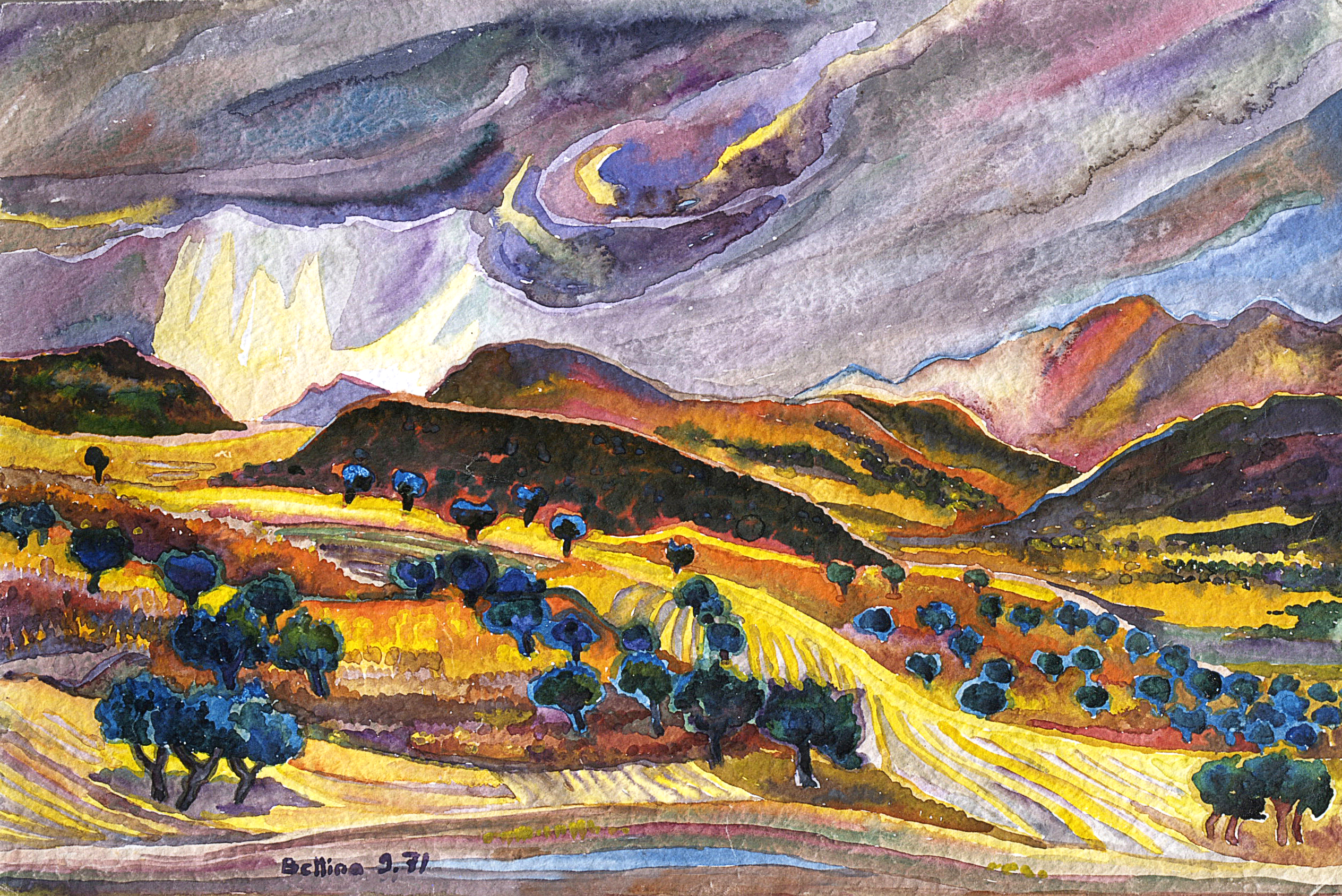
Bettina Heinen-Ayech, Summer thunderstorm in Algeria in 1974

Female artists also made important contributions in this context, though they long received less recognition. Among them are Ingrid Goltzsche‑Schwarz, Ida Kerkovius, Hal Busse, Gabriele Münter, Lotte Laserstein, and Bettina Heinen-Ayech, the latter associated with the Solingen artists’ colony and oriented toward figurative open‑air painting, en plein air, in the tradition of early‑19th‑century English landscape painting, the mid‑19th‑century Barbizon School, Impressionism, the Skagen Painters, and the Dachau Artists' Colony.

The work produced by the painter Lotte Laserstein after 1945 is likewise figurative. Living in exile in Sweden, she worked on commission, creating portraits, floral pieces, and landscapes. Gabriele Münter repeatedly returned to representational landscape painting in the post‑war period, alongside her abstract “improvisations.” After the end of the war, Ida Kerkovius also adopted a representational approach, producing travel impressions and floral still lifes.

=== Important institutions of the German art scene ===
documenta (sic) is a major exhibition of contemporary art held in Kassel every five years (2007, 2012...), Art Cologne is an annual art fair, again mostly for contemporary art, and Transmediale is an annual festival for art and digital culture, held in Berlin.

=== Important German contemporary artists ===
Other contemporary German artists include Jonathan Meese, Daniel Richter, Albert Oehlen, Markus Oehlen, Rosemarie Trockel, Andreas Gursky, Thomas Ruff, Blinky Palermo, Hans-Jürgen Schlieker, Günther Uecker, Aris Kalaizis, Katharina Fritsch, Fritz Schwegler, Thomas Schütte, Katharina Sieverding and Isa Genzken.
