= Master of the Malchin Altar =

German painter

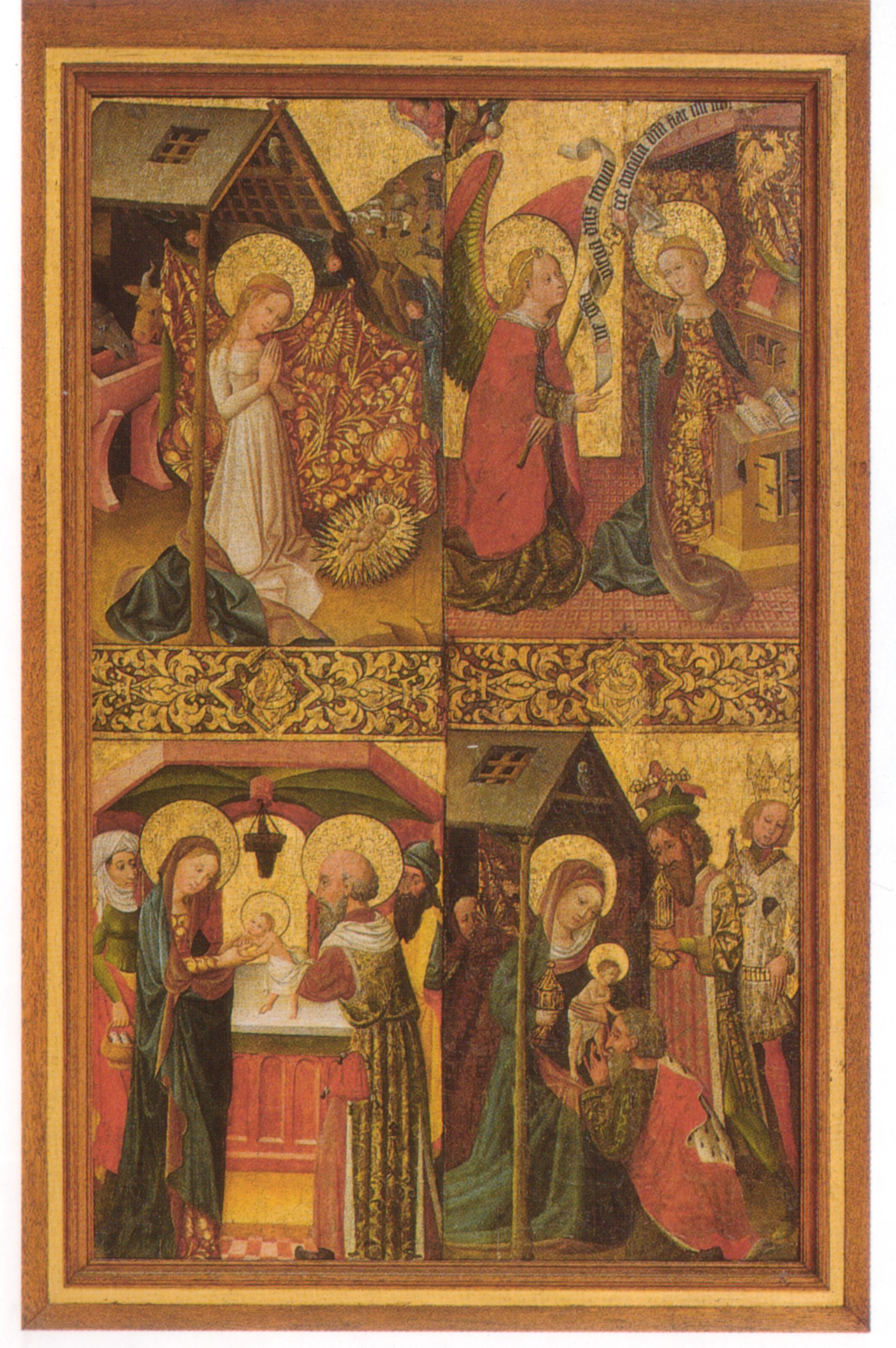
Wings of the Mary altar in the Rostock Church of Our Lady (c. 1430 - 40).

The Master of the Malchin Altar (German: Meister des Malchiner Altar) was a northern German Late Gothic painter who was active in Hamburg in the first half of the 15th century.

The master acquired his pseudonym from the panels he painted for the outer wings of the altar to Mary in the brick gothic cathedral of Saint John in Malchin. These paintings are similar in style to works by Master Francke, and were at first associated with the outer wings of the altar of Saint George in Wismar, and also with fragments of a crucifixion altar from St. Mary's Church in Rostock. However, the wings of the Three Kings altar in St. John's Church, Rostock, are now attributed to a different artist.
