= Heinz Zander =

German author and illustrator (1939–2024)

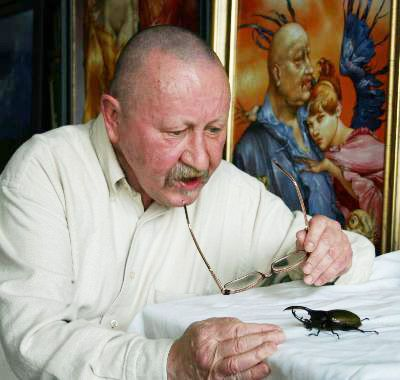
- Born: 2 October 1939; Wolfen, Gau Halle-Merseburg, Germany
- Died: 15 May 2024 (aged 84)
- Education: Hochschule für Grafik und Buchkunst Leipzig
- Known for: Painting; Graphics; Illustrations; Writings

Heinz Zander (2 October 1939 – 15 May 2024) was a German painter, graphic artist, illustrator and writer. Zander belongs to the Leipzig School. His fields of work are painting (oil), drawing, graphics and illustration. Zander was also active as a writer and published novels, stories and essays. He worked with painting techniques oriented towards the Old Masters, from which he developed a completely independent pictorial language. Zander was inspired by Bosch, Grünewald, Altdorfer, Cranach and Italian Mannerists (Pontormo, Bronzino). He worked mainly with colourful resin-oil glazes.

== Studies, early work and middle work (1959–1983) ==
From 1959 to 1964 Heinz Zanders studied at the Hochschule für Grafik und Buchkunst Leipzig (with Bernhard Heisig). Even in his student years, he was regarded as an exceptional talent by both professors and fellow students. Zanders' broad interest in art history led him to experiment with a wide variety of aesthetic approaches. The few works that have survived are not easily identifiable as genuine Zander works, as they masterfully imitate certain styles (such as those of Velázquez). His diploma work on Edgar Allan Poe's The Fall of the House of Usher, which is a sought-after collector's item due to its small edition, has been particularly singled out among colleagues.

During his Meisterschüler studies with the sculptor Fritz Cremer at the Academy of Arts, Berlin, Heinz Zander simultaneously worked designing stage sets. A number of paintings reflect his intimate contacts with the Berlin theatre scene. His intense preoccupation with literature, especially with the works of Bertolt Brecht, Franz Kafka and Thomas Mann, found fruitful expression in numerous graphic illustrations and already displayed Zander's typical style.

After his return to Leipzig (1970), Zander turned to historical material. In the commemorative year of the 450th anniversary of the German Peasants' War (1975), a Peasants' War Museum was set up in the secularised Kornmarktkirche of Mühlhausen, that also was given the epithet "Thomas Müntzer Town". Thus, in connection with the Thomas Müntzer commemorative year, a cycle of paintings of several parts on the Peasants' War were commissioned (exhibited in the Kornmarktkirche, Mühlhausen), as well as a large triptych for the Reformation and Luther commemorative year (exhibited in the Angermuseum, Erfurt). Meanwhile, Werner Tübke, the second grand master of the Leipzig School, was granted one of the largest art projects of the 20th century through the East German government, his monumental 14 m × 123 m Peasants' War Panorama, which Zander had also applied for. However, he was probably considered too cryptic for such an important state commission. Instead, he was awarded, among other things, the commission to create paintings based on Richard Wagner's operas for the Gewandhaus. Unlike other contemporaries, however, Zander always managed to maintain a very strict artistic distance from the political apparatus. Criticism, however, is expressed above all through enigmatisation and a cultivated exaggeration with the help his mannerist pictorial language.

== Pre-Peaceful-Revolution period onwards ==
In the 1980s, he wrote a whole series of novels and short stories parallel to his paintings and graphic works. This cross-genre approach marks the artist's mature work. Paintings before the Peaceful Revolution are characterised on the one hand by the fact that they display an immense number of glazes and complexity, but are often determined by one colour tone (e.g. by being bluish or reddish). The paintings created at the time of the German reunification made subtle comments on contemporary events, which Zander did not engage in by taking direct sides as an active participant, but rather by seismographically recording them as an observer.

The etchings and paintings of the post-reunification period oscillate between melancholic seclusion and an enchanted, burlesque exoticism, and are populated by varying figures from history, contemporary life as well as mythology, such as Diana, Actaeon or Nessus. Often, the pictures contain a wide variety of animals, plants, people and geological structures of rock, mystical-magical landscapes of various climatic zones, stormy ocean waves and elaborate cloud pictures. At other times, however, purely black backgrounds are chosen, which emphasise the presented figures and their wielded objects in all their enigmatic diversity. In most cases, the female figures emanate a dangerously seductive aura, to which the male figures succumb in a grotesque manner. It is not only the pictorial themes that draw on an immense range, but also their painterly and technical realisation. Their selection, however, is not a coincidental product of the respective composition, but usually encodes a wide variety of meanings in deeper, ambiguous symbolism. Delivered with an inimitable sweep and a pronounced rigour of line, reminiscent of the Florentine early Renaissance and Art Nouveau, Heinz Zander's painterly oeuvre alone is estimated at well over a thousand panels.

Zander died on 15 May 2024, at the age of 84.

== Literary works ==
- Stille Landfahrten. Ein märchenhafter Roman und romantische Geschichten. Novel, Hinstorff (publishing house), Rostock 1981
- Das sanfte Labyrinth. Novel, Hinstorff (publishing house), 1984
- Der Höfling im Delta des Mississippi. Märchen, Miniaturen und eine Novelle. Robinson 1984.
- Narrenbegräbnis. Groteske Bilder. Renate Hartleb (editor). Eulenspiegel Verlag (publishing house), Berlin 1986, ISBN 3-359-00035-8.
- Das Max-und-Moritz-Syndrom. Ein burlesker Liebesroman. Hinstorff (publishing house), Rostock 1987
- Puppenspiel mit Moralitäten oder Von der Kunst des Spazierengehens. Hinstorff (publishing house), Rostock 1989
- Colberts Märchen nach der Mode. Ein kleines Erotikon. Hinstorff (publishing house), Rostock 1989, ISBN 3-356-00215-5.

== Zander as illustrator (selection) ==
- Edgar Allan Poe: The Fall of the House of Usher, Diploma thesis at the Hochschule für Grafik und Buchkunst Leipzig, 1964
- Peter Hacks: Zwei Märchen. Philipp Reclam jun. (publishing house), Leipzig 1985
- Ludwig Bechstein: Hexengeschichten. Hinstorff (publishing house), Rostock 1986
- Bertolt Brecht: Die heilige Johanna der Schlachthöfe. Philipp Reclam jun. (publishing house), Leipzig 1968
- Daniel Defoe: Moll Flanders. C.H.Beck (publishing house), 1991, ISBN 9783763240036
- Anonymus: Historia von D. Johann Fausten. Philipp Reclam jun. (publishing house), Leipzig 1979
- Oswald von Wolkenstein: Um dieser Welten Lust. Insel (publishing house), Leipzig 1968
- Bernd Pachnicke (editor): Deutsche Volkslieder für Singstimme und Gitarre. Verlag Neue Musik (publishing house), Berlin 1978

== Art catalogues ==
- Malerei, Zeichnung, Grafik. Museum der bildenden Künste, Leipzig 1984
- Malerei und Zeichnungen. Galerie am Sachsenplatz, Leipzig 1989
- Gemälde Zeichnungen. Städtische Kunstsammlung Freital, 1992
- Hortus conclusus. Panoramamuseum Bad Frankenhausen, 1995
- Zwischen den Inseln. Universität Leipzig, Kustodie 1999
- In verschwiegener Landschaft. Meininger Museen, 2010
- Heinz Zander. Gemälde. Sandsteinverlag, Dresden 2014, ISBN 978-3-95498-137-3
- Wanderungen auf vergessenen Wegen. Panoramamuseum Bad Frankenhausen, 2016
- Arkadische Begebenheiten. galerie thoms, Mühlhausen 2015
- Wanderungen mit Wächtern. galerie thoms, Mühlhausen 2017
