= Ringleben =

Ringleben is the name of two towns in the state of Thuringia, Germany:

- Ringleben, Sömmerda
- Ringleben, Kyffhäuserkreis
