= Volvo LCP2000 =

Volvo LCP
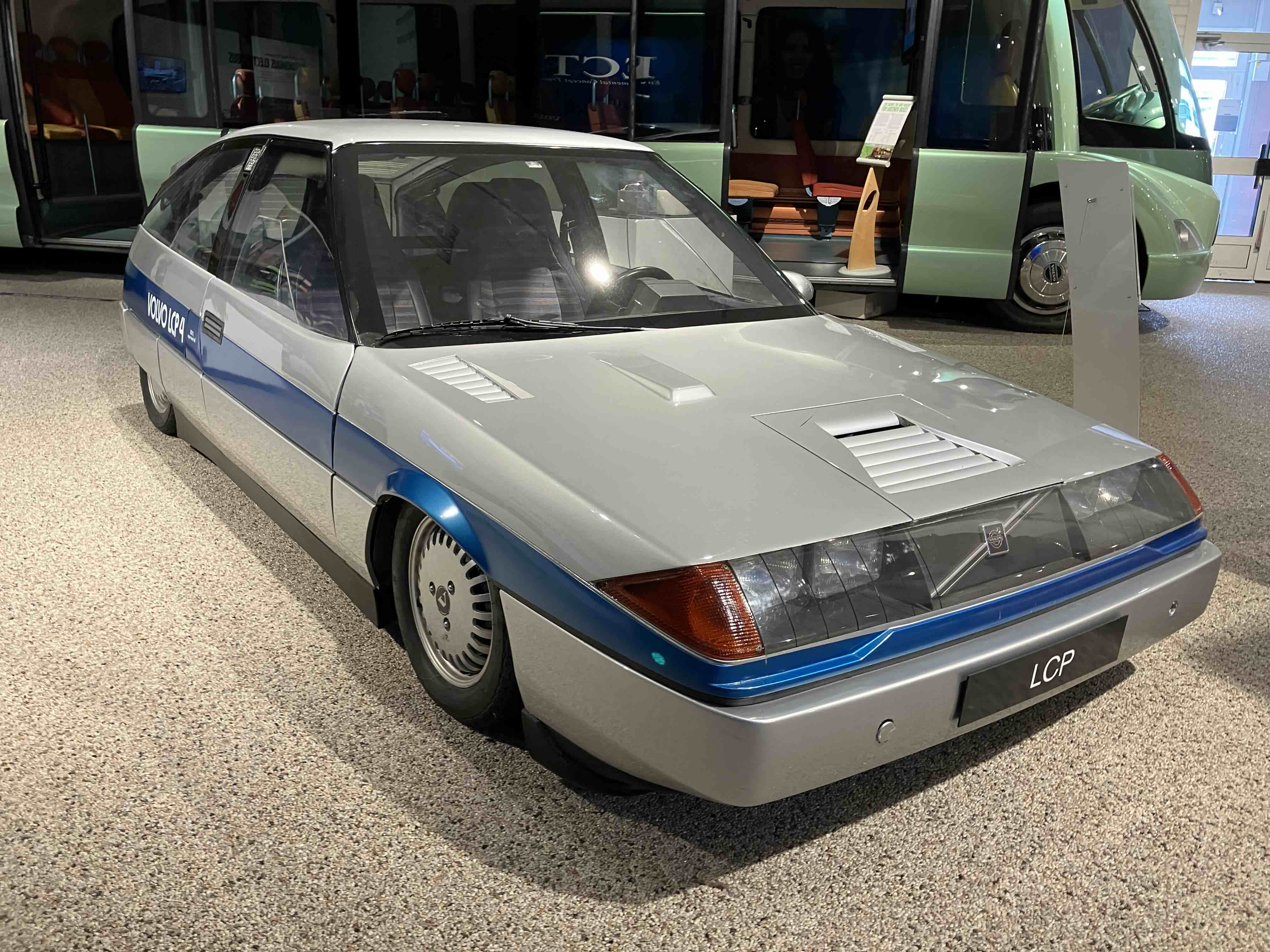
- Volvo LCP2000-4

Overview
- Manufacturer: Volvo
- Production: 1983

Body and chassis
- Class: Concept vehicle
- Body style: 3-door station wagon, hatchback
- Layout: Front-engine, front-wheel-drive

Powertrain
- Engine: 1279 cc Ricardo DI turbodiesel I3; 1387 cc ELKO turbodiesel I3
- Transmission: 5-speed manual; Continuously variable transmission

Dimensions
- Wheelbase: 2,540 mm (100.0 in)
- Length: 3,980 mm (156.7 in)
- Width: 1,650 mm (65.0 in)
- Height: 1,300 mm (51.2 in)
- Kerb weight: 707 kg (1,559 lb)

The Volvo LCP2000 (Light Component Prototype) is a concept car built by Volvo in 1983. It was a project which comprised many engine options for the testing of different fuel types. In this project Volvo experimented with light weight materials to build the engine, such as aluminium, magnesium and plastics.

== Development ==
The engineers started work in 1979; they were given a clean sheet to create a car meant for the year 2000, maximizing low fuel consumption. Especially magnesium was used to a large extent; this was a result of Volvo's aborted Norwegian affair (Norway would take forty per cent of the company in return for cash and ten per cent of one of the North Sea oil fields). Norsk Hydro, one of the world's foremost magnesium producers provided the technical know-how. The wheels were developed in collaboration with Campagnolo. The floor plate was a single plastic casting, to which aluminium and magnesium elements were glued. The steering was by Germany's ZF, while Moulton's Hydragas suspension was also installed.

== Design and specifications ==
Designed to weigh less than 1,500 lb (680 kg), the LCP achieved an EPA 56 mpg city/81 highway and 0-60 mph (97 km/h) in 11 seconds and 110 mph (177 km/h) top speed. It used many components in aluminium, plastic and even a magnesium engine block. Volvo claimed that only 150 kg (331 lb) of "traditional" materials were used. There were two types of three-cylinder turbodiesel engines for this car, one was a magnesium 1.3-liter (1279 cc) powerplant developed together with British diesel specialists Ricardo, pushing 39 kW (53 PS; 52 hp) and weighing 98 kg (216 lb), and a 66 kW (90 PS; 89 hp) cast-iron 1.4-liter Elsbett (ELKO) engine with a KKK turbocharger that could run on a variety of fuels such as low-octane gasoline and sunflower oil (biodiesel). The ELKO engine weighs 130 kg (287 lb). A five-speed manual did not provide quite enough gear ratios, so Volvo also used the CVT technology they had received when they purchased DAF. The car's bodywork was of a modular design, which would help offset the greater cost of the exotic materials used. Drag resistance ranged from drag coefficient of Cd=0.25 to 0.28.
