= Bad Frankenhausen =

- Town
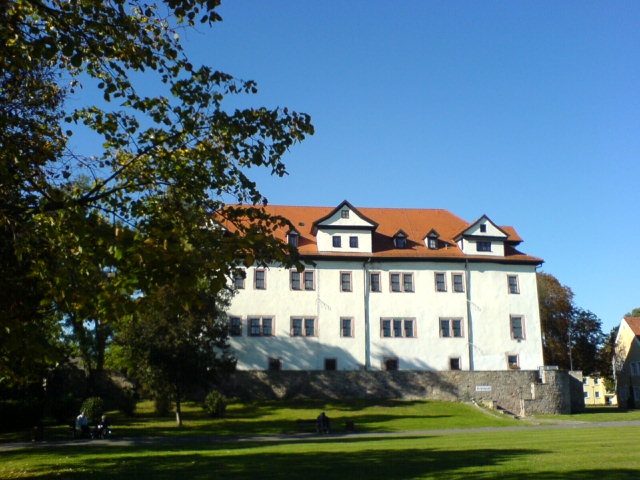
- Frankenhausen Castle

- Coat of arms

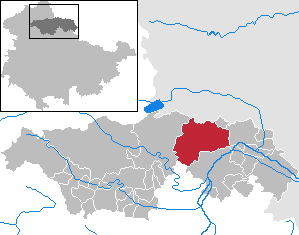
- Location of Bad Frankenhausen within Kyffhäuserkreis district
- Interactive map of Bad Frankenhausen
- Location within Germany Location within Thuringia
- Coordinates: 51°21′21″N 11°6′4″E
- Country: Germany
- State: Thuringia
- District: Kyffhäuserkreis

Government
  - Mayor (2024–30): Matthias Strejc (SPD)

Area
  - Total: 91.06 km^{2} (35.16 sq mi)
- Elevation: 132 m (433 ft)

Population (2025-12-31)
  - Total: 9,715
  - Density: 106.7/km^{2} (276.3/sq mi)
- Time zone: UTC+01:00 (CET)
  - Summer (DST): UTC+02:00 (CEST)
- Postal codes: 06567
- Dialling codes: 034671
- Vehicle registration: KYF
- Website: bad-frankenhausen.de

Bad Frankenhausen (German pronunciation: [baːt ˌfʁaŋkn̩ˈhaʊzn̩]; officially: Bad Frankenhausen/Kyffhäuser) is a spa town in the German state of Thuringia. It is located at the southern slope of the Kyffhäuser mountain range, on an artificial arm of the Wipper river, a tributary of the Unstrut. Because of the nearby Kyffhäuser monument dedicated to Emperor Frederick Barbarossa, it is nicknamed Barbarossastadt. The municipality includes the villages of Seehausen, Udersleben, (since 2007) Esperstedt and (since 2019) Ichstedt and Ringleben.

== History ==
Frankenhausen was first attested as a Frankish settlement in the 9th century in deeds of the Abbey of Fulda. It received town privileges in 1282 and from 1340 on was part of the County of Schwarzburg.

On 15 May 1525 it was the location of the Battle of Frankenhausen, one of the last great battles of the German Peasants' War, when the insurgent peasants under Thomas Müntzer were defeated by troops of the allied Duke George of Saxony, Landgrave Philip I of Hesse and Duke Henry V of Brunswick-Lüneburg. Müntzer was captured, tortured and finally beheaded at Mühlhausen on 27 May.

With the partition of Schwarzburg County in 1599, Frankenhausen became the capital of the Unterherrschaft subdivision of the County of Schwarzburg-Rudolstadt, which in 1710 was raised to a principality. Prince Günther Victor was the last German monarch to abdicate, on 23 November (as Prince of Schwarzburg-Rudolstadt) and 25 November 1918 (as Prince of Schwarzburg-Sondershausen). The succeeding short-lived Free State of Schwarzburg-Rudolstadt merged into the newly created Thuringia in 1920.

Since 1818 a saline water well that had been used for centuries to extract salt has been used for saline baths and medical purposes. Therefore, in 1927 Frankenhausen received the official title of a spa town (Bad). In the 19th century the town was also famous for the manufacture of pearl buttons. Today it mainly depends on tourism and spa vacation.

Since 1972 Frankenhausen has been a garrison town, formerly of a motorised infantry regiment of the National People's Army, from 1990 on of the 13th Mechanized Infantry Division of the German Army.

=== Population since 1994 ===
Population as of 31 December unless otherwise noted:

- 1994: 9730
- 1995: 9834
- 1996: 9768
- 1997: 9661
- 1998: 9542
- 1999: 9472
- 2000: 9432
- 2001: 9233
- 2002: 9132
- 2003: 8978
- 2004: 8809
- 2005: 8775
- 2006: 8706
- 2007: 9292
- 2008: 9097
- 2009: 9000
- 2010: 8962
- 2011: 8677
- 2012: 8677
- 2013: 8672
- 2014: 8734
- 2015: 8792

== Peasants' War Panorama ==
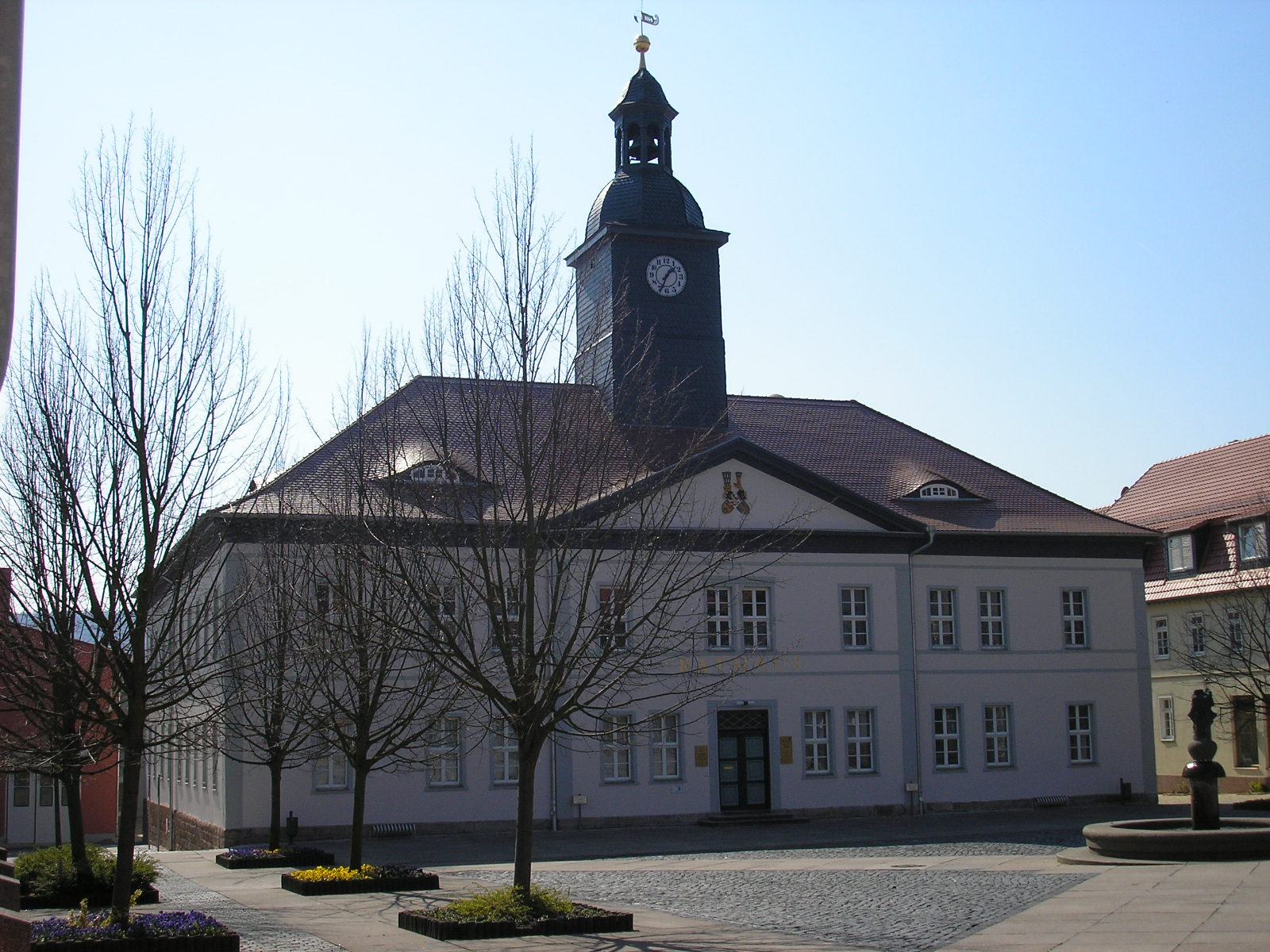
Frankenhausen Town hall

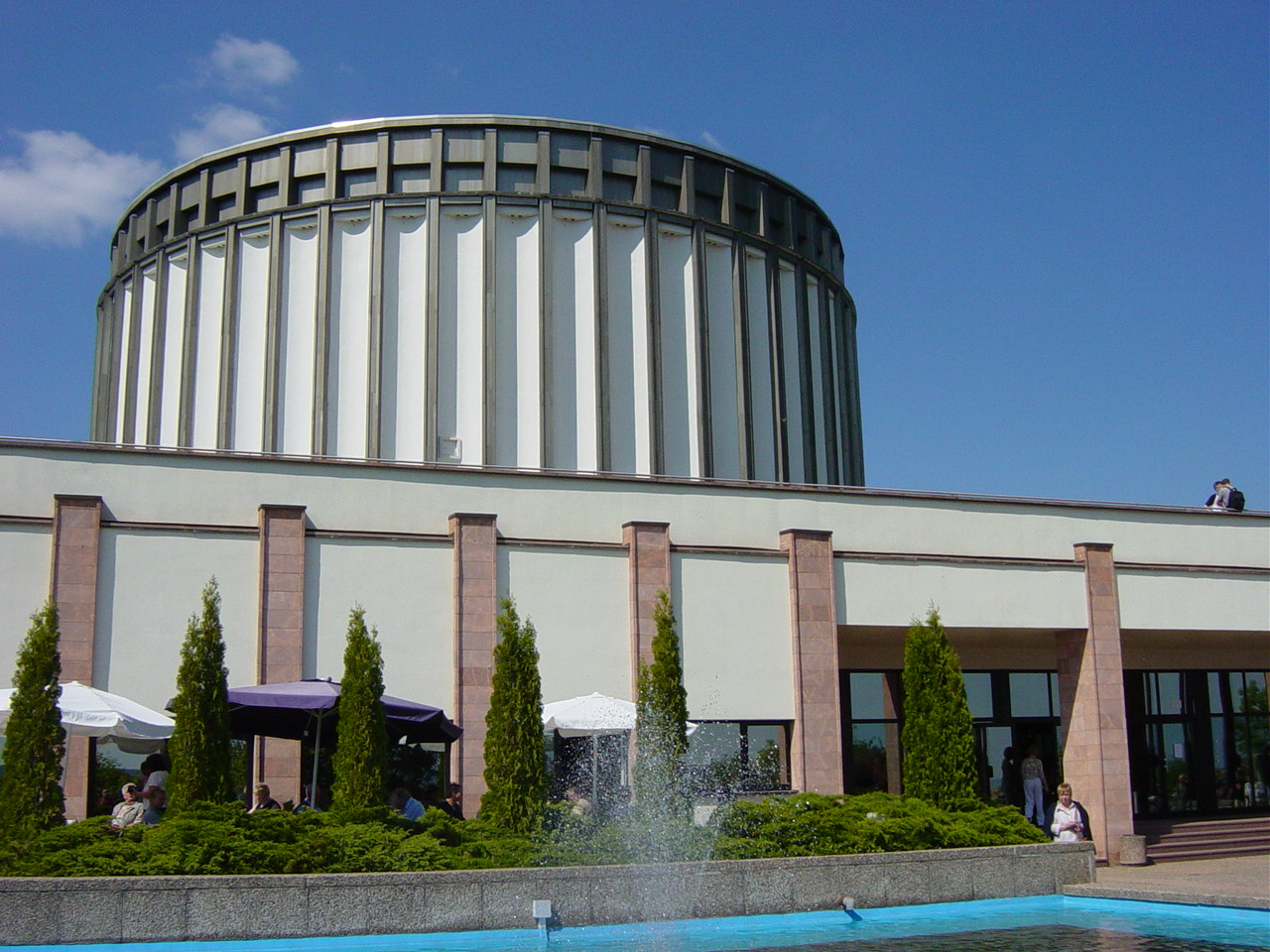
Panorama Museum, rotunda

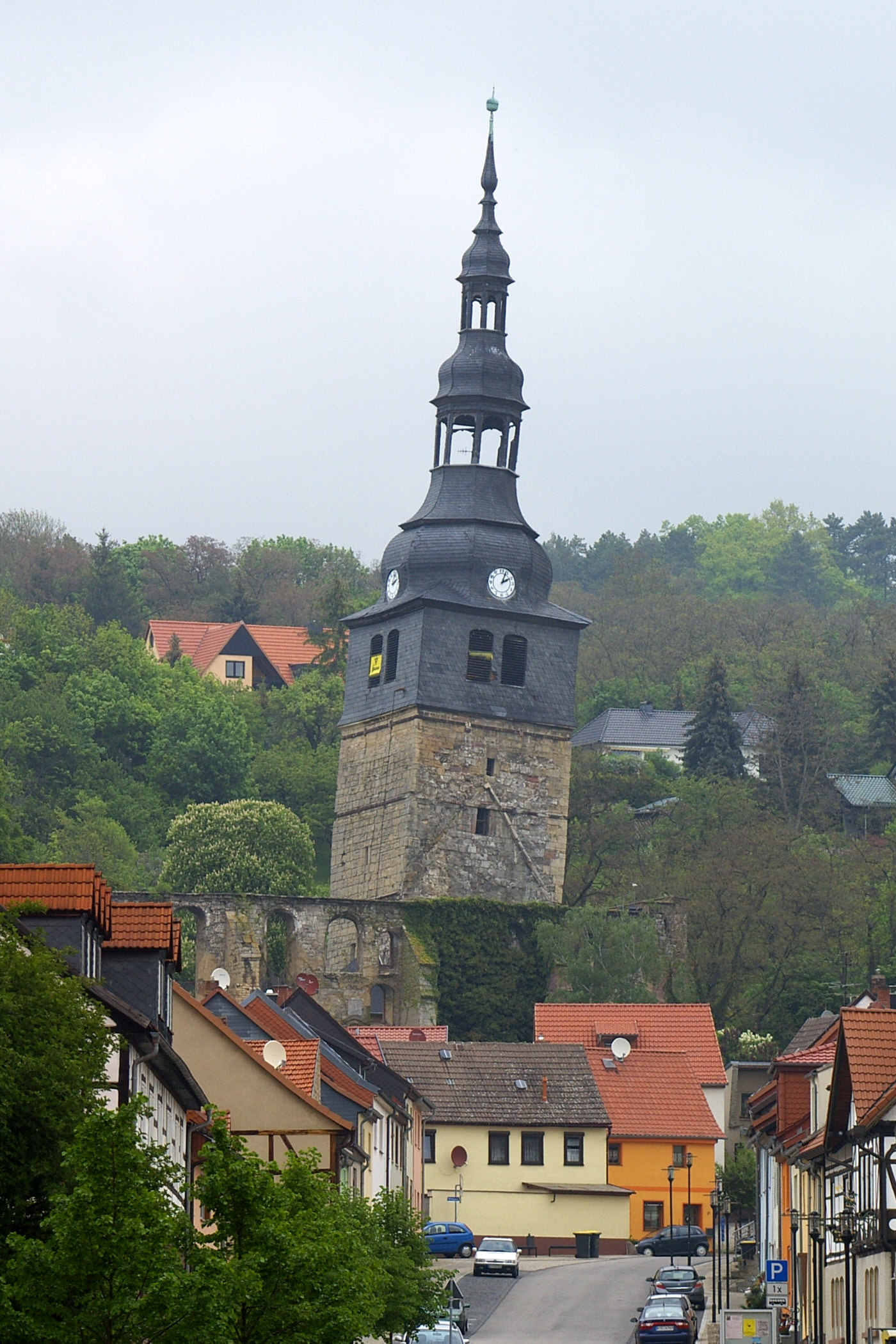
The tower of Bad Frankenhausen's Oberkirche is claimed to be the second most crooked tower in Germany.

Based on Friedrich Engels' 1850 book The Peasant War in Germany, Thomas Müntzer as an early revolutionary became an icon of historical materialism in East Germany.
At the 450-years jubilee of the battle for Frankenhaus in 1975, the then-ruling Socialist Unity Party of Germany (SED) charged the rector of the Leipzig Academy of Visual Arts, Professor Werner Tübke, with the creation of a monumental panorama painting: Early Bourgeois Revolution in Germany, also known as the Peasants' War Panorama. The work in a specially erected rotunda was finished in 1987. Depicting more than 3000 individuals, the panorama is 123 metres (404 ft) in length and 14 metres (46 ft) in height.
Despite the Politburo's plans modelled on the Battle of Borodino panorama at Poklonnaya Hill in Moscow, Tübke realised a rather pessimistic vision of a resigned Müntzer standing alone among battling troops, a Bundschuh flag on the ground at his side. The Panorama was inaugurated by Kurt Hager and Margot Honecker, as deputy for her husband Erich, on 14 September 1989, eight weeks before the fall of the Berlin Wall and the eventual reunification of Germany in October 1990.

Today the Panorama Museum displays art shows and a collection of works of contemporary international artists.

== Sights ==
- Frankenhausen Castle, with medieval foundations from the 14th century on, served as a residence of the House of Schwarzburg. Heavily damaged during the Peasants' War, it was rebuilt in Renaissance style between 1533 and 1536. Today it houses a museum of local history.
- The Church of Our Lady at the Mountain, colloquially called Oberkirche (Upper Church), completed in 1382, is known for its spire which precariously inclines to the side. The imbalance caused by sinkholes of the nearby salt mines had already started to affect it in the 17th century, for the Baroque top partly equalises the slant of the tower. When last measured, it leant at 4.8°, increasing 6 cm (2.4 in) per year, and thus is the second most leaning tower of Germany (after the spire of the Suurhusen Church) and leaning to a greater extent than the Tower of Pisa. In 2014, the German federal government agreed to pay €950,000 for work to stabilise the lean of the tower, fitting a "steel corset", thereby saving the structure from the risk of demolition.
- The Kyffhäuser mountain range north of the town is the site of the Kyffhäuser Monument, a huge sculpture in celebration of German national unity built from 1890 to 1896 to plans by Bruno Schmitz on the ruins of a former Kaiserpfalz.

== Notable people ==
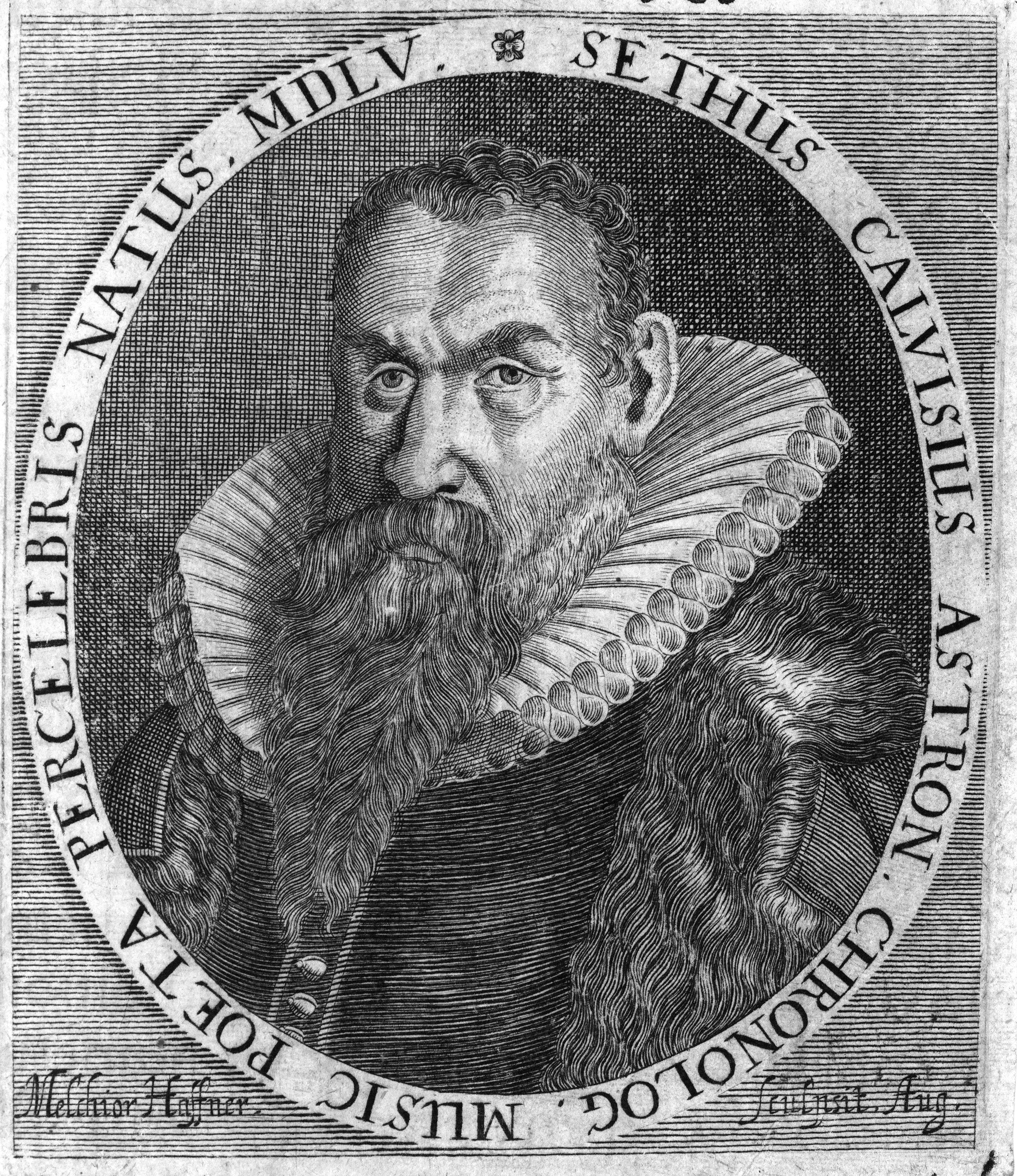
Sethus Calvisius

- Rudolf Aderhold (1865–1907), mycologist, botanist, director of the Imperial Institute of Agriculture and Forestry in Berlin-Dahlem
- Sethus Calvisius (1556–1615), composer, grew up in Frankenhausen
- Dapayk (born 1978), producer and label owner
- Georg Eberhardt (1914–1943), Sturmbannführer (Major) of the Waffen SS during World War II
- Ludwig Elsbett (1913–2003), inventor of the Elsbett Engine, studied engineering in Bad Frankenhausen
- Robert H. Foerderer (1860-1903), U.S. Congressman
- Reimund Neugebauer (born 1953), engineer and university teacher
- Eva Padberg (born 1980), fashion model, born 27 January 1980 in Bad Frankenhausen.
- Dieter Rex (1936–2002), painter and designer
- Doris Schade (1924–2012), actress, born in Frankenhausen
- Tom Schilling (choreographer) (born 1928 in Esperstedt), choreographer of modern dance theater
- Selmar Schonland (1860–1940), botanist and a founder of Rhodes University, born in Bad Frankenhausen
- Nils Schumann (born 1978), track and field athlete and Olympic 800 m champion
- Harald Vollmar (born 1947), marksman and multiple Olympic medalist
- Martin Gottfried Weiss (1905–1946), war criminal, commander of the Dachau concentration camp, studied electrical engineering in Bad Frankenhausen
- Franz Winter (politician, born 1860) (1860–1920), the first social democratic president of a German parliament
- Christa Wolf (1929–2011), novelist, finished school in Bad Frankenhausen
- Gerhard Wolf (writer) (born 1928), writer and publisher

== Twin town ==
- Bad Sooden-Allendorf, Werra-Meißner-Kreis, Hesse, Germany since 1990.

== Literature ==
- Deutscher Städteatlas; Band: IV; 2 Teilband. Acta Collegii Historiae Urbanae Societatis Historicorum Internationalis - Serie C. Im Auftrag des Kuratoriums für vergleichende Städtegeschichte e. V. und mit Unterstützung der Deutschen Forschungsgemeinschaft, hrsg. von Heinz Stoob, Wilfried Ehbrecht, Jürgen Lafrenz und Peter Johannek. Stadtmappe Bad Frankenhausen, Author: Heinz Stoob. ISBN 3-89115-032-6; Dortmund-Altenbeken, 1989.
