= Ichstedt =

- Ortsteil of Bad Frankenhausen
- Interactive map of Ichstedt
- Location within Germany Location within Thuringia
- Coordinates: 51°23′5″N 11°12′5″E
- Country: Germany
- State: Thuringia
- District: Kyffhäuserkreis
- Town: Bad Frankenhausen

Area
  - Total: 9.7 km^{2} (3.7 sq mi)
- Elevation: 145 m (476 ft)

Population (2022)
  - Total: 520
  - Density: 54/km^{2} (140/sq mi)
- Time zone: UTC+01:00 (CET)
  - Summer (DST): UTC+02:00 (CEST)
- Postal codes: 06556
- Dialling codes: 0 34 66
- Vehicle registration: KYF

Ichstedt (German pronunciation: [ˈɪçʃtɛt]) is a village and a former municipality in the district Kyffhäuserkreis, in Thuringia, Germany. On 1 January 2019, it became part of the town of Bad Frankenhausen. The village was mentioned in a charter of Louis the German in 874 for the first time. The village was once a moated castle, which was located on the site of the later manor. By 1918, the town belonged to the principality of Schwarzburg-Rudolstadt.
