= Oberkirche, Bad Frankenhausen =

Oberkirche
- Kirche Unserer Lieben Frauen am Berge
- Bergkirche
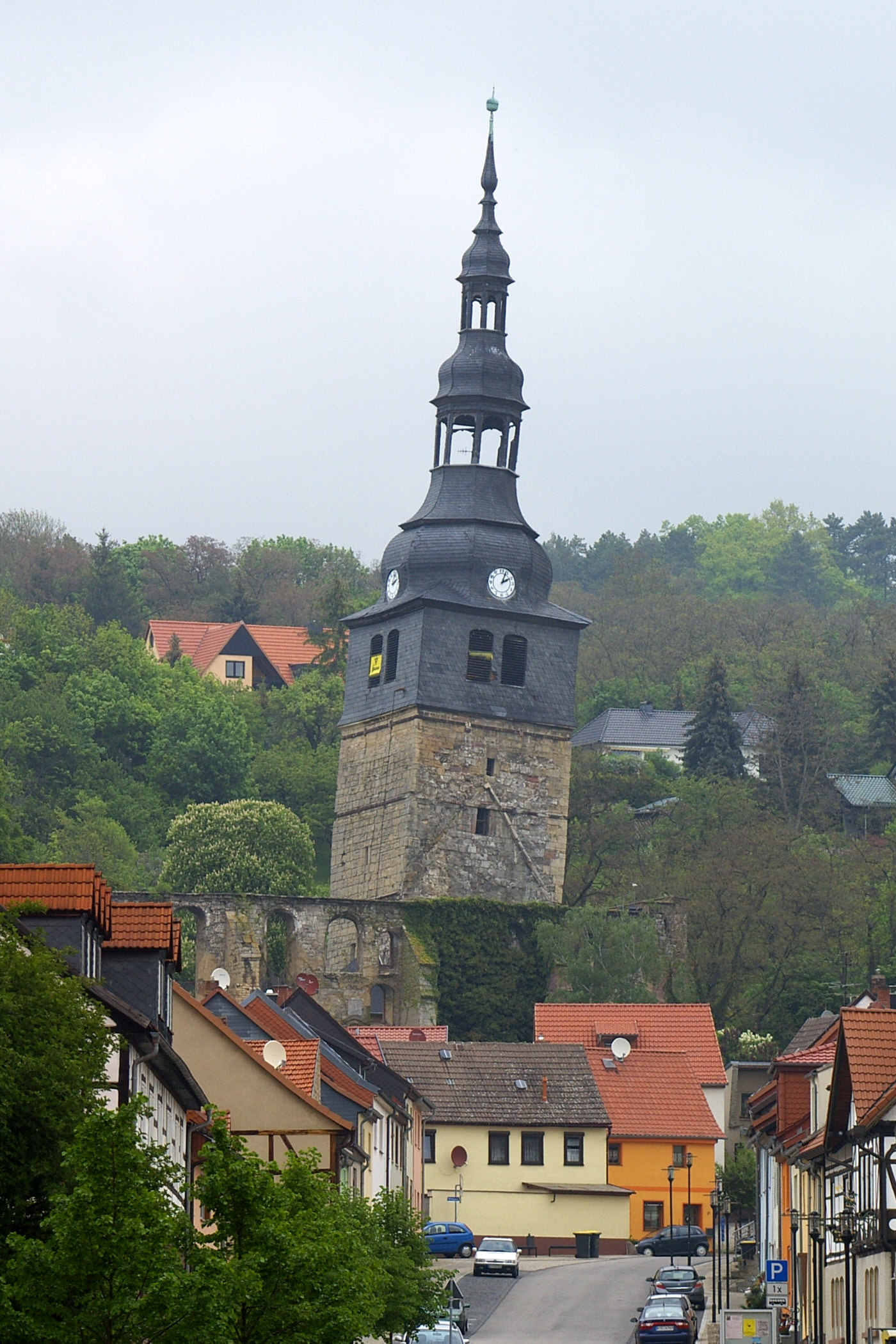
- View from south (2010)

- 51°21′34″N 11°06′20″E
- Location: Bad Frankenhausen, Kyffhäuserkreis, Thuringia
- Country: Germany
- Denomination: Lutheran
- Previous denomination: Roman Catholic

Architecture
- Functional status: Ruin
- Style: Gothic
- Completed: 25 April 1382

Administration
- District: Kirchenkreis Bad Frankenhausen-Sondershausen
- Province: Protestant Church in Central Germany

The Oberkirche (pronounced [ˈoːbɐˌkɪʁçə], "Upper Church"), also Kirche Unserer Lieben Frauen am Berge ("Church of Our Lady by the mountain") or Bergkirche ("Mountain Church"), in Bad Frankenhausen, Thuringia, Germany, is a Gothic church building. Its 56-metre-high (184 ft) leaning tower has the largest overhang of all German towers at 4.6 m (15 ft) to north-east and is a landmark of the town.

== Tower ==
Due to gypsum and salt leaching in the lower-lying soil, the top of the approximately 56-metre-high (184 ft) church tower, which has a Baroque dome with two lanterns, was tilted 4.60 m (15 ft 1 in) from the vertical (equivalent to 4.93°) in 2013. This makes the tower one of the most crooked towers in Germany. Measured by the overhang (deviation of the top of the tower from the perpendicular), it has the highest value of all German towers. It is more inclined than the Leaning Tower of Pisa which had an inclination of 3.97° in 2011.
