= Elizabeth von Hauff =

Canadian physicist

Elizabeth von Hauff (born 1977 in Toronto) is a Canadian physicist. Since 2021, she has been the director of the Fraunhofer Institute for Electron Beam and Plasma Technology in Dresden, and a professor at TU Dresden.

== Biography ==
Elizabeth von Hauff was born in Toronto, Canada, and studied physics at the University of Alberta, obtaining a BSc with honors in 2000. She started the Masters program in renewable energy at Universität Oldenburg in 2001, and completed her doctorate in semiconductor physics at the same university with a thesis entitled “Field effect investigations of charge carrier transport in organic semiconductors” in 2005. She continued working there worked there as a postdoc, and completed her habilitation in experimental physics in 2011.

Von Hauff next worked at the Fraunhofer Institute for Solar Energy Systems ISE, and became associate professor of organic photovoltaics in the faculty of physics of the University of Freiburg. She was appointed an associate professor of physics at the Vrije Universiteit Amsterdam in 2013. In 2021, she also became associate professor of mon-equilibrium thermodynamics in energy conversion at the University of Amsterdam.

In 2021, she was appointed the director of the Fraunhofer Institute for Electron Beam and Plasma Technology in Dresden, with a secondary appointment as the Chair of Coating Technologies for Electronics at TU Dresden. In addition to these positions, she remains a visiting professor at the Vrije Universiteit Amsterdam.

== Research ==
Her research focuses on innovative technologies for electronics, energy technology and sensor technology. She focuses on fundamental questions at the interface between physics, chemistry and biology in relation to applications in photovoltaics, biosensor technology and wearables. In the field of solar energy generation, she studies the role of dynamic processes at the functional interfaces of energy conversion. She works with surface treatment processes and uses operando characterization of layers and interfaces.
