= Ludwig Elsbett =

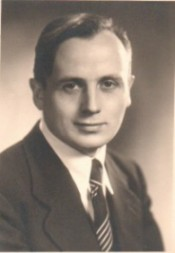
- Born: 8 November 1913; Salz, Lower Franconia, Germany
- Died: 28 March 2003 (aged 89); Salz, Lower Franconia, Germany
- Occupations: Engineer and designer of Diesel Engine.
- Title: Dr. hc. Ludwig Elsbett / company founder
- Spouse: Lieselotte Elsbett
- Children: Günter (1941), Heidi (1943), Linde (1944), Max (1945), Klaus (1949)
- Parent(s): Victor & Maria Elsbett
- Website: http://www.elsbett-museum.de/ludwig/ludwig.html

Ludwig Elsbett was the inventor of the Elsbett engine.

Elsbett was one of nine children of the farmer Viktor Elsbett and his wife Maria. He grew up in agriculture and was originally trained as a fitter for agricultural machinery. Later, he attended technical schools in Bad Frankenhausen and Neustrelitz to study mechanical engineering and aircraft engines.

In 1937, he was appointed department manager at the Junkers Aircraft Works in Dessau and developed combustion engines. In 1940, he married his wife Lieselotte and had five children with her. He was a living legend of technology; he played a decisive role in the further development of diesel engine technology.

After the war, Elsbett set up an independent factory in Salzgitter for the production of a small two-stroke diesel engine.

In 1973, Elsbett gained international recognition for the first ever serial-produced direct-injection diesel engine for cars.

In 1977, Elsbett produced an engine fueled by vegetable oil called the Elsbett-motor.

In 1980, Elsbett made the first conversion of standard diesel cars with prechamber engines to vegetable oil.

In 1993, the Elsbett Mercedes won the first Eco Tour of Europe with the lowest consumption of fuel.

In 1997, Elsbett won the European Solar Prize.

In 2002, Elsbett converted the standard common-rail car engine and unit-injector truck engine to run on bio-diesel.

There is a Elsbett Museum in the city of Salz, Bavaria, Lower Franconia.

== See also ==
- Elsbett Engine
- Fuel injection
