= Fraunhofer-Gesellschaft =

Research organization

- Fraunhofer Society for the Advancement of Applied Research
- German: Fraunhofer-Gesellschaft zur Förderung der angewandten Forschung e. V.

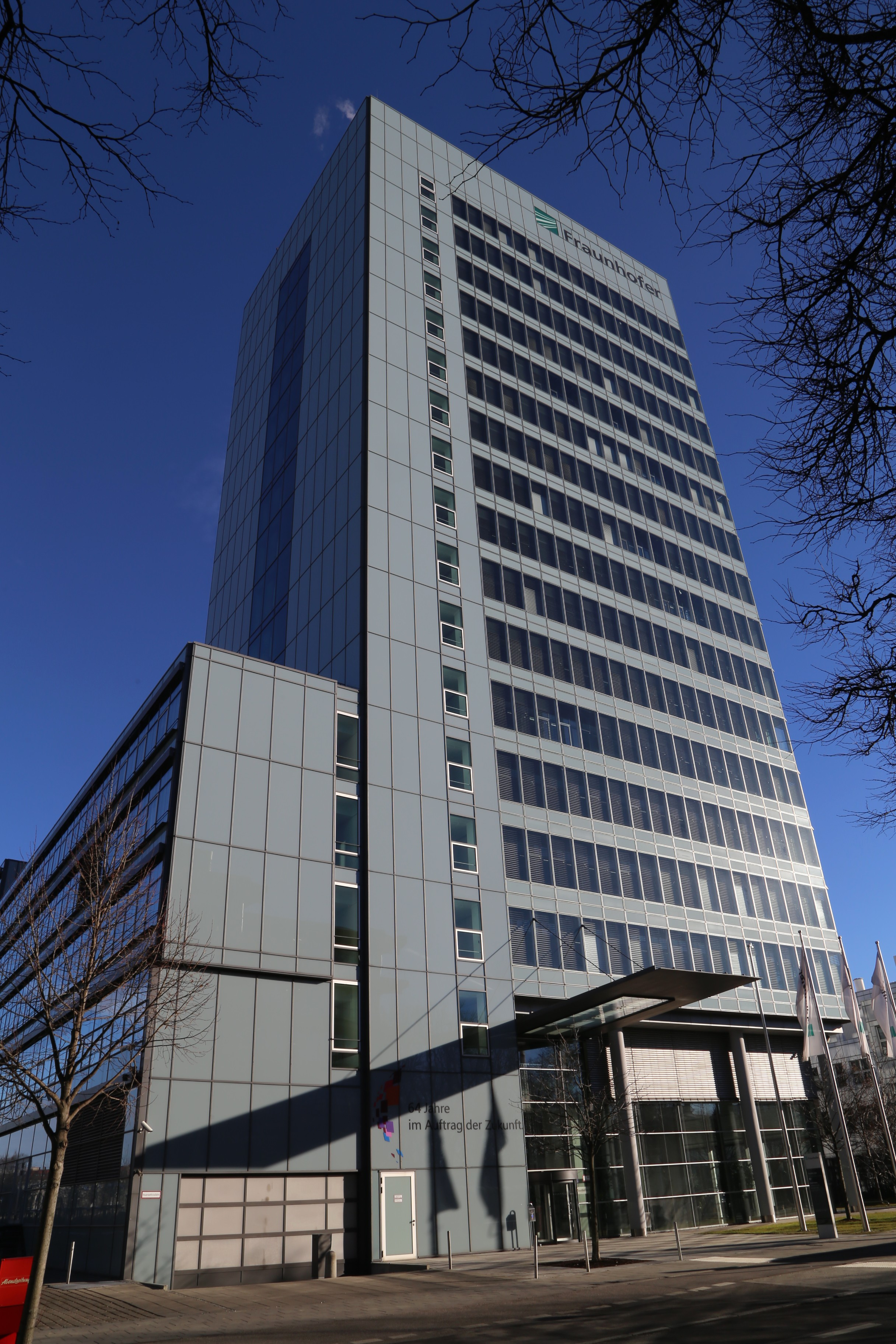
- Headquarters in Munich, in 2013
- Named after: Joseph von Fraunhofer
- Formation: 26 March 1949 (77 years ago)
- Type: Nonprofit
- Headquarters: 17 Stockwerke, Hansastraße, Munich, Germany
- Location(s): Multiple sites in Germany, U.S., and U.K.
- Services: Research institute
- Methods: Applied research and development; patent development
- Fields: Microelectronics; information and communications technology; life sciences; materials science; energy technology; medical technology; social sciences; anor.
- Official language: German
- President: Holger Hanselka (since 2023– )
- Subsidiaries: multiple
- Budget: €3.6 billion (2024)
- Staff: 32,000 (2024)
- Website: fraunhofer.de (in German)

The Fraunhofer-Gesellschaft, (Note: Full name, in German: Fraunhofer-Gesellschaft zur Förderung der angewandten Forschung e. V., lit. 'Fraunhofer Society for the Advancement of Applied Research'.) commonly known in English as the Fraunhofer Society, is a German organization dedicated to applied research. It includes 74 institutes and research units, each focusing on different research fields. With some 32,000 employees, mainly scientists and engineers, and an annual research budget of approximately €3.6 billion, it is one of the world's leading organizations for applied research. The organization, headquartered in Munich, is named after Joseph von Fraunhofer, who, as a scientist, engineer and entrepreneur, is said to have superbly exemplified the goals of Fraunhofer. Since the 1990s the organization has also internationalized, establishing various centers and representative offices in Europe, the United States, Asia and South America.

== Fraunhofer model ==
Under the Fraunhofer model, which was approved in 1973, the Fraunhofer-Gesellschaft earns about two thirds of its income through contracts with industry or specific government projects. The remaining third of the budget is sourced in the proportion 9:1 from federal and state government grants and is used to support pre-competitive research.

Thus the size of Fraunhofer's budget depends largely on its success in maximizing revenue from contract research.

The institutes are not legally independent units. However, the Fraunhofer model grants a very high degree of independence to the institutes in terms of project results and scientific impact and above all for their own funding. On the one hand, this results in a high degree of independence in terms of technical focus, distribution of resources, project acquisition and project management. On the other hand, this also generates a certain economic pressure and a compulsion to customer and market orientation. In this sense, the institutes and their employees act in an entrepreneurial manner and ideally combine research, innovation and entrepreneurship.

Numerous innovations are the result of research and development work at the Fraunhofer institutes. The institutes work on practically all application-relevant technology fields, including microelectronics, information and communications technology, life sciences, materials science, energy technology or medical technology. One of the best known Fraunhofer developments is the MP3 audio data compression process. In 2024, the Fraunhofer-Gesellschaft reported 507 new inventions. Of these, 439 patent applications claiming rights of priority were filed. The number of active patent families amounted to 7,081. Studies in 2023 have shown that the presence of a Fraunhofer center can boost the patent output of local firms and inventors by at least 13%.

== Institutes ==
As of 2025, the Fraunhofer-Gesellschaft operated 75 institutes and research units throughout Germany:

- Fraunhofer Institute for Additive Production Technologies IAPT
- Fraunhofer Institute for Algorithms and Scientific Computing SCAI
- Fraunhofer Institute for Applied Information Technology FIT
- Fraunhofer Institute for Applied and Integrated Security AISEC
- Fraunhofer Institute for Applied Optics and Precision Engineering (IOF)
- Fraunhofer Institute for Applied Polymer Research IAP
- Fraunhofer Institute for Applied Solid State Physics IAF
- Fraunhofer Research Fab Battery Cells FFB
- Fraunhofer Institute for Biomedical Engineering IBMT
- Fraunhofer Institute for Building Physics IBP
- Fraunhofer Institute for Casting, Composite and Processing Technology IGCV
- Fraunhofer Institute for Cell Therapy and Immunology IZI
- Fraunhofer Institute for Ceramic Technologies and Systems IKTS
- Fraunhofer Institute for Chemical Technology ICT
- Fraunhofer Institute for Communication, Information Processing and Ergonomics FKIE
- Fraunhofer Institute for Computer Graphics Research IGD
- Fraunhofer Institute for Digital Media Technology IDMT
- Fraunhofer Institute for Digital Medicine MEVIS
- Fraunhofer Institute for Electron Beam and Plasma Technology (FEP)
- Fraunhofer Institute for Electronic Nano Systems ENAS
- Fraunhofer Institute for Energy Economics and Energy System Technology IEE
- Fraunhofer Research Institution for Energy Infrastructures and Geothermal Systems IEG
- Fraunhofer Institute for Environmental, Safety and Energy Technology UMSICHT
- Fraunhofer Institute for Cognitive Systems IKS
- Fraunhofer Institute for Experimental Software Engineering IESE
- Fraunhofer Institute for Factory Operation and Automation IFF
- Fraunhofer Institute for High Frequency Physics and Radar Techniques FHR
- Fraunhofer Institute for High-Speed Dynamics, Ernst-Mach-Institut (EMI)
- Fraunhofer Research Institution for Individualized and Cell-Based Medical Engineering IMTE
- Fraunhofer Institute for Industrial Engineering IAO
- Fraunhofer Institute for Industrial Mathematics ITWM
- Fraunhofer Information Center for Planning and Building IRB
- Fraunhofer Institute for Integrated Circuits IIS
- Fraunhofer Institute for Integrated Systems and Device Technology IISB
- Fraunhofer Institute for Intelligent Analysis and Information Systems (IAIS)
- Fraunhofer Institute for Interfacial Engineering and Biotechnology IGB
- Fraunhofer Institute for Large Structures in Production Engineering IGP
- Fraunhofer Institute for Laser Technology ILT
- Fraunhofer Institute for Machine Tools and Forming Technology IWU
- Fraunhofer Institute for Manufacturing Technology and Advanced Materials IFAM
- Fraunhofer Institute for Manufacturing Engineering and Automation IPA
- Fraunhofer Institute for Material and Beam Technology IWS
- Fraunhofer Institute for Material Flow and Logistics IML
- Fraunhofer Research Institution for Materials Recycling and Resource Strategies IWKS
- Fraunhofer Institute for Mechanics of Materials (IWM)
- Fraunhofer Institute for Mechatronic Systems Design IEM
- Fraunhofer Institute for Microelectronic Circuits and Systems IMS
- Fraunhofer Institute for Microengineering and Microsystems IMM
- Fraunhofer Institute for Microstructure of Materials and Systems IMWS
- Fraunhofer Research Institution for Microsystems and Solid State Technologies EMFT
- Fraunhofer Institute for Molecular Biology and Applied Ecology IME
- Fraunhofer Institute for Nondestructive Testing IZFP
- Fraunhofer Institute for Optronics, System Technologies and Image Exploitation IOSB
- Fraunhofer Institute for Open Communication Systems (FOKUS)
- Fraunhofer Institute for Photonic Microsystems IPMS
- Fraunhofer Institute for Physical Measurement Techniques IPM
- Fraunhofer Institute for Process Engineering and Packaging IVV
- Fraunhofer Institute for Production Systems and Design Technology IPK
- Fraunhofer Institute for Production Technology IPT
- Fraunhofer Institute for Reliability and Microintegration IZM
- Fraunhofer Institute for Secure Information Technology SIT
- Fraunhofer Institute for Silicate Research ISC
- Fraunhofer Institute for Silicon Technology ISIT
- Fraunhofer Institute for Software and Systems Engineering ISST
- Fraunhofer Institute for Solar Energy Systems ISE
- Fraunhofer Institute for Structural Durability and System Reliability LBF
- Fraunhofer Institute for Surface Engineering and Thin Films IST
- Fraunhofer Institute for Systems and Innovation Research (ISI)
- Fraunhofer Institute for Technological Trend Analysis INT
- Fraunhofer Institute for Telecommunications, Heinrich Hertz Institut, (HHI)
- Fraunhofer Institute for Toxicology and Experimental Medicine ITEM
- Fraunhofer Institute for Translational Medicine and Pharmacology ITMP
- Fraunhofer Institute for Transportation and Infrastructure Systems IVI
- Fraunhofer Institute for Wind Energy Systems IWES
- Fraunhofer Institute for Wood Research Wilhelm-Klauditz-Institut WKI

=== Fraunhofer USA ===
In addition to its German institutes and research units, the Fraunhofer-Gesellschaft operates three US-based centers through its American subsidiary, Fraunhofer USA, in collaboration with major research universities:

- Fraunhofer USA Center Midwest (CMW) in Michigan
- Fraunhofer USA Center Mid-Atlantic (CMA) in Maryland
- Fraunhofer USA Center for Manufacturing Innovation (CMI) in Massachusetts

Fraunhofer USA also operates a headquarters office in Plymouth, Michigan, and a Digital Media Technologies (DMT) office in San Jose, California. Furthermore, Fraunhofer USA participates in the South Carolina Fraunhofer USA Alliance, in collaboration with the South Carolina Council on Competitiveness and the South Carolina Department of Commerce.

=== Fraunhofer UK Research Ltd ===
At the invitation of the UK government, Fraunhofer UK Research Ltd was established in partnership with the University of Strathclyde. The UK's first Fraunhofer center, the Fraunhofer Centre for Applied Photonics, was established and quickly recognized as a world-leading center in lasers and optical systems. The UK government commented on the significance of Fraunhofer CAP in quantum technology innovation. Ongoing core funding is received from the Scottish government and from Scottish Enterprise.

=== Fraunhofer Institute for Intelligent Analysis and Information Systems ===
The Fraunhofer Institute for Intelligent Analysis and Information Systems (German: Fraunhofer-Institut für Intelligente Analyse- und Informationssysteme), abbreviated as Fraunhofer IAIS, or simply IAIS, is a research and development institute of the society located in Sankt Augustin, Germany. It focuses on artificial intelligence, machine learning and big data, for which it offers a broad range of services across various industries. Fraunhofer IAIS was created in July 2006 through the aggregation of the Fraunhofer Institute for Media Communications and the Institute for Autonomous Intelligent Systems (AIS) of the Society for Mathematics and Data Processing GmbH (GMD) after the GMD had been integrated into the Fraunhofer Society in 2001.

As of 2026, Fraunhofer IAIS performs research on generative AI (AI-based curation and synthesis of high-quality training data, improved reasoning skills, knowledge distillation, domain-specific adaptation, multi-agent systems and multimodality), agentic AI (specialized reasoning, edge AI agents and sovereign AI agent system, reliable agent evaluation, enterprise MLOps, and extended agent capabilities) and hybrid AI, i.e., the combination of different methods of AI. In its research, Fraunhofer IAIS cooperates with other Fraunhofer organizations (e.g., the Fraunhofer Big Data and AI Alliance, the Fraunhofer Competence Network on Quantum Computing, Fraunhofer CCIT or Fraunhofer HNFIZ) and the universities of Bonn and Siegen, leads the regional AI competence platform KI.NRW, and supports the Lamarr Institute for Machine Learning and Artificial Intelligence. Key research projects include:

- OpenGPT-X: development of the European multilingual language model Teuken 7B
- OpenEuroLLM: development of an open-source multilingual language model
- DeployAI: development of a technology platform for small and medium-sized businesses and the public sector in Europe
- Jupiter AI Factory: supercomputer-based development of secure and data protection-compliant AI applications
- TrustLLM: development of an open, trustworthy and fact-based large language model for Germanic languages

== Notable projects ==
- The MP3 compression algorithm, which was invented and patented by the Fraunhofer Institute for Integrated Circuits IIS. Its license revenues generated about 100 million euros in revenue for Fraunhofer in 2005.
- The H.264/MPEG-4 AVC video compression standard, to which the Fraunhofer Institute for Telecommunications, Heinrich Hertz Institute, HHI was a significant contributor. The technology was recognized with two Emmy awards in 2008 and 2009. This includes the Fraunhofer FDK AAC library.
- A metamorphic triple-junction solar cell developed by the Fraunhofer Institute for Solar Energy Systems ISE. As of May 2010, it holds the world record for solar energy conversion efficiency with 41.1%, nearly twice that of a standard silicon-based cell.
- E-puzzler, a pattern-recognition machine to digitally put back together even the most finely shredded papers. It uses a computerized conveyor belt that runs shards of shredded and torn paper through a digital scanner, automatically reconstructing original documents. It was hoped in 2013 that the machine would be able to reconstruct 16,000 bags of torn-up documents, but by 2014 only 23 bags had been reconstructed and the project stalled. In 2024 faster technology was being sought to prepare the vast number of fragments for scanning.
- OpenIMS, an open source implementation of IMS Call Session Control Functions (CSCFs) and a lightweight Home Subscriber Server (HSS), which together form the core elements of all IMS/NGN architectures as specified today within 3GPP, 3GPP2, ETSI TISPAN and the PacketCable initiative.
- Roborder, an autonomous border surveillance system that uses uncrewed mobile robots including aerial, water surface, underwater and ground vehicles that incorporate multi-modal sensors as part of an interoperable network.

== History ==
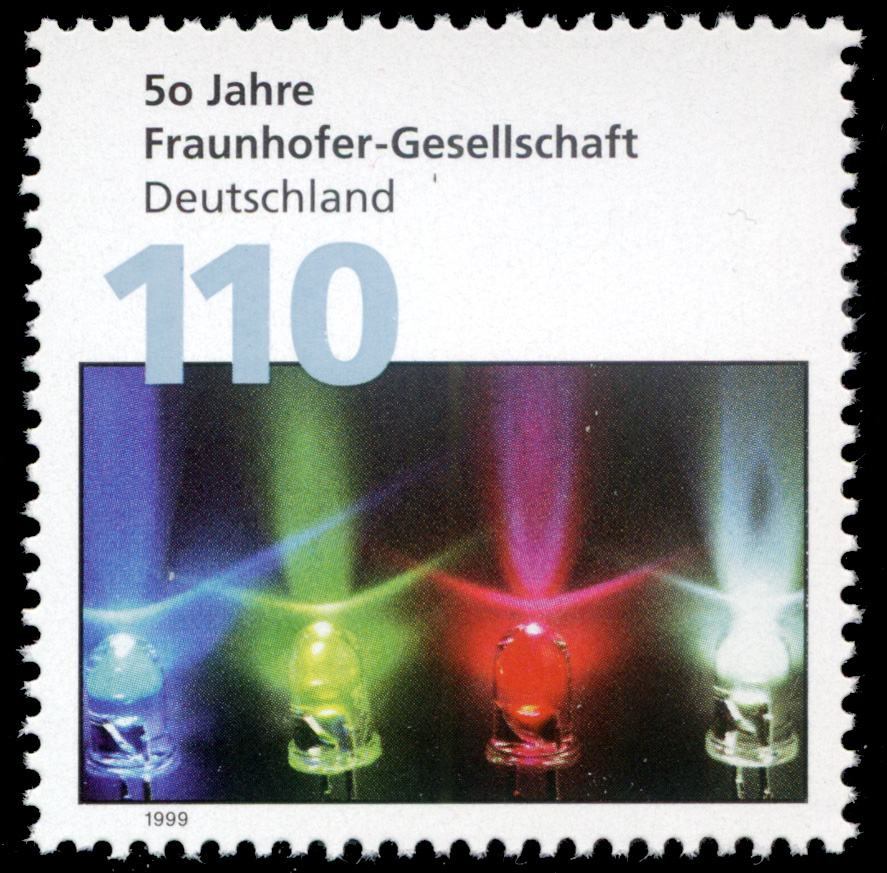
A German stamp: 50 years of the Fraunhofer-Gesellschaft

Fraunhofer was founded in Munich on 26 March 1949, by representatives of industry and academia and the governments of Bavaria, Hesse and Württemberg. In 1952, the German Federal Ministry for Economic Affairs declared the Fraunhofer-Gesellschaft to be the third part of the non-university German research landscape (alongside the German Research Foundation and the Max Planck institutes). From 1954, Fraunhofer's first institutes were established. By 1956, it was also providing administrative assistance in the area of defence research in collaboration with the German Federal Ministry of Defense. In 1959, the Fraunhofer-Gesellschaft comprised nine institutes with 135 employees and a budget of DM 3.6 million.

In 1968, Fraunhofer became the target of public criticism for its role in military research. By 1969, Fraunhofer had more than 1,200 employees in 19 institutes, with a budget of DM 33 million. At this time, a commission for the promotion of the development of the Fraunhofer-Gesellschaft planned the further development of the Fraunhofer-Gesellschaft. In 1972, it proposed a financing model that would make Fraunhofer dependent on its commercial success. This would later come to be known as the Fraunhofer model. The model was agreed to by the federal cabinet and the Joint Commission of the Federal and States Governments (Bund-Länder-Komission) in 1973. In the same year, the executive board and central administration moved into joint accommodation at Leonrodstrasse 54 in Munich.

In 1977, a general agreement on research promotion came into force stipulating that the political ownership of Fraunhofer would be shared by the German Federal Ministries of Defense and Research. In 1984, Fraunhofer had 3,500 employees in 33 institutes and a research budget of DM 360 million. Five years later, in 1989, the number of employees had increased to nearly 6,400, with Fraunhofer operating 37 institutes with a total budget of DM 700 million. In 1991, Fraunhofer faced the challenge of integrating numerous research establishments in former East Germany. By 1993, Fraunhofer's total budget exceeded DM 1 billion. In 1994, Fraunhofer USA, Inc., was founded to manage the activities of the Fraunhofer-Gesellschaft in the U.S.

The year 2000 marked a noteworthy success at the Fraunhofer Institute for Integrated Circuits IIS. The institute was awarded the Deutscher Zukunftspreis (German Future Prize) for developing the audio format MP3, which later on developed into a worldwide de facto standard. Between 2000 and 2001, the IT research institution GMD – Forschungszentrum Informationstechnik (Information Technology Research Center) was integrated into Fraunhofer at the initiative of the German Federal Ministry for Education and Research. In 2001, Fraunhofer Venture, a technology transfer office, was established in order to enable employees and founders to build internationally successful companies from cutting-edge Fraunhofer technology. One year later, in 2002, ownership of the Heinrich-Hertz-Institut für Nachrichtentechnik Berlin GmbH, which belonged to the Leibniz Association, was transferred to Fraunhofer. With this integration, the Fraunhofer-Gesellschaft's budget exceeded 1 billion euros for the first time. In 2003, Fraunhofer headquarters moved to its own building in Hanstrasse 27 c in Munich. Two years later, the Fraunhofer Technology Academy was founded in collaboration with the University of St. Gallen, RWTH Aachen University, and the Hagen University of Distance Learning. In the same year, Fraunhofer's industrial revenues rose to 36 percent (a new record), helping to boost the organization's total business volume by 17 percent to €1.25 billion. In 2007, Fraunhofer Attract was introduced, which is designed to help Fraunhofer recruit outstanding independent research scientists with innovative ideas. 2009, the former institutes of the Forschungsgesellschaft für Angewandte Naturwissenschaften (Research Society for Applied Sciences) were converted into Fraunhofer institutes. In the following years, Fraunhofer continued to grow. In 2015, its budget amounted to more than €2.1 billion. On 26 March 2024, Fraunhofer celebrated its 75th anniversary.

== Presidents ==
The following individuals have served as presidents of the Fraunhofer Society:

Order	Name	Term started	Term ended	Time of office	Notes
1	Walther Gerlach	1949	1951	1–2 years	
2	Wilhelm Roelen	1951	1955	3–4 years	
3	Hermann von Siemens	1955	1964	8–9 years	
4	Franz Kollmann	1964	1968	3–4 years	
5	Christian Otto Mohr	1968	1974	5–6 years	
6	Heinz Keller	1974	1982	7–8 years	
7	Max Syrbe	1982	1993	10–11 years	
8	Hans-Jürgen Warnecke	1993	2002	8–9 years	
9	Hans-Jörg Bullinger	2002	2012	9–10 years	
10	Reimund Neugebauer	2012	2023	10–11 years	
11	Holger Hanselka	2023	incumbent	2–3 years	

== See also ==
- German Research Foundation
- Helmholtz Association
- Leibniz Association
- Max Planck Society
