= Reimund Neugebauer =

German mechanical engineer and professor (born 1953)

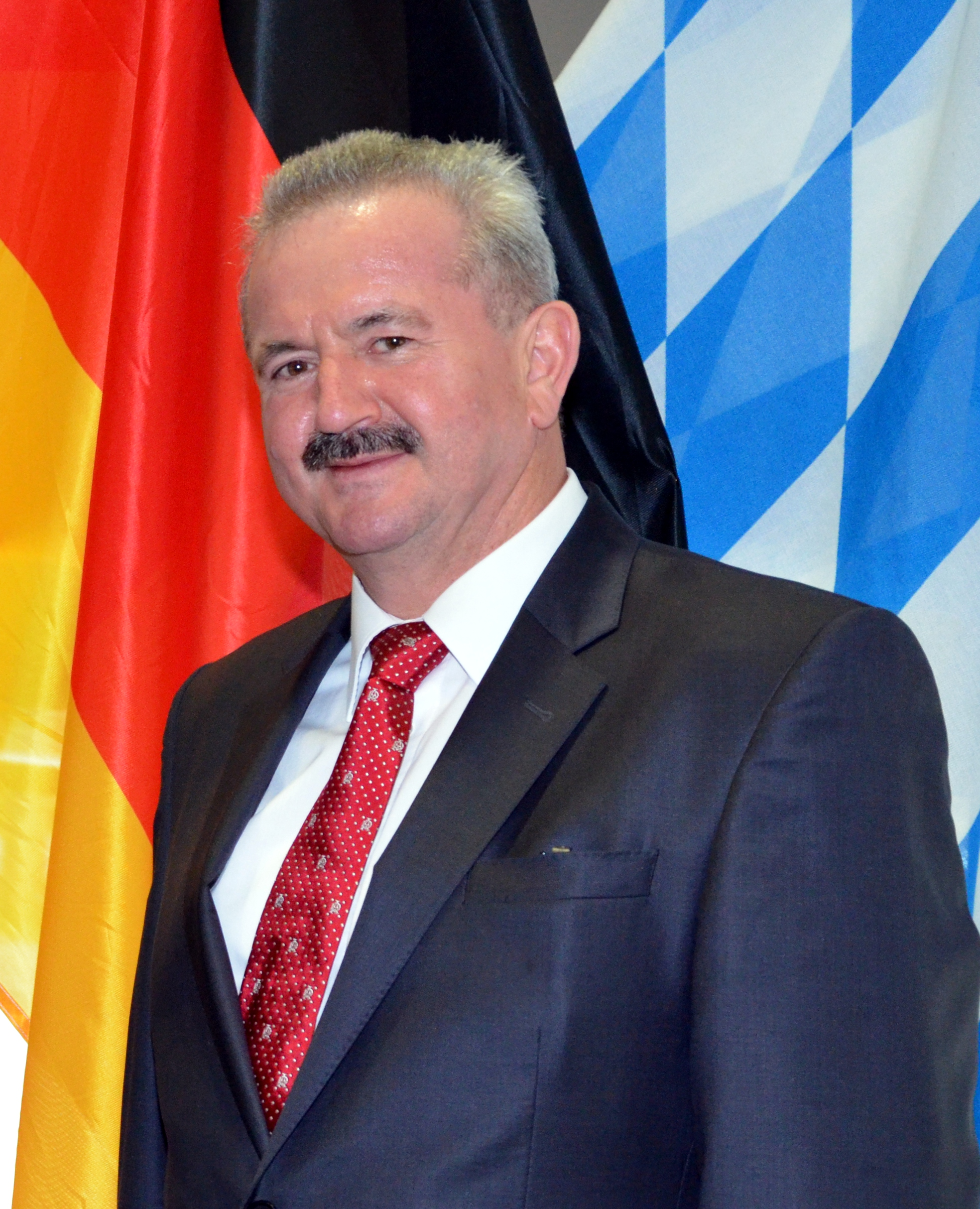
Reimund Neugebauer

Reimund Neugebauer (born 27 June 1953 in Esperstedt am Kyffhäuser) is a German mechanical engineer and professor who has been working in the field of machine tools and forming processes. From 2012 to 2023 he was President of the Fraunhofer Society, the largest research organization in Europe.

== Life ==
Reimund Neugebauer graduated in 1979 from the Dresden University of Technology (TU Dresden) with a degree in Machine Tool Design. From 1979 until 1984 he was a scientific associate and a senior scientific assistant at the TU Dresden, where he received his doctorate in 1984 and habilitated in 1989.

After the founding of the Fraunhofer Institute for Machine Tools and Forming Technology IWU in 1992 he became one of the Managing Directors. After the departure of Rolf Umbach in 1994 he was appointed as the sole managing director of Fraunhofer IWU. He held this position for 21 years, until September 2012.

In 1993 he became Chair of the Department of Machine Tools at the Chemnitz University of Technology and since 2000 he has been the Managing Director of the Chemnitz University's Institute for Machine Tools and Production Processes. On 1 October 2012 he took office as the tenth President of the Fraunhofer Society, the largest research organization in Europe, from Hans-Jörg Bullinger.

Neugebauer is a Fellow of the International Academy for Production Engineering (CIRP) and a member of German Academy of Science and Engineering (acatech). From 2010 to 2011 he was the acting president of the German Academic Society for Production Engineering (WGP). Since 2014 he has been a member of the German National Academy of Sciences Leopoldina. In 2015, Neugebauer was appointed co-chair of the German federal government's High-Tech Forum, the central advisory board for the development and implementation of Germany's high-tech strategy. Since 2015, he has been serving as a member of the European Commission's High-level Group of Personalities on Defence Research chaired by Elżbieta Bieńkowska.

Reimund Neugebauer resigned from his post as President of the Fraunhofer-Gesellschaft on 25 May 2023. He is followed by Holger Hanselka, who is the 11th president of the Fraunhofer-Gesellschaft.

== Awards and honours ==
- Officer's Cross of the Order of Merit of the Federal Republic of Germany (Verdienstkreuz 1. Klasse des Verdienstordens der Bundesrepublik Deutschland) (2005)
- Honorary doctorate awarded by the University of Technology, Munich (2012)
- Order of Merit (Verdienstorden) of the German State of Saxony (2012)
- Honorary doctorate awarded by the Stellenbosch University, South Africa (2013)
- Honorary doctorate awarded by the Czech Technical University in Prague (2014)
- Erich Siebel Medal, bestowed by the European Research Association for Sheet Metal Working (2014)
