= Esperstedt, Thuringia =

- Ortsteil of Bad Frankenhausen
- Interactive map of Esperstedt, Thuringia
- Location within Germany Location within Thuringia
- Coordinates: 51°23′5″N 11°12′5″E
- Country: Germany
- State: Thuringia
- District: Kyffhäuserkreis
- Town: Bad Frankenhausen

Area
  - Total: 9.3 km^{2} (3.6 sq mi)
- Elevation: 127 m (417 ft)

Population (2007-12-31)
  - Total: 648
  - Density: 70/km^{2} (180/sq mi)
- Time zone: UTC+01:00 (CET)
  - Summer (DST): UTC+02:00 (CEST)
- Postal codes: 06567
- Dialling codes: 034671
- Vehicle registration: KYF

Esperstedt (German pronunciation: [ˈɛspɐʃtɛt]) is a former municipality in the district Kyffhäuserkreis, in Thuringia, Germany. Since 1 December 2007, it is part of the town Bad Frankenhausen.
