= Salz, Bavaria =

Salz
- Municipality
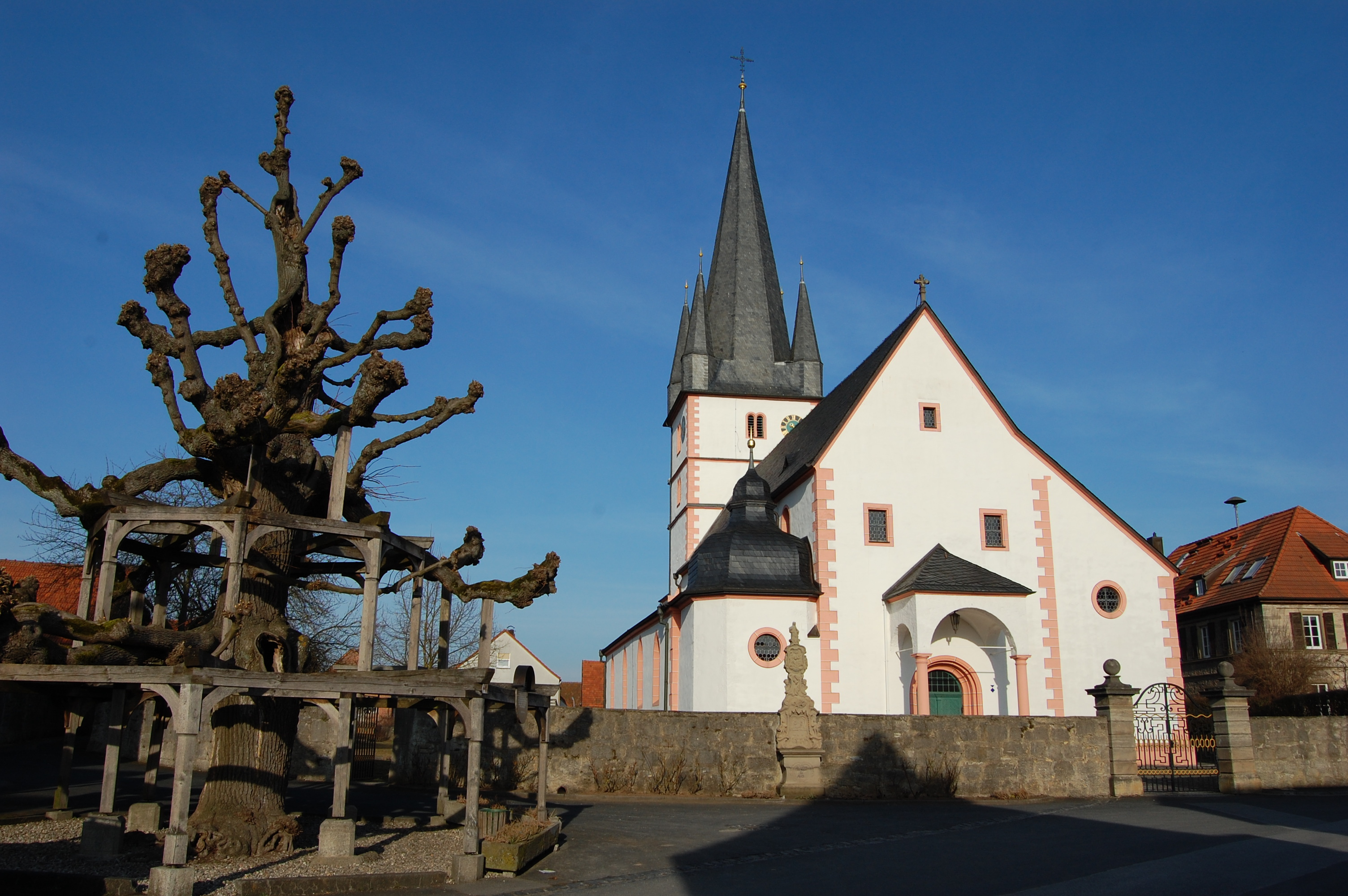
- Church of the Assumption of the Virgin Mary

- Coat of arms

- Location of Salz within Rhön-Grabfeld district
- Interactive map of Salz
- Location within Germany Location within Bavaria
- Coordinates: 50°18′N 10°13′E
- Country: Germany
- State: Bavaria
- Admin. region: Unterfranken
- District: Rhön-Grabfeld
- Municipal assoc.: Bad Neustadt an der Saale

Government
  - Mayor (2020–26): Martin Schmitt (CSU)

Area
  - Total: 8.65 km^{2} (3.34 sq mi)
- Elevation: 234 m (768 ft)

Population (2025-12-31)
  - Total: 2,278
  - Density: 263/km^{2} (682/sq mi)
- Time zone: UTC+01:00 (CET)
  - Summer (DST): UTC+02:00 (CEST)
- Postal codes: 97616
- Dialling codes: 09771
- Vehicle registration: NES
- Website: www.salz.de

Salz (German pronunciation: [zalt]) is a municipality in the district of Rhön-Grabfeld in Bavaria in Germany.

== Notable people ==
- Ludwig Elsbett, German engineer and inventor
