= Fraunhofer Institute for Electron Beam and Plasma Technology =

Research institute in Dresden, Germany

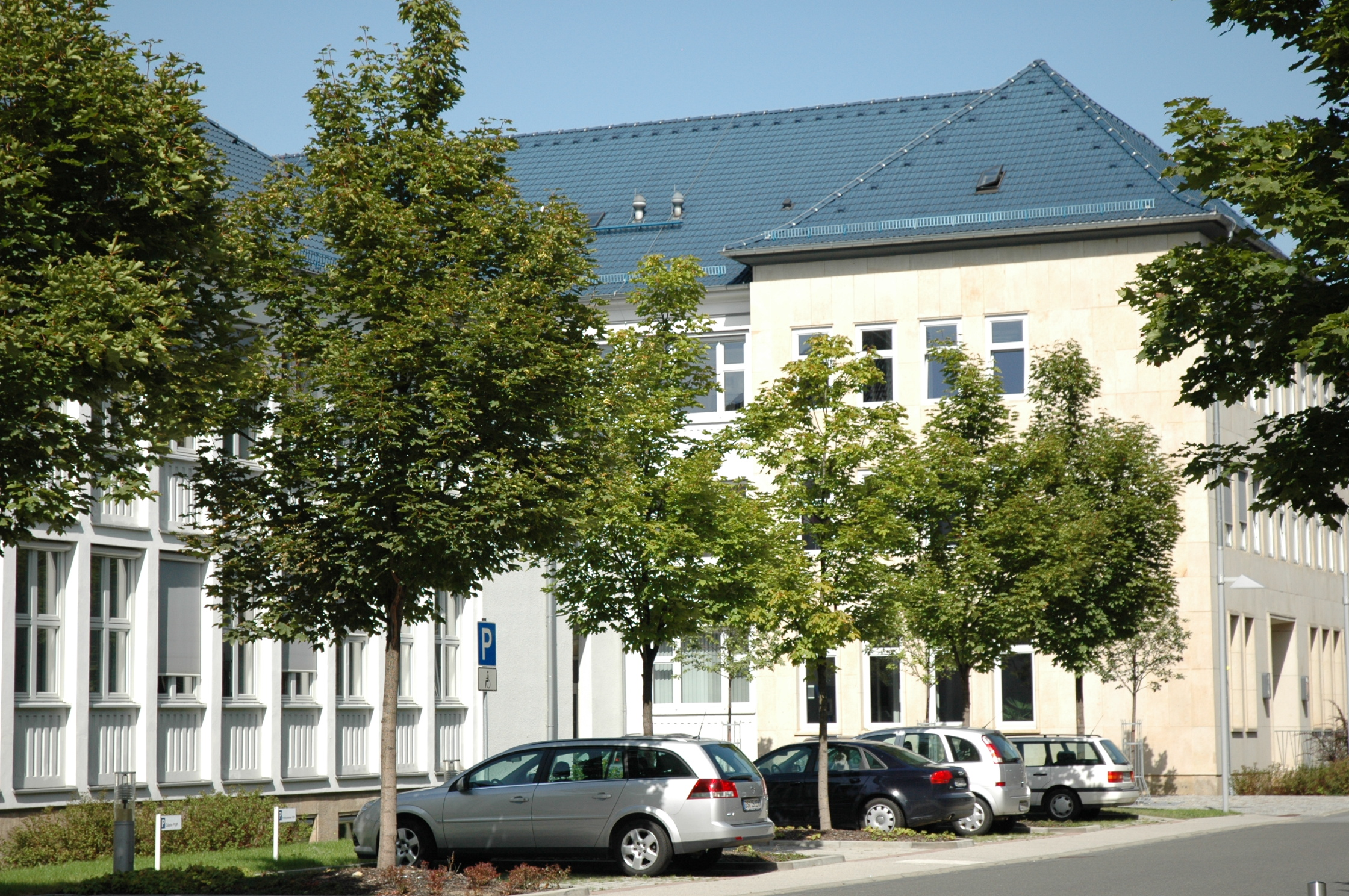
- The research institute building in 2007
- Other name: German: Fraunhoferinstitut fur Elektronenstrahl und Plasmatechnik; Fraunhofer FEP
- Parent institution: Fraunhofer-Gesellschaft
- Founder: Siegfried Schiller
- Established: 1991; 35 years ago
- Focus: Materials science; film and electron beam technology
- Director: Elizabeth von Hauff
- Staff: 150 (as of 2024)
- Budget: €11 million (as of 2024)
- Formerly called: Manfred von Ardenne Research Institute
- Location: Winterbergstraße 28, Dresden, Germany
- Coordinates: 51°1′47.40″N 13°46′53.14″E
- Interactive map of Fraunhofer Institute for Electron Beam and Plasma Technology
- Website: fep.fraunhofer.de (in German)

The Fraunhofer Institute for Electron Beam and Plasma Technology (German: Fraunhoferinstitut fur Elektronenstrahl und Plasmatechnik, abbreviated as FEP), also known as Fraunhofer FEP, is an institution of the Fraunhofer-Gesellschaft based in Dresden, Germany. The institute conducts applied research and development in materials science. The Fraunhofer FEP is a member of the Fraunhofer Group for Light and Surfaces, to which six Fraunhofer Institutes belong. Its current director is Elizabeth von Hauff.

== History ==
The institute was founded in 1991 under the leadership of Siegfried Schiller from working groups of the former Forschungsinstitut Manfred von Ardenne (Manfred von Ardenne Research Institute) in Dresden. This predecessor institute worked to develop, test, and mature thin-film technologies, and these activities continue at the Fraunhofer FEP.

In 2016/17, the FEP succeeded in producing OLED electrodes from graphene for the first time. The process was developed and optimized in the EU-funded project "Gladiator" (Graphene Layers: Production, Characterization and Integration), together with partners from industry and research.

In 2024, the institute employed approximately 150 people (not including students), and had expenditures of €11 million.

== Research and development ==
One of the Fraunhofer FEP's main areas of work is thin film technology, including photovoltaics. This includes the coating of plates, strips and components made of different materials with various layers or layer systems, such as special layers for displays and forgery-proof labels, and energy-efficient integration of photovoltaics into building designs. The institute also works in the field of electron beam technology. The electron beam is used as a precise tool for welding, vaporizing or modifying the surface layer of metals.

The institute is divided into six different business units:

- Flexible products
- Coating of metallic sheets and strips, energy technologies
- Development of Customized Electron Beam Systems and Technologies
- Coating of parts
- Precision coating
- Medical and biotechnological applications

== Collaborations ==
Since 2005, the institute has been a member of the Competence Network Industrial Plasma Surface Technology (INPLAS); and is also a member of the Fraunhofer Group for Light & Surfaces.

Within Dresden, the Fraunhofer FEP is a member of the Dresden-concept scientific network, in which other Fraunhofer Institutes and institutes of other disciplines as well as the TU Dresden and other universities are also organized.
