= Peasants' War Panorama =

Public monument in Thuringia

Coordinates: 51°21′58″N 11°6′12″E

Panorama Museum
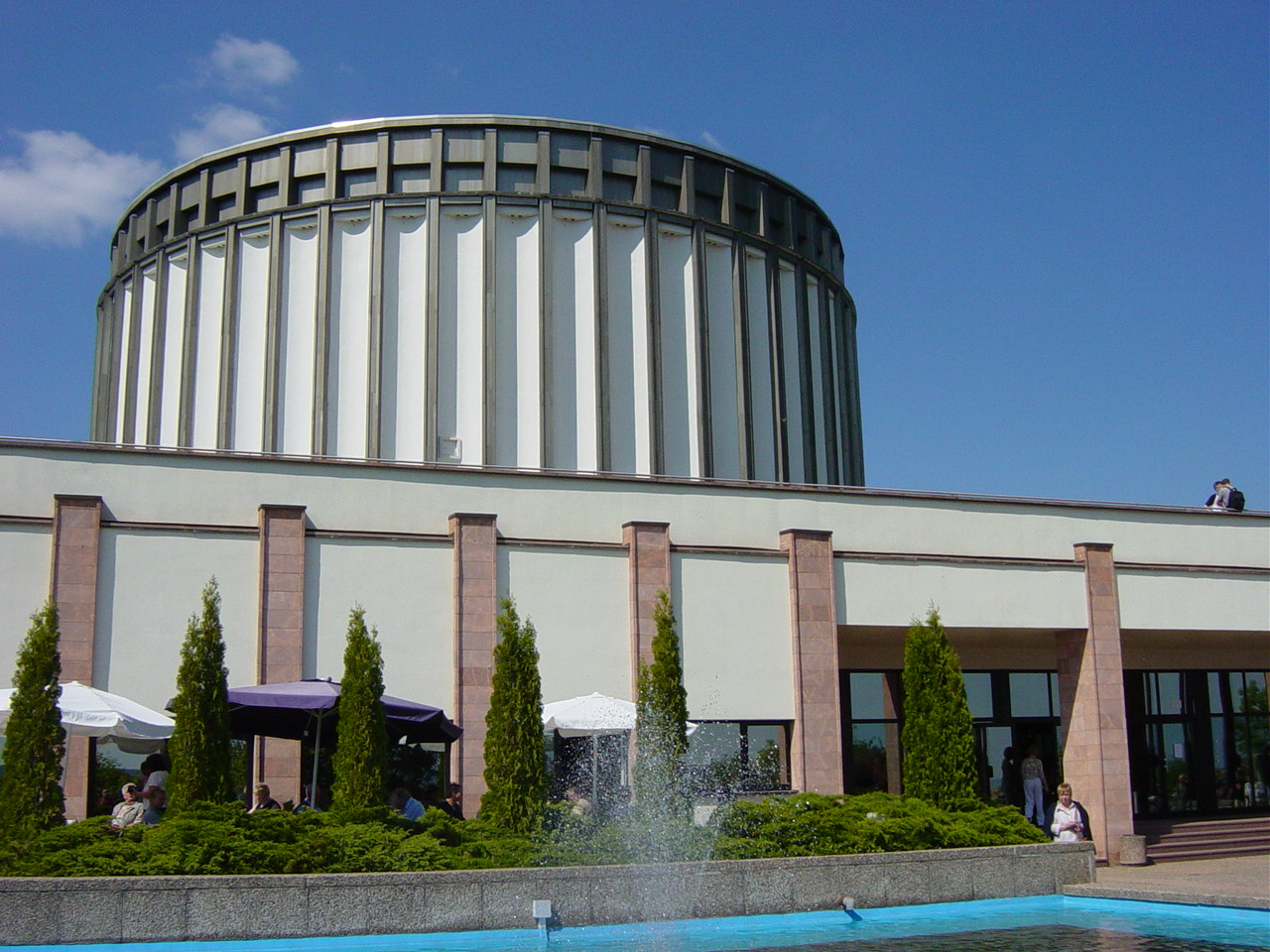
- Artist: Werner Tübke
- Year: 1976–1987
- Medium: Oil on canvas
- Dimensions: 14 m × 123 m (46 ft × 404 ft)
- Location: Bad Frankenhausen

The Peasants' War Panorama (German: Bauernkriegspanorama) is a public monument in Bad Frankenhausen, Thuringia, Germany. It houses the monumental painting Early Bourgeois Revolution in Germany (German: Frühbürgerliche Revolution in Deutschland) by East German painter Werner Tübke, executed from 1976 to 1987. The painting spans 14 metres (46 ft) by 123 metres (404 ft).

The project was commissioned by the East German government to commemorate the Battle of Frankenhausen, fought on 15 May 1525 during the German Peasants' War.

== Overview ==
The painting was commissioned in 1976 by the Ministry of Culture of East Germany. It was finished in 1987. The canvas was woven in one piece at the textile factory in Sursk, Soviet Union, and weighs 1.1 tons. Tübke dedicated 480 workdays to the painting and used a total of 90,000 tubes of paint.

Despite the commission's obvious ideological motivations, the painting is neither typical military art nor socialist realism. Instead, Tübke created an immense allegory of Renaissance society with more than 3000 characters, containing strong fantastical and surreal elements. The artist named German Renaissance painters Albrecht Dürer and Lucas Cranach the Elder as his most important influences; his style is sometimes also considered as magical realism.

The museum opened to the public on 14 September 1989, in time for the 500th anniversary of the birth of Thomas Müntzer.
