= Ringleben, Kyffhäuserkreis =

Ringleben
- Ortsteil of Bad Frankenhausen
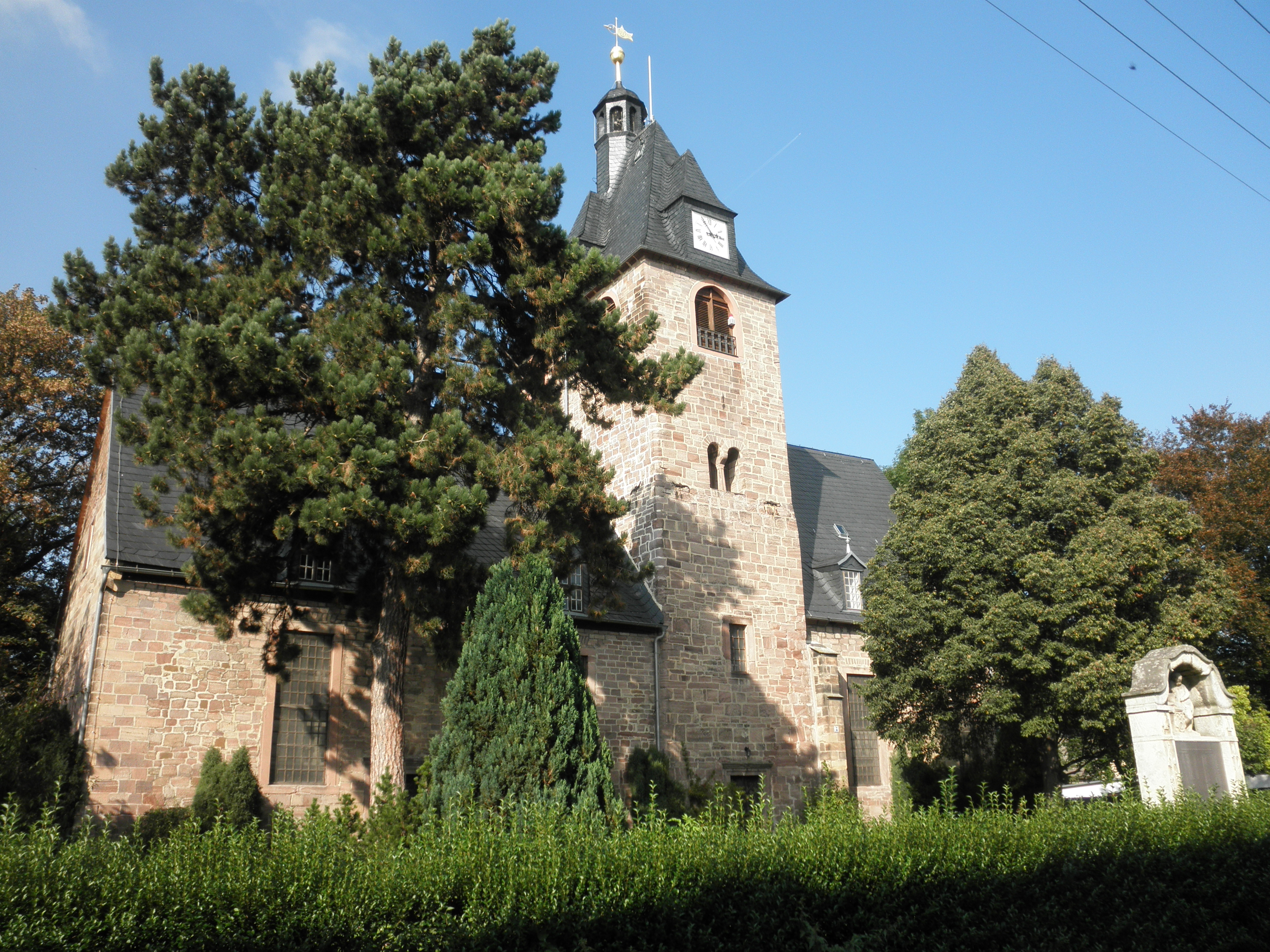

- Coat of arms
- Interactive map of Ringleben
- Location within Germany Location within Thuringia
- Coordinates: 51°22′N 11°13′E
- Country: Germany
- State: Thuringia
- District: Kyffhäuserkreis
- Town: Bad Frankenhausen

Area
  - Total: 15.04 km^{2} (5.81 sq mi)
- Elevation: 125 m (410 ft)

Population (2022)
  - Total: 780
  - Density: 52/km^{2} (130/sq mi)
- Time zone: UTC+01:00 (CET)
  - Summer (DST): UTC+02:00 (CEST)
- Postal codes: 06556
- Dialling codes: 03466
- Vehicle registration: KYF

Ringleben (German pronunciation: [ˈʁɪŋˌleːbn̩]) is a village and a former municipality in the district Kyffhäuserkreis, in Thuringia, Germany. Since 1 January 2019, it is part of the town Bad Frankenhausen.

== Gallery ==

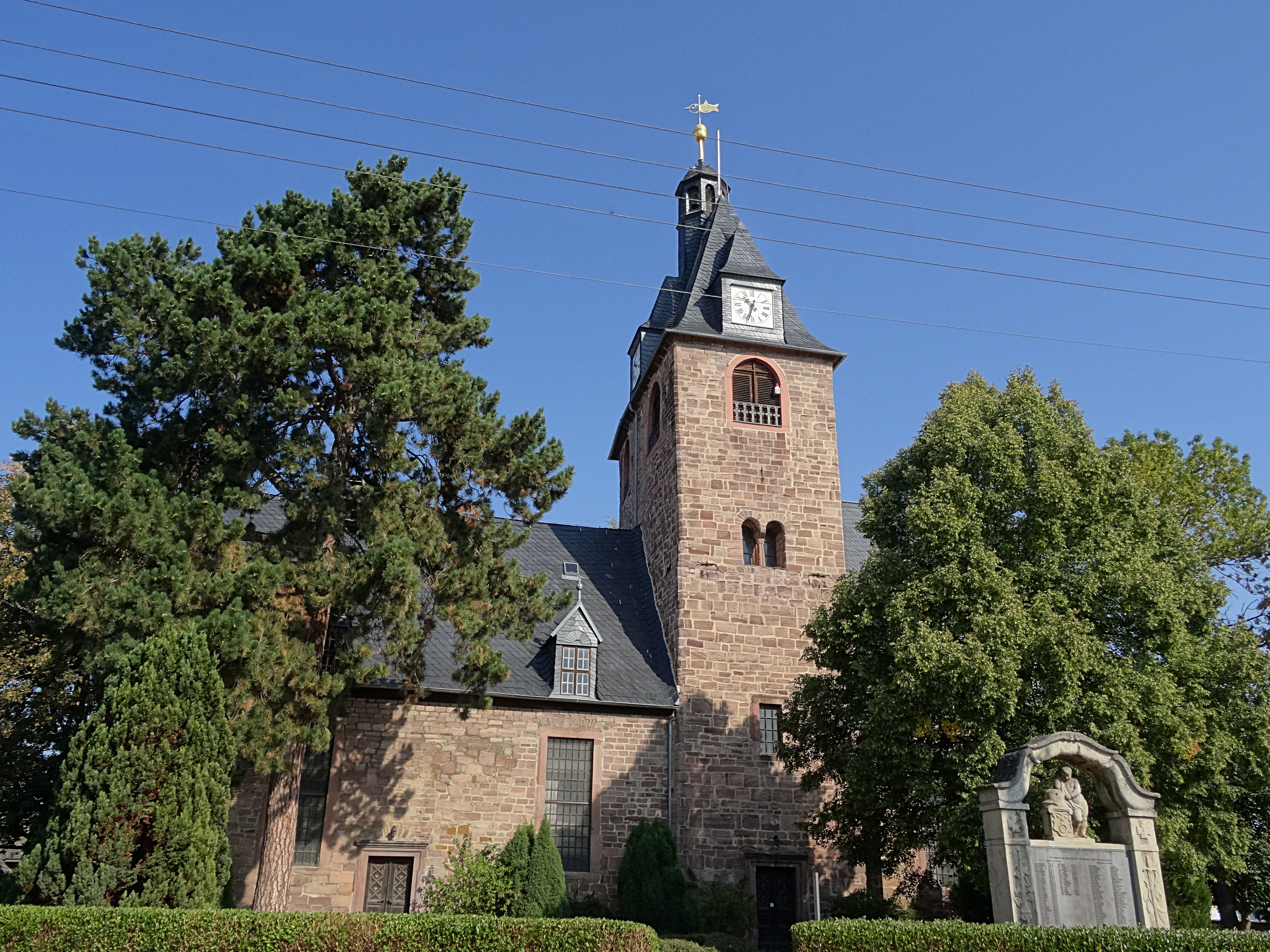

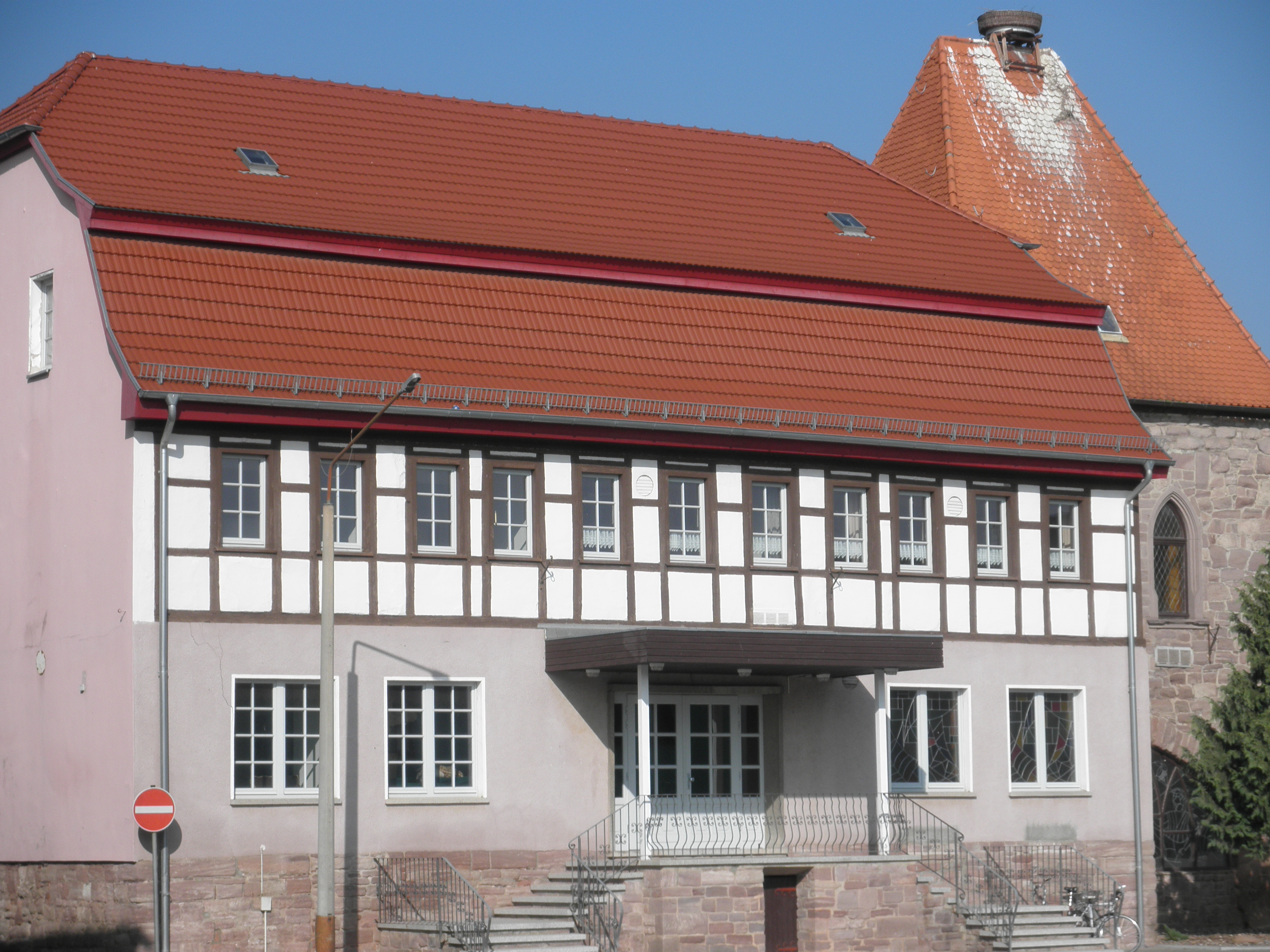
