= Werner Tübke =

German painter

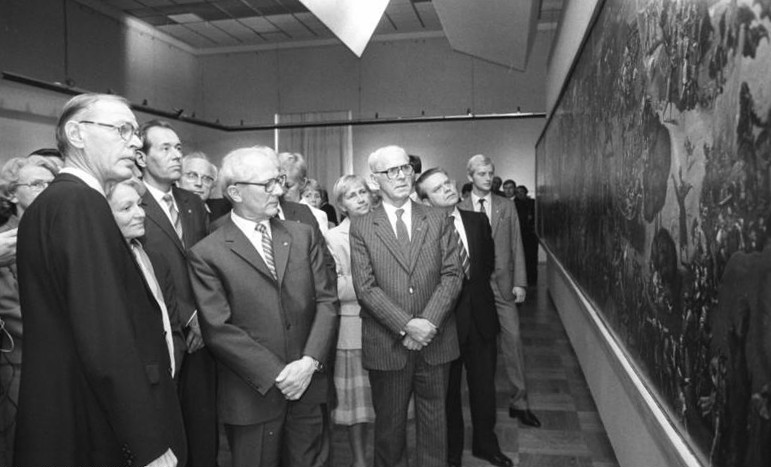
- Tübke (left) presenting a 1:10 version of Early Bourgeois Revolution in Germany to Erich Honecker
- Born: 30 July 1929; Schönebeck, Germany
- Died: 27 May 2004 (aged 74); Leipzig, Germany
- Known for: painting
- Notable work: Early Bourgeois Revolution in Germany, also known as Peasants' War Panorama
- Movement: Leipzig School, Magical Realism

Werner Tübke (30 July 1929 – 27 May 2004) was a German painter, best known for his monumental Peasants' War Panorama located in Bad Frankenhausen. Associated with the Leipzig School, he is "one of the few East German artists who gained recognition in West Germany."

== Early Bourgeois Revolution in Germany ==
Tübke's magnum opus, Early Bourgeois Revolution in Germany, has a size of 14 metres (46 ft) by 123 metres (404 ft). It depicts a scene from the German Peasants' War, which took place from 1524 to 1525.
