= Elsbett engine =

Diesel engine

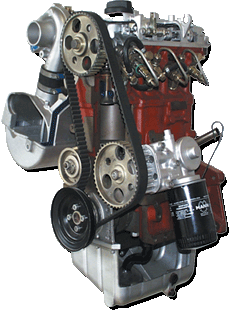
Elsbett 3-cylinder straight motor

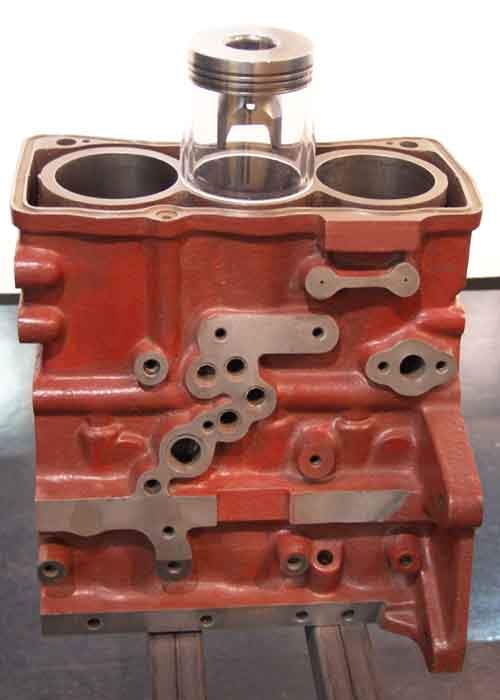
Elsbett 3-cylinder straight motor block

The Elsbett, or Elko ("Elsbett Konstruktion") is an 89 horsepower (66 kW), direct-injection diesel engine invented by Ludwig Elsbett. It is designed to run on pure plant oil (PVO). Elsbett AG, the current manufacturer, is based in Thalmässing, Bavaria.

The design limits of the loss of energy as heat by a variety of technologies:

- The fuel charge is injected in such a manner as to "blend perfectly with the air" and combust within a central core of hot air, not contacting the chamber walls.
- The engine also doesn't use any water cooling. Instead, oil is used as the singular coolant.
