= Johann Adolph Frohne =

German theologian

- Born: 11 January 1652; Eigenrieden, Unstrut-Hainich-Kreis, Thüringen, Germany
- Died: 12 November 1713 (aged 61); Mühlhausen, Unstrut-Hainich-Kreis, Thüringen, Germany
- Occupation: Theologian

Johann Adolph Frohne (11 January 1652 – 12 November 1713) was a German theologian of the 17th century.

== Life ==
He was born in Eigenrieden, Unstrut-Hainich-Kreis, Thüringen, Germany on 11 Jan 1652 January 11, 1652.

His parents were Johann Bernhard Frohne and Anna Catharina Osswald.

He died on 12 Nov 1713 in Mühlhausen, Unstrut-Hainich-Kreis, Thüringen, Germany.

== Education ==
He received his doctoral degree in theology in the year 1693.

== Career ==
In 1678, he became a rector and preacher and Lemgo.

He succeeded his father in 1691 as preacher at Mühlhausen.

== Bibliography ==
He is the author of a number of notable books:

- Theologia Definitiva comprehendens
- Definitiones Theologicas tam Theoreticas, quam Practicas
- Charismata divina ecclesiae Christi gratiose concessa : Programma ad Synod. Mohus. ad July 21, 1696
- Grundlicher Beweis des geistlichen Priesterthums
