= Reifenstein Abbey =

Coordinates: 51°20′50″N 10°21′40″E

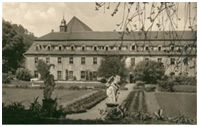
The abbey in the 1930s

Reifenstein Abbey was a Cistercian abbey near the present village of Kleinbartloff in the Eichsfeld in Thuringia, Germany.

== First building ==
It was founded on 1 August 1162 by Count Ernst of Tonna-Gleichen, on a site then known as Albolderode, and was settled by monks from Volkenroda Abbey near Mühlhausen.

The abbey was economically successful and by the end of the thirteenth century had acquired about fifty estates in the neighbourhood. Little is known however of its internal affairs: even the sequence of the abbots is uncertain.

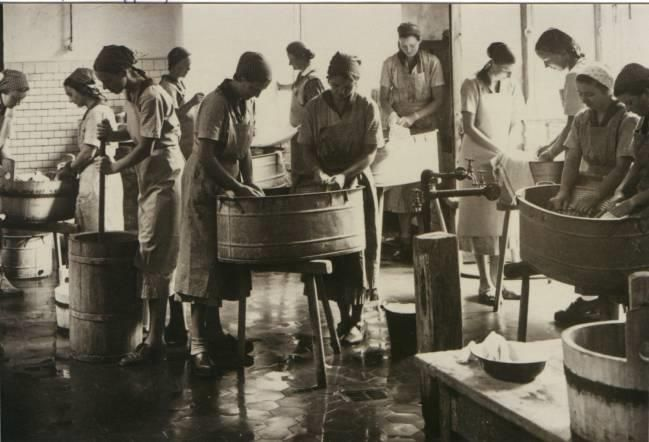
Laundry classes in the 1930s

In 1521 Heinrich Pfeiffer, a monk at Reifenstein, left the abbey to become a Lutheran. He preached rebellion in his native town of Mühlhausen, shared the leadership in the German Peasants' War in Thuringia with Thomas Münzer, and in May 1525, burnt Reifenstein Abbey to the ground. After the Battle of Frankenhausen he was captured near Eisenach and executed, dying impenitent. In 1524 there had only been six monks left in Reifenstein, which after the fire underwent a complete decline: in 1539 only one remained in the ruins, and shortly afterwards the site was completely deserted. In 1575 there was again a single monk, and in 1579, five or six, but they led so lawless a life that Reifenstein, according to a contemporary report, resembled a robbers' cave.

== Second building ==
The church was restored in 1582 and the monastery in 1585. The exemplary Abbot Philipp Busse (1589–1639) re-established discipline and order, but during the Thirty Years' War the abbey was pillaged seven times and almost reduced to ashes, Abbot Philipp was carried off as a prisoner, and six or seven monks were murdered. The few remaining monks sought shelter in caves, and begged bread from the peasants.

== Third building ==
The reconstruction of the abbey did not occur until Abbot Wilhelm Streit (1690–1721) took up office. By 1738 it had twenty-four members, and was able to survive the turmoil of the Seven Years' War. Between 1737 and 1743 the new abbey church was spectacularly rebuilt in the Baroque style.

The abbey was dissolved on 2 March 1803, and its territories and assets taken over by the Prussian State. The last abbot was Antonius Löffler (d. 1823). At this time there were 24 monks and three novices. They were allowed to live on the premises, and given a pension; only 9 remained in 1809. The abbey's valuables were dispersed to neighbouring churches. The library of 4000 books and 200 incunabula found its way first to the Gymnasium in Heiligenstadt, and eventually (in 1907) to the State Library in Berlin.

== School (1900-1951) ==
In 1900 a school for young women was established, teaching agriculture and domestic science. About 40 Reifenstein schools were established starting in 1898, and took the name of the abbey.

The school remained in operation until after World War II. Brigitte Albert (later Kay) wrote of her time there in 1942-43:

The large monastic buildings formed a solid three-storey unit containing two inner courtyards. They were in a dell at the edge of the southern Thüringen beechwoods. Their large grounds were totally surrounded by a ten-foot stone wall with one impressive gate. When Bismarck appropriated the monasteries for the State of Prussia, one wing was set aside to administer the rich outlying farmlands. The nearest village was three miles away; the nearest small town, seven. We were a hundred females in utter isolation. Most of our twelve teachers came from the aristocracy. So did many of the girls. The ethos of the school was based on Christianity. We had services both morning and evening. Our manners were those of the long-defunct Prussian court. Our ages were eighteen and above; we were all in uniform; in the evenings after the last chorale we walked past a long line of teachers, curtseying to each and kissing hands with the Principal.

Many of my fellow-students came from large estates and farms which they were expected to run with their future husbands. They included a Princess of Hohenzollern-Sigmaringen, also the daughters of some generals at the front. Within the surrounding walls there lived only one man, who did the heaviest work, especially the ploughing. Everything else we did for ourselves. We had a large, formal Baroque garden at the back; at the end of this garden ornamental stone steps led to a terrace, where we had our summer lunches on large tables. All the food was ceremoniously carried by long lines of girls who were on kitchen duty that day. We had a very large poultry farm which was run on commercial lines and supplied us at a time of miserable rationing with eggs and chickens. The worst birds were the turkeys. When you let them out of their pen into the open run their sharp beaks would go straight for your calves. We had one gander and two geese. In my year one of these produced ten goslings and the other, two. As they ran free in the grounds and birds of prey frequently attacked our chicks, we were anxious that the gander should protect the goose with the large brood. But no such luck: love knows no reason, and he stuck with her rival.

We had large vegetable and fruit gardens and greenhouses, both for propagation and flowers. Lessons were both theory and practice. Most of us were there for one year only, but the teachers were assisted by 'third years' who were due to take their exams as teachers of domestic science. Subjects were needlework, cookery, gardening, animal husbandry, and housekeeping. We kept pigs and goats but no cows or horses.

I learned much, but the main value of the year was in the emphasis on religion and moral values which were subtly anti-Nazi. Several girls had been boarders at the Luisenstiftung in Berlin where their chaplain was Pastor Bonhoeffer, who represented the Bekenntniskirche. As opposed to the Deutsche Kirche within which the majority of Lutheran pastors co-operated with the Nazis, the pastors of the Bekenntniskirche, both Lutheran and Catholic, preached the Gospel with total integrity. Bonhoeffer and Niemoller ended up in a concentration camp. The Catholic Archbishop, Count von Hagen, was in such a strong position that in spite of his courageous teaching the Nazis did not dare to touch him.

My greatest pleasure was in the ample time I could spend on my music and on enjoying our beautiful surroundings on long walks with Deta. Early in the year Deta and I discovered that the little organ in the chapel where our Sunday services were held could easily be made serviceable again: all it needed was the removal of nests which mice had built in the bottom of some of the pipes. We soon learned to play it with its pedals and stops, and in turns one of us played and the other worked the bellows hidden behind a curtain — hard work. I became, almost exclusively, the pianist for morning and evening services in the common-room. I was also allowed to practise in the Principal's room which formed part of the cloisters and had lovely acoustics. During the year we had a fortnight's intensive music-making with specialist teachers. We formed a recorder quartet and did a lot of part-singing, some even from plainsong scores. Both then and during Advent I belonged to a small group who sang in the cloisters after Lights Out. The sound carried to all the dormitories and the whole experience by candlelight remains unforgettable.

She further wrote:

Early in the new year (1943) the fire alarm sounded, calling us all from garden, stables and kitchen to the large common-room. In front of the building stood three large, black Mercedes cars which could only mean that Party officials had arrived... The result of this visit was that we had either to agree to become members of the Nazi Party or the school would be closed and be turned into a training school for young Nazi leaders. After much discussion we all decided to sign the document. We never heard from the Party again, and that was the end of the matter.

== Hospital (1951-) ==
State ownership lasted until after World War II, when in 1951 the site was acquired by the University of Jena for use as a special clinic for tubercular and bone diseases. In 1964, it became the district hospital of the then district of Worbis, and it continues as a hospital to this day: in 2002 it became part of the Eichsfeld Klinikum. A new Catholic chapel was opened in 2004.

The imposing church however was entirely neglected and allowed to fall into ruin. Only the main doorway now remains.
