= Volkenroda Abbey =

Coordinates: 51°15′N 10°34′E

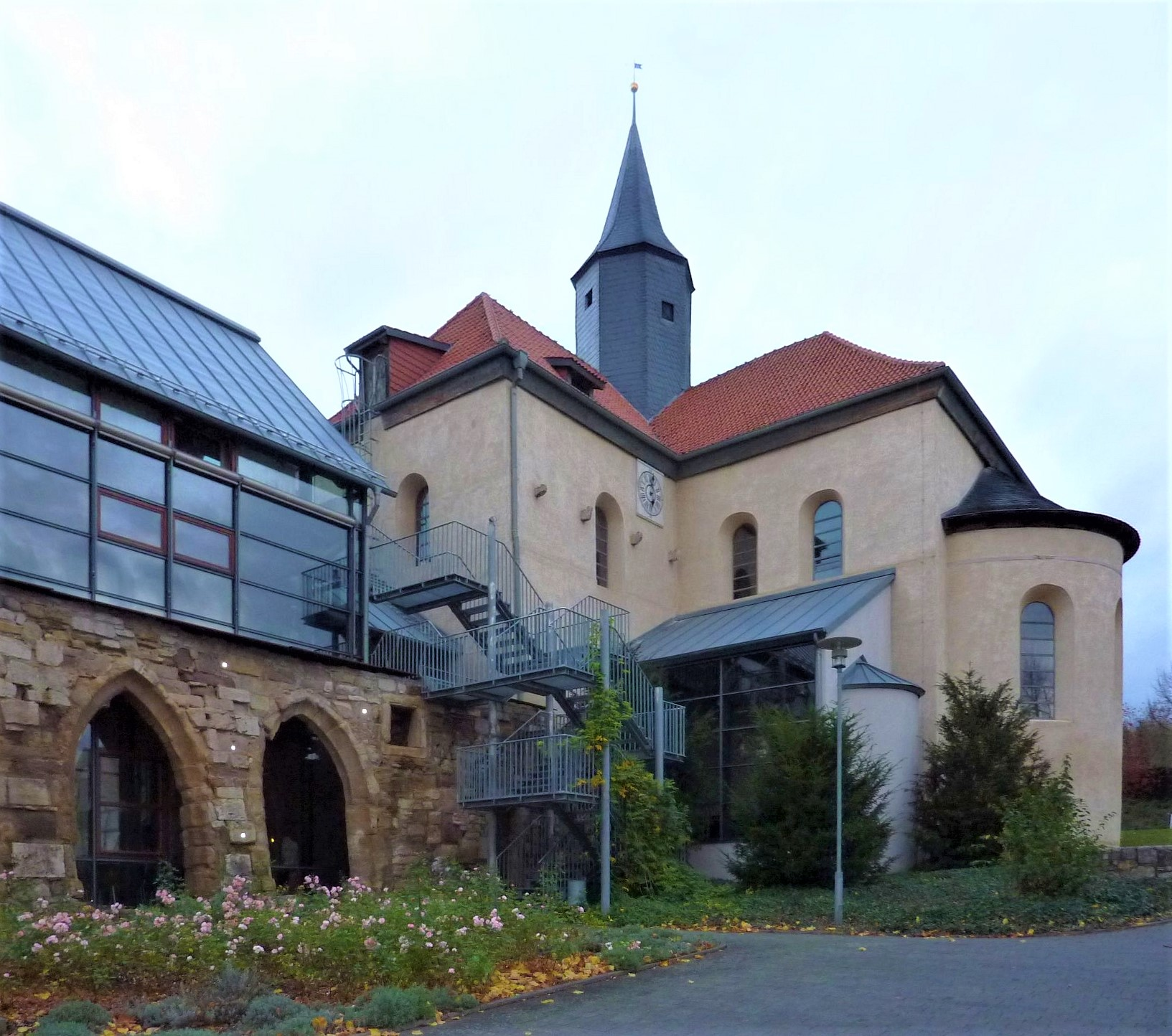
Abbey church at Volkenroda (2013)

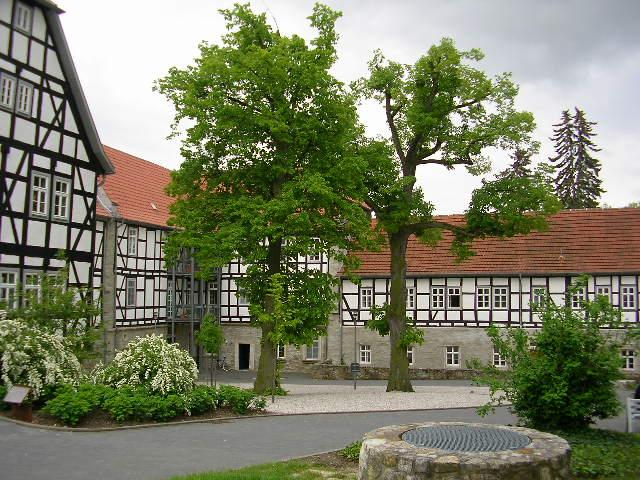
Abbey at Volkenroda (2005)

Volkenroda Abbey (Kloster Volkenroda) is a former Cistercian monastery in the municipality of Körner in the district Unstrut-Hainich-Kreis of Thuringia, Germany.

== History ==
The abbey was founded in 1131 and settled by monks from Altenkamp, although not dedicated until 1250. It was an active centre of Cistercian expansion: among its daughter houses were the monasteries of Waldsassen (1133), Reifenstein (1162), Loccum (1163) and Dobrilugk (1165).

During the German Peasants' War in 1525 the abbey was virtually destroyed and, although restored within a very short time, was dissolved in 1540.

The remains of the buildings were used principally for various agricultural purposes. The abbey church served as the Protestant village church until 1968, when it was shut down because of its derelict condition. The village was designated for "re-settlement" and no further ordinations took place.

=== Reconstruction ===
After the end of the GDR, in 1993 the action group "Wiederaufbau Kloster Volkenroda e. V." ("Reconstruction of Volkenroda Abbey") was established, with the aim of reviving the monastic tradition. From 1994 the "Brotherhood of Jesus" ("Jesus-Bruderschaft") from Hünfelden-Gnadental in the district of Limburg-Weilburg in Hesse took over the buildings and set up a community in them.

In 1996 Volkenroda Abbey was designated as a "Protected Site of Cultural Heritage of European Importance". In the monastery buildings a European Youth Education Centre was established.
