= Rodeberg =

- Interactive map of Rodeberg
- Location within Germany Location within Thuringia
- Coordinates: 51°13′N 10°18′E
- Country: Germany
- State: Thuringia
- District: Unstrut-Hainich-Kreis
- Disbanded: 2024

Area
  - Total: 26.68 km^{2} (10.30 sq mi)
- Elevation: 479 m (1,572 ft)

Population (2022-12-31)
  - Total: 2,033
  - Density: 76.20/km^{2} (197.4/sq mi)
- Time zone: UTC+01:00 (CET)
  - Summer (DST): UTC+02:00 (CEST)
- Postal codes: 99976
- Dialling codes: 036026
- Vehicle registration: UH
- Website: www.rodeberg.de

Rodeberg (German pronunciation: [ˈʁoːdəˌbɛʁk]) is a former municipality in the Unstrut-Hainich-Kreis district of Thuringia, Germany. It was disbanded in January 2024, and its territory was divided between the towns Dingelstädt (Struth) and Mühlhausen (Eigenrieden).
