= Heinrich Pfeiffer =

German preacher

Heinrich Pfeiffer (c. 1500, Mühlhausen – 27 May 1525, Mühlhausen) was a peasant leader in the German Peasants' War.

Pfeiffer was a monk from Reifenstein Abbey who renounced his vows and converted to Protestantism. He first preached in 1523. After the Battle of Frankenhausen, he escaped the siege of Mühlhausen on May 24 but was captured by the nobles' cavalry. He was executed soon after, along with Thomas Müntzer and other peasant leaders.
