= Mühlhausen =

Town in Thuringia, Germany

- Town
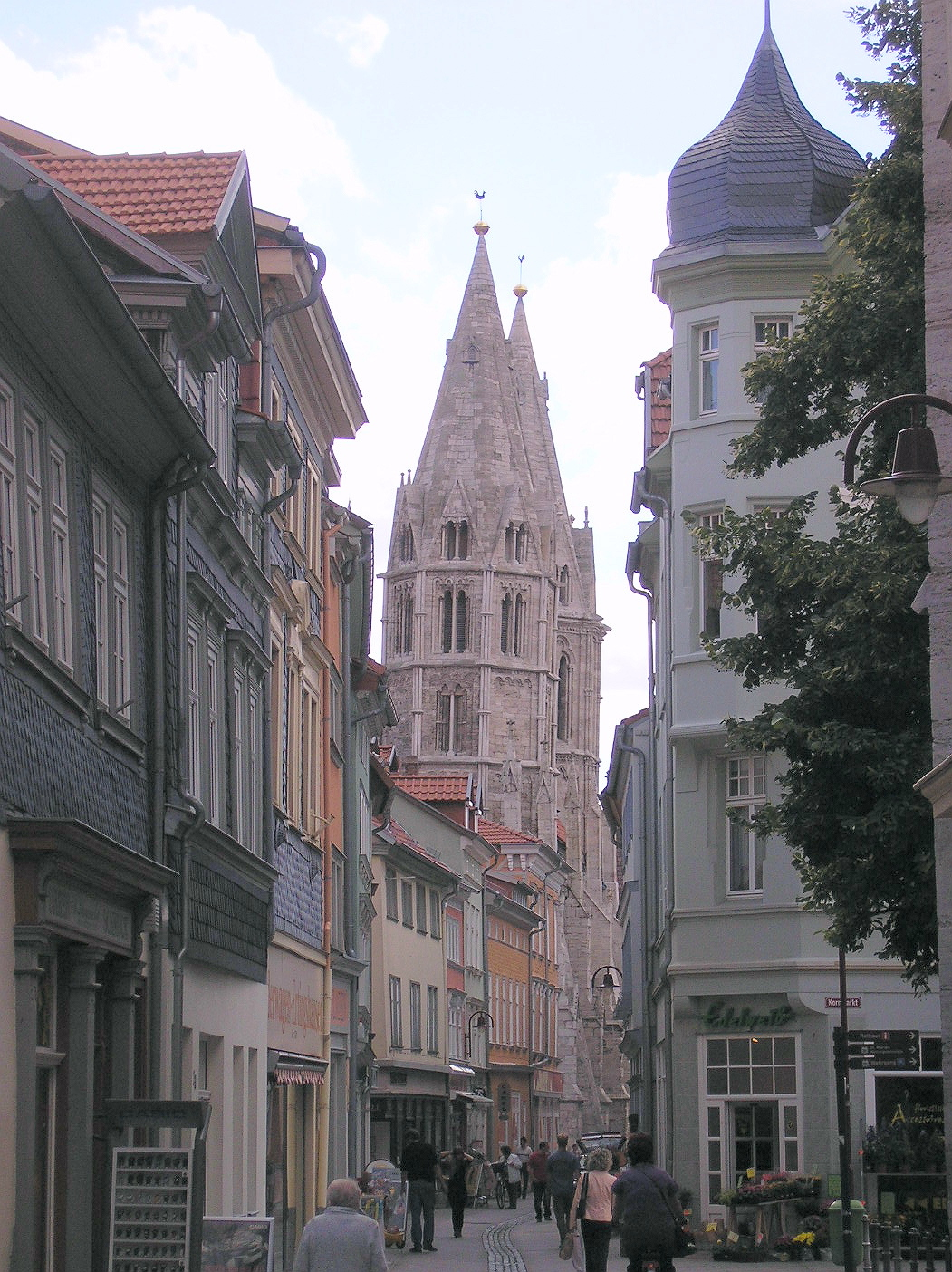
- Divi-Blasii Church seen from Kornmarkt

- Coat of arms

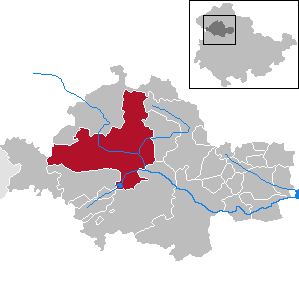
- Location of Mühlhausen within Unstrut-Hainich-Kreis district
- Interactive map of Mühlhausen
- Location within Germany Location within Thuringia
- Coordinates: 51°13′N 10°27′E
- Country: Germany
- State: Thuringia
- District: Unstrut-Hainich-Kreis

Government
  - Mayor (2024–30): Dr. Johannes Bruns (SPD)

Area
  - Total: 150.53 km^{2} (58.12 sq mi)
- Elevation: 216 m (709 ft)

Population (2025-12-31)
  - Total: 36,353
  - Density: 241.50/km^{2} (625.48/sq mi)
- Time zone: UTC+01:00 (CET)
  - Summer (DST): UTC+02:00 (CEST)
- Postal codes: 99974
- Dialling codes: 03601
- Vehicle registration: UH, LSZ, MHL
- Website: www.muehlhausen.de

Mühlhausen (German: [ˈmyːlhaʊzn̩]; officially Mühlhausen/Thüringen) is a town in the northwest of Thuringia, Germany, 5 km (3 miles) north of Niederdorla, the country's geographical centre, 50 km (31 miles) north-west of Erfurt, 65 km (40 miles) east of Kassel and 50 km (31 miles) south-east of Göttingen.

Mühlhausen was first mentioned in 967 and became one of the most important cities in central Germany in the late Middle Ages. In the mid-13th century, it became a Freie Reichsstadt, an independent and republican self-ruled member of the Holy Roman Empire, controlling an area of approximately 220 square kilometres (85 sq mi) and 19 regional villages. Due to its long-distance trade, Mühlhausen was prosperous and influential with a population of 10,000 around 1500. Because it was spared from later destruction, Mühlhausen today has a great variety of historical buildings with one of the largest medieval city centres remaining in Germany, covering a surface of more than 50 hectares within the inner city wall and approximately 200 hectares overall. There are eleven Gothic churches, several patricians’ houses and a nearly completely preserved fortification.

Johann Sebastian Bach worked as the city's organist in 1707–08. The theologian Thomas Müntzer, a leading person in the German Peasants' War, gave sermons here and was executed outside the city walls. John A. Roebling, the constructor of the Brooklyn Bridge, and Friedrich August Stüler, an influential architect in mid-19th-century Prussia, were born in Mühlhausen.

Mühlhausen is within the Thuringian Basin, a flat and fertile area, on the Unstrut river on the eastern edge of the Hainich hills.

== History ==
=== Middle Ages ===
According to legend, in the 5th century Attila stayed at "Burg Mulhus" as a guest of his Thuringii allies before moving on to the Battle of the Catalaunian Plains. Within the north-eastern parts of the city centre around St. George's Church, sizeable archaeological finds have been made, relating to a large settlement of the Thuringii/Francia period (from the 6th to the early 10th century), which can be seen as the origin of the later city. Mühlhausen itself was first mentioned in 967 was part of a territory given by Otto II to his wife Theophanu. It belonged to the Reichsgut ab initio, i.e. there was no territorial lord other than the German emperor and the area was not the emperor's own property, so that it did not go to his son after his death but reverted to his successor as emperor, even if he was from another family. The emperors had a Kaiserpfalz in Mühlhausen, which they often visited from Otto III to Henry III during the 10th and 11th centuries. The election of Philip of Swabia in 1198 ended with a homage in Mühlhausen, attended by Walther von der Vogelweide.

In 1135, Mühlhausen was first referred to as a villa which can be seen as the beginning of the evolution from a settlement to a city. During the early 12th century, the "old town" was set up around the Untermarkt along the Hessenweg, an important trade route between the Kassel and the Erfurt regions. The fortifications were erected after 1170, eventually including 52 towers. In the early 13th century, the "new town" north of Schwemmnotte river followed with a regular grid around St. Mary's Church and Obermarkt with Steinweg as main streets. The Teutonic Knights received St. Blaise's Church (Divi-Blasii) in 1227 and St. Mary's Church in 1243 from the emperor, which ensured them influence in the city and high revenues. The largest monastery of Mühlhausen was the 1227-founded Brückenkloster at Magdalenenweg, a Magdalenians monastery. It held large estates in the region and its buildings were demolished in 1884. The Franciscans came to the city in 1225 and built their monastery around today's Corn Market Church and the Dominicans established a monastery in 1289 near Steinweg; their church was demolished after a fire in 1689, only some walls remained. Jews have lived in Mühlhausen at least since the late 13th century; the Jüdenstraße runs parallel to Steinweg in the new town. During the Black Death Jewish persecutions in 1349, many Mühlhausen Jews were killed.

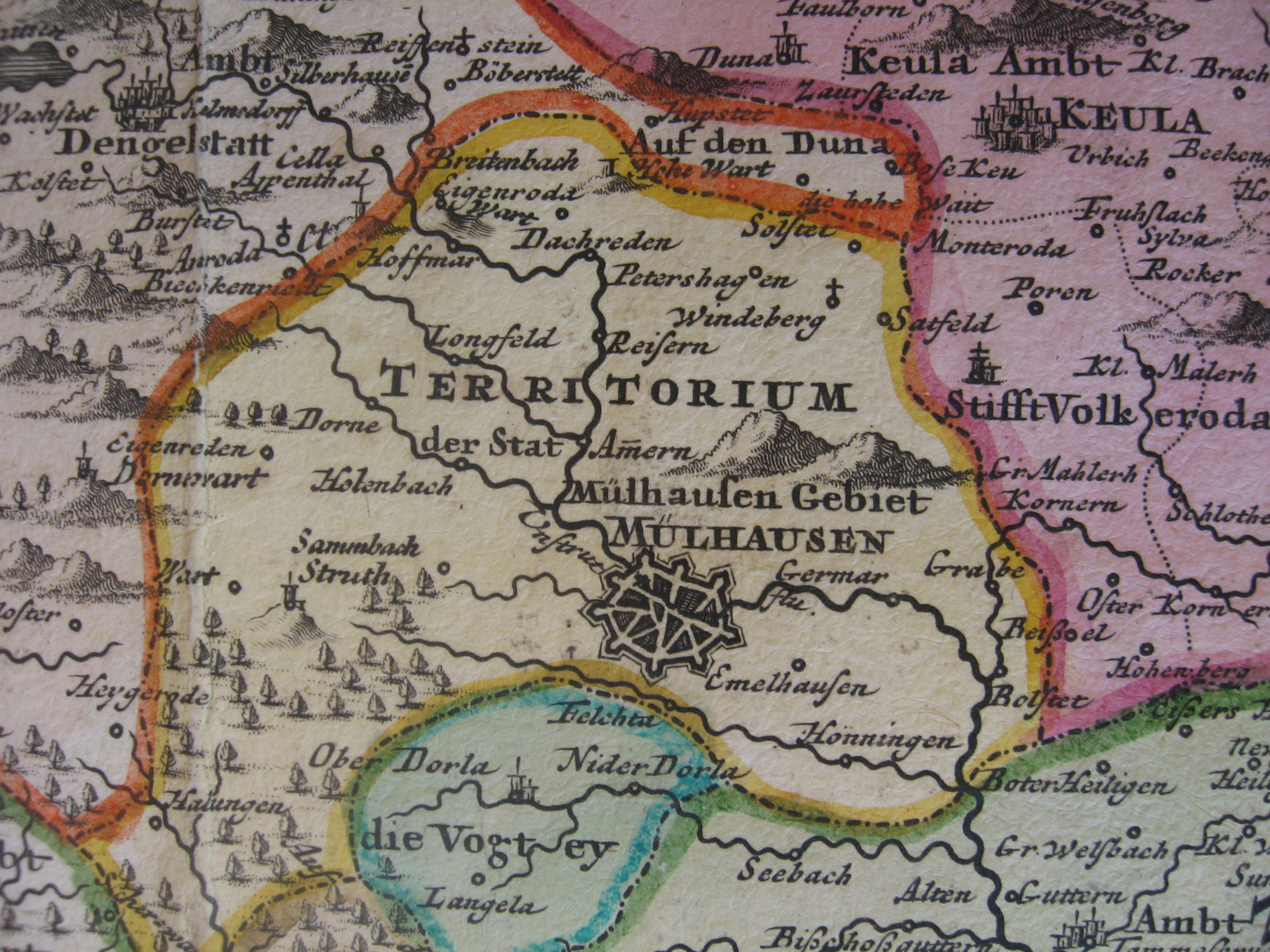
The Mühlhausen territories on a map of 1725

In the mid-13th century, the citizens emancipated more and more from the emperor's rule. For example, Conrad IV had to concede the established wall between the city and the Kaiserpfalz (emperor's court) and later in the 13th century, the citizens destroyed the court. From 1251, Mühlhausen was referred to as a Freie Reichsstadt and became the second most powerful city in Thuringia after Erfurt. The "Mühlhausen Law Book" (1224) is the oldest book of law in the German language and regulated the law of the city. In 1308/09, Mühlhausen allied with Erfurt and Nordhausen against the Wettins, who tried to get these three major Thuringian cities under their rule. The alliance lasted nearly 200 years and was successful. After 1348, Mühlhausen did not have to pay any more taxes to the emperor, so that its independence was complete. The three cities pursued their own territorial policy (e.g. by buying castles) to protect their trade routes against robbery, which brought them constantly into conflict with local nobles. Another aspect of the territorial policy was buying land and villages around the city, making use of any opportunity that presented itself, for example if local rulers (counts, monasteries etc.) needed money. Mühlhausen bought 19 still existing and 43 later abandoned villages and an area of 220 km^{2} (85 sq mi) in this way, covering the north-western part of today's district Unstrut-Hainich-Kreis. The villages had to pay taxes to Mühlhausen and were secured by the Mühlhausen Landwehr, a moat of 24 km (15 mi) length with several towers (Warte) to observe the region.

The economic heyday between the mid-13th and the early 16th century was a result of long-distance trade with textiles, woad and other goods. In 1286, Mühlhausen had joined the Hanseatic League. By the mid-15th century it was one of the largest cities in Germany.

=== Early modern period ===
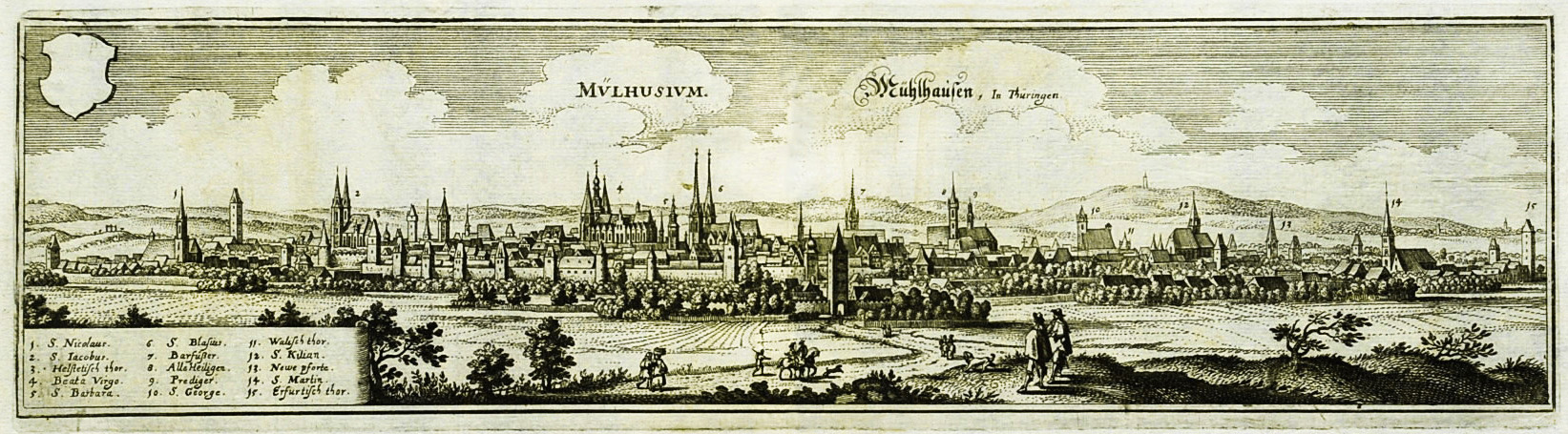
Mühlhausen in 1650

The Reformation brought disturbances to Mühlhausen. The monk and peasant leader Heinrich Pfeiffer from Reifenstein Abbey preached at St. Mary's in February 1523 for the first time, followed by Thomas Müntzer in August 1524. Both had not only religious demands (they were members of the Anabaptist movement) but also political ones, aimed against the privileges of the magistracies and their oligarchic rule over the city. The city council was deposed and replaced by an "Eternal Council" (Ewiger Rat). During the German Peasants' War 1524/25, the city's monasteries were looted and the Bildersturm devastated the churches. After the emperor's army defeated the uprising, Müntzer, Pfeiffer and other leaders were executed. Müntzer's execution on 27 May 1525 took place right outside the city. Furthermore, the city had to pay a fine of 40,000 guilders to the empire and partially lost its independence, because the Hessians and both lines of the Wettins (Ernestines and Albertines) were appointed to control the city government. By contrast to these three rulers, Mühlhausen remained Catholic and became a secret member of the Nuremberg League, an alliance of Catholic territories in the empire, founded in 1538. After the three rulers realized that in 1542, the Reformation was introduced by force in Mühlhausen by Justus Menius. The Schmalkaldic War resulted in the defeat of the Hessians and the Ernestines by the emperor in 1547 and partially returned the city's independence. In foreign policy it had to coordinate with the Albertines and it had to pay taxes to the empire. After 1710, Hanover was Mühlhausen's protecting power.

Johann Sebastian Bach was organist of the church Divi Blasii from 1707 until 1708. Among the works Bach composed while living in the town was an elaborate, festive cantata, Gott ist mein König, BWV 71, for the inauguration of the new council in 1708.

Internal dissensions and destruction caused during the Thirty Years' War (1618–1648) and the Seven Years' War (1756–1763) helped in bringing about Mühlhausen's decline. In addition, Leipzig's rise as a trade fair town and new long-distance trading routes like Via Regia also contributed by decreasing the city's trade and damaging the finances of the city. The German mediatization led to the formal loss (that had de facto already occurred) of Mühlhausen's independence in 1803, as the city became part of Prussia. During the Napoleonic Wars it was part of the Kingdom of Westphalia from 1807 until 1815, when it became part of Prussia again according to the decisions of the Congress of Vienna.

=== Since 1815 ===
After 1815, Mühlhausen was part of the newly created Prussian Province of Saxony, where the Mühlhausen district was established. In 1831, the Mühlhausen-born civil engineer John A. Roebling, later constructor of the Brooklyn Bridge, emigrated to the United States. The era of industrialisation and urbanisation reached Mühlhausen relatively late, around 1870, when the city was connected to the railway by a line from Gotha to Leinefelde. In 1892, Mühlhausen became an independent city district. In 1898, the municipal power station was founded and the tramway network started its operation in Mühlhausen. Major industries were textiles and engineering.

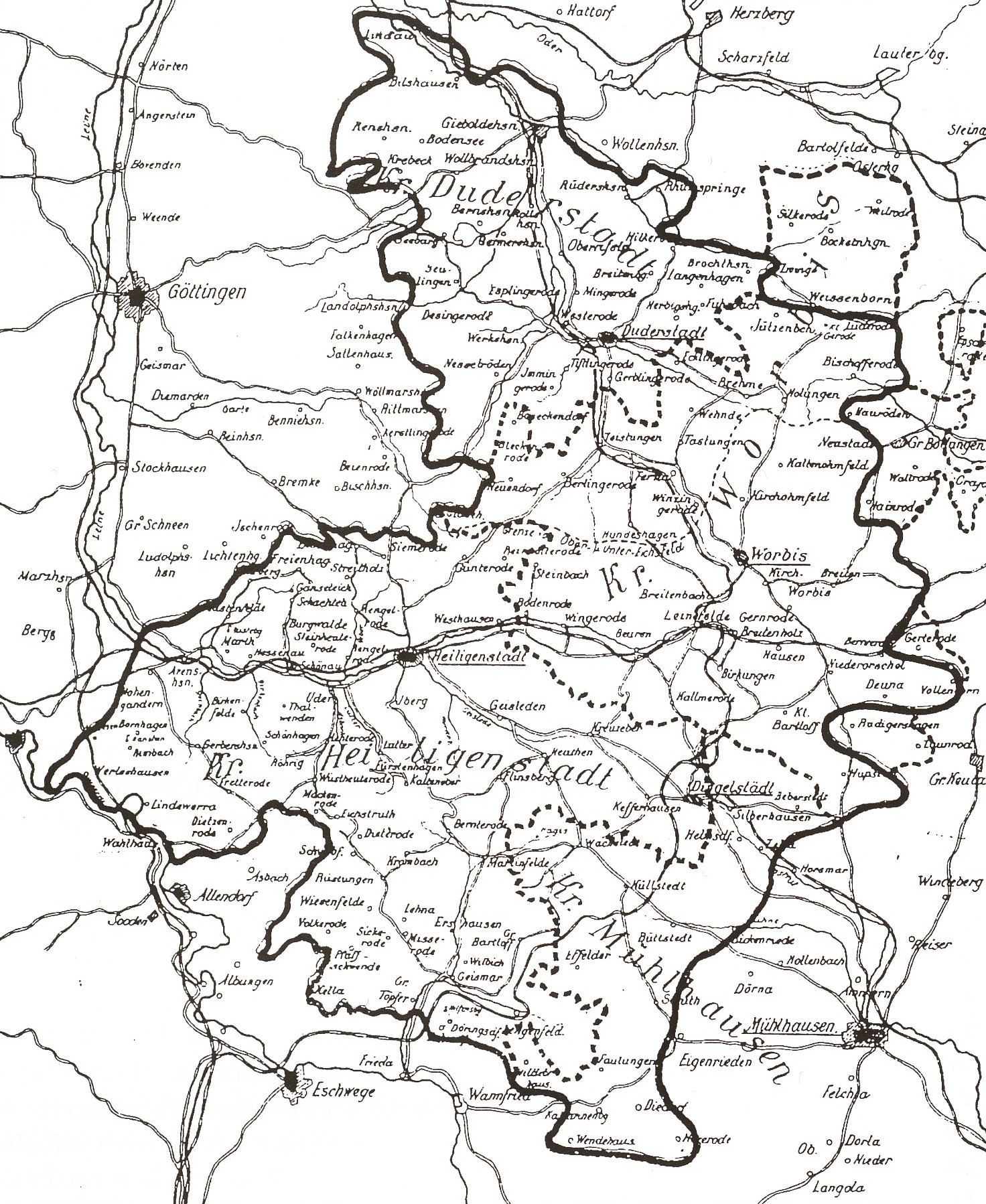
The Eichsfeld in 1900

Between 1910 and 1917, the provincial hospital of Pfafferode was built on the western edge of the city, one of the largest hospitals in the Prussian Province of Saxony. The Great Depression after 1929 hit Mühlhausen very hard and led to massive unemployment. In 1935, the Nazi armament campaign resulted in the building of a large military complex with several barracks with the deliberate side effect of boosting the city's weak economy. The synagogue was damaged during the Kristallnacht in November 1938, but as one of only a few in Germany, it was not completely destroyed and still stands today. At the Pfafferode hospital, nearly 2,000 patients were killed or died during the Nazi period (Action T4), most of them were mentally or physically disabled. From 1944 to March 1945, a women's forced labour camp was located directly outside Mühlhausen (a branch of the Buchenwald camp), producing arms. The women were deported in April 1945 to Bergen-Belsen concentration camp. The US Army arrived in Mühlhausen on 4 April 1945 and the city was handed over without a fight. On 5 July 1945, the Soviet Army took over the city, which became part of the GDR in 1949.

In 1975, the 450th obit of Thomas Müntzer, the city was officially renamed Thomas-Müntzer-Stadt Mühlhausen. Müntzer and the German Peasants' War received a lot of attention from the GDR government and East-German historians; they referred to it as Frühbürgerliche Revolution (early bourgeois revolution) and included it in their Marxist conception of history. Many exhibitions were set up (including some of the museums in Mühlhausen and the Bauernkriegspanorama near Bad Frankenhausen) and events celebrating the historical connection took place. After German reunification, the focus on Müntzer and the Peasants' War ended. The city name was changed back to plain "Mühlhausen" in 1991.

After reunification, many factories in Mühlhausen were closed, leading to another deep economic crisis with high unemployment rates during the 1990s and early 2000s. On the other hand, the city's architectural heritage was rediscovered and the restoration of the historic city centre began.

== Geography and demographics ==
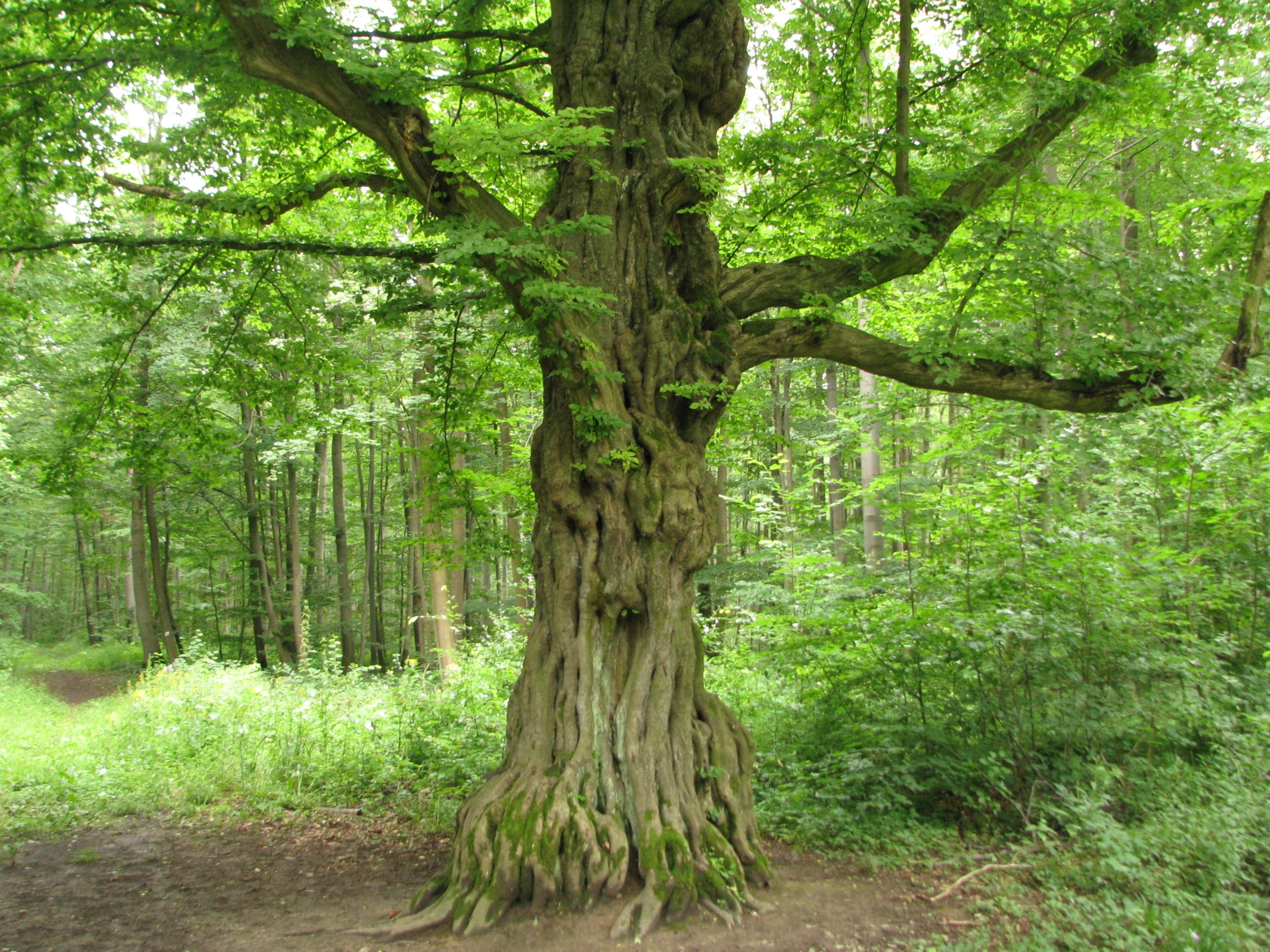
An old hornbeam at Stadtwald

=== Topography ===
Mühlhausen is situated in the flat landscape of the Thuringian Basin, a very fertile area covering the northern centre of Thuringia at an elevation of approximately 215 metres above sea level. To the north and west, the terrain gets hilly, whereas to the south and east lie wide agricultural areas, much like most of the municipal territory itself. Furthermore, there are two forests within the territory: the Stadtwald (as part of the Hainich) in the west and the Mühlhäuser Hardt between the Windeberg district and Menteroda. Both are broadleaf forests with beeches prevalent. The Hainich hills south-west of Mühlhausen became Thuringia's only National Park in 1997 because of their old near-natural beech forests. The highest hills within the Mühlhausen terrain reach approximately 400 metres of elevation. The main river crossing the city in northwest–southeast direction is the Unstrut. Furthermore, there are many small tributaries running from the western hills through Mühlhausen to the Unstrut like the Schwemmnotte, which is dividing the inner city.

Germany's accurate geographical centre is located only 5 km (3 mi) south of the city in the neighbouring municipality of Niederdorla, where a monument can be found at this spot.

=== Climate ===
The average annual temperature in Mühlhausen is 8.7 °C (47.7 °F).

With an annual precipitation of only 565 millimeters (22.2 in), the climate in Mühlhausen is relatively dry, compared to other regions in Germany.

=== Administrative division ===
Mühlhausen abuts the following municipalities (all of them are part of the Unstrut-Hainich-Kreis): Anrode, Unstruttal and Menteroda in the north, Obermehler and Körner in the east, Vogtei in the south and Rodeberg in the west. In the direction of Ammern (part of Unstruttal) there is no interruption in the build-up area, the Ruhrstraße forms an urban municipal border here.

The city itself (in addition to the core town) includes the following villages (population as of March 2021):

Village	Population	Incorporated in
Bollstedt	1,001	2019
Eigenrieden	c. 500	2024
Felchta	626	1994
Görmar	943	1994
Grabe	645	2019
Hollenbach	310	2023
Höngeda	723	2019
Saalfeld	162	1994
Seebach	655	2019
Windeberg	237	1992

The former municipality Weinbergen which consisted of the villages Bollstedt, Grabe, Höngeda, and Seebach was merged into Mühlhausen in January 2019. In January 2023 Mühlhausen absorbed the village Hollenbach from the former municipality Anrode. In January 2024 it absorbed the village Eigenrieden from the former municipality Rodeberg.

=== Demographics ===
Mühlhausen had approximately 10,000 inhabitants during the late Middle Ages around 1500, which made it the second-largest number within today's Thuringia, after Erfurt, the current capital. The early modern period brought stagnation to the city, so that the population was still 10,000 around 1800. Mühlhausen fell back behind the new ducal residence cities like Weimar, Gotha or Altenburg in this period and lost its former importance. Furthermore, the traffic routes changed during the 19th century and Mühlhausen lost its good connections. Industrialization started later than in other German cities. Nevertheless, the population grew to 14,000 in 1850, 23,000 in 1880 and 35,000 in 1910, which was a significantly lower rate of growth than in other cities of comparable size during that period of rapid urbanisation in Germany. By 1940, the population had increased to 42,000 and with German refugees from eastern Europe, the peak was reached around 1950 with a population of 52,000. Since that time, the population has decreased to 43,000 in 1988, 39,000 in 2000 and 33,000 in 2012 (the statistical adjustment during the 2011 Census led to a loss of 3,000 persons).

The average decline in population between 2009 and 2012 was approximately 0.38% p.a, whereas the population in bordering rural regions has been shrinking with accelerating tendency. Suburbanization played only a small role in Mühlhausen. It occurred after the reunification for a short time in the 1990s, but most of the suburban areas were situated within the administrative city borders, others were Unstruttal and Weinbergen.

The birth deficit was 203 in 2012, this is −6.1 per 1,000 inhabitants (Thuringian average: -4.5; national average: -2.4). The net migration rate was +1.2 per 1,000 inhabitants in 2012 (Thuringian average: -0.8; national average: +4.6). The most important regions of origin of Mühlhausen migrants are rural areas of Thuringia as well as foreign countries like Poland, Russia, Ukraine, Hungary, Serbia, Romania and Bulgaria.

Like other eastern German cities, foreigners account for only a small share of Mühlhausen's population: circa 1.6% are non-Germans by citizenship and 4.2% overall are classified as migrants (according to the 2011 EU census). Differing from the national average, the largest groups of migrants in Mühlhausen are Russians and Ukrainians.

Due to the official atheism of the former GDR, most of the population is non-religious. 19.8% are members of the Evangelical Church in Central Germany and 10.3% are Catholics (according to the 2011 EU census).

== Culture, sights and cityscape ==
=== Museums ===
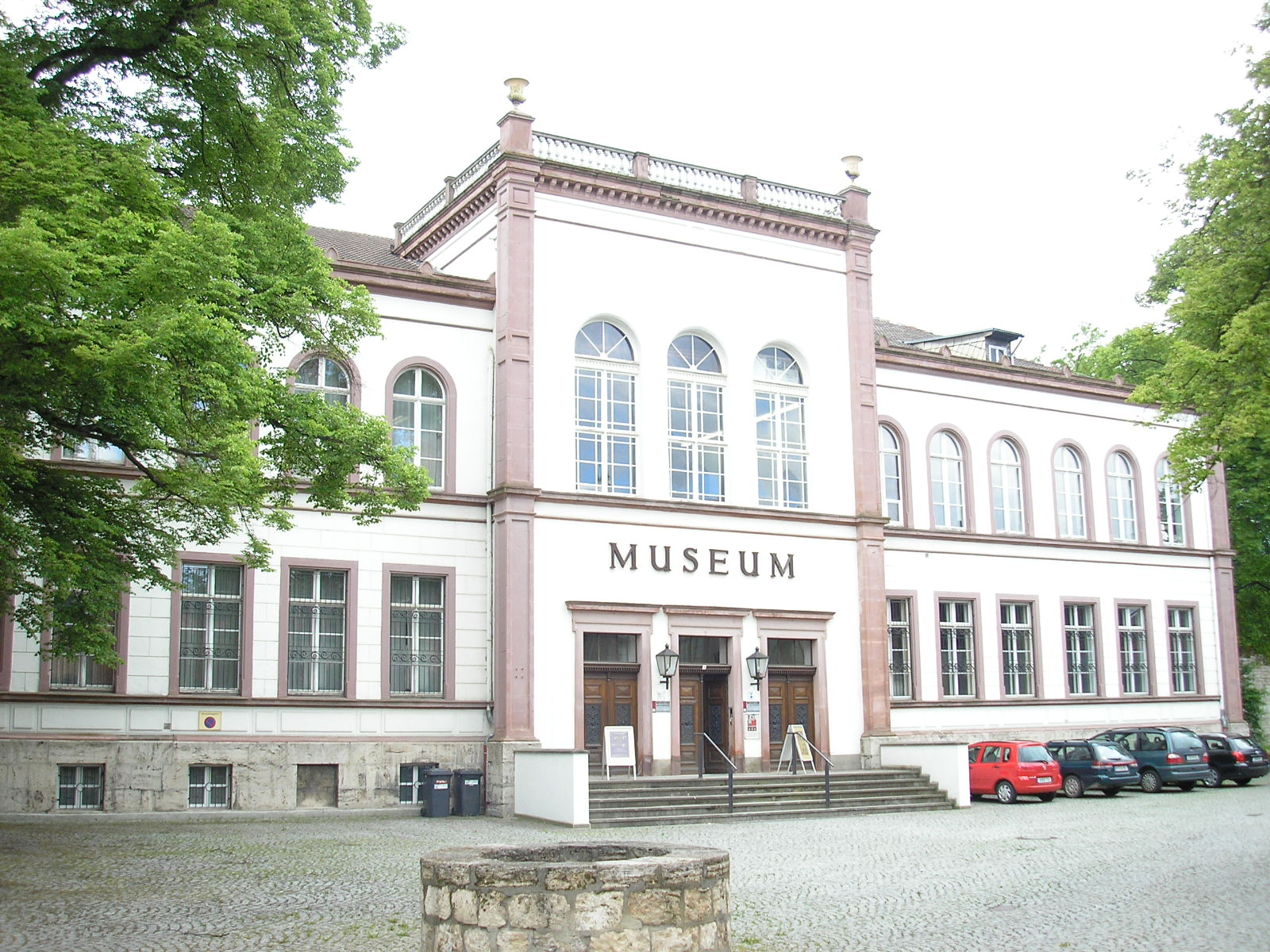
Municipal museum at Lindenbühl

There are several museums in Mühlhausen:

- The Müntzergedenkstätte inside St. Mary's Church was opened in 1975 and shows an exhibition about Thomas Müntzer and various other items of cultural history.
- The Bauernkriegsmuseum inside the Corn Market Church shows an exhibition about the Bauernkrieg (German Peasants' War) and its importance for German history.
- The Museumsgalerie inside the All Saints Church hosts some art exhibitions: a permanent one with Thuringian art of different epoques and temporary ones of modern art.
- The Museum am Lindenbühl exhibits the municipal history of Mühlhausen and the regional history of north-western Thuringia including natural history and archaeology.
- The Wehrgang is part of the medieval city wall, accessible next to the Frauentor gate. It gives access to a large stretch of the city walls and the towers.
- The 1st German Bratwurst Museum was reopened in Mühlhausen on 16 August 2023 after moving from Holzhausen.

=== Cityscape ===
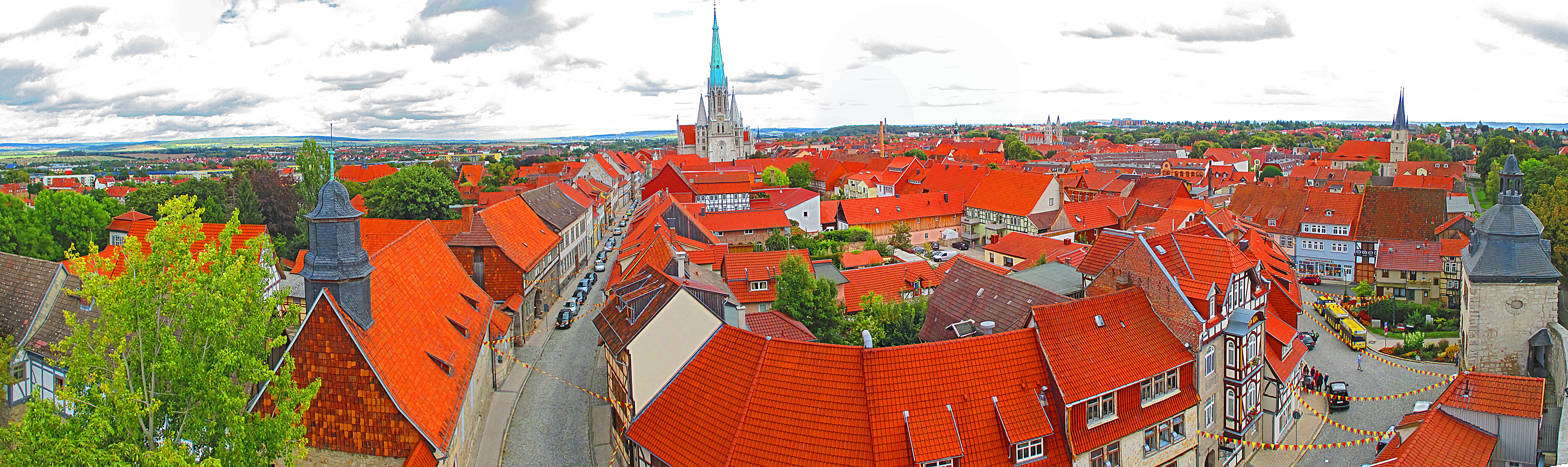
The city's skyline is dominated by St. Mary's steeple, the highest one in Thuringia.

The historic city centre of Mühlhausen consists of three parts. Within the inner city wall are the old town (south of Schwemmnotte river around Untermarkt and St. Blaise's Church) and the new town (north of Schwemmnotte river around Obermarkt and St. Mary's Church). The former suburbiums of Mühlhausen are situated between the inner and the outer city walls. Like the inner city, they are of medieval origin, but in contrast from the core, this area was overbuilt often during the city's later history and today shows a mixture of old and new buildings. Within the inner city walls, most buildings date back to the Middle Ages. In the late 19th and the 20th century, the city grew into all directions and a relatively low density of buildings is typical for Mühlhausen, so that the built-up area is very large in relation to the number of inhabitants.

Characteristic for Mühlhausen's buildings is the predominant use of one kind of material – Travertine. It was found near the city in large quantities and is both light and solid, so that the Gothic churches with their filigree masonries and other important buildings could be built relatively cheaply. Nevertheless, many older citizens' houses were half-timbered constructions, with only the ground-floors made of stone.

=== Sights and architectural heritage ===
==== Churches and synagogue ====
Mühlhausen is primarily known for its large number of intact Gothic churches:

===== Inside the inner city walls =====
- St. Blaise's Church is the main church of the medieval Old Town at Untermarkt. It was built during the 13th century in early-Gothic style and is one of the most important 13th-century church buildings in Germany. It was first mentioned in 1227. The Teutonic Knights, owners of the church, had it expanded after 1270 using architects/builders from Maulbronn and Walkenried. Johann Sebastian Bach worked here in 1707–1708 as organist. Today, it is the main Lutheran parish church of Mühlhausen.
- St. Mary's Church is the main church of the medieval New Town at Obermarkt. It was built in the early 14th century in high-Gothic style and is Thuringia's second-largest church after Erfurt Cathedral, sporting Thuringia's highest steeple (86 metres (282 ft)). In 1975, the church was deconsecrated and is used as a museum today.
- All Saints Church at Steinweg was built in the late 13th century and has been a museum since 1989.
- St. Anthony's Chapel at Holzstraße was built in the 13th century and is a hostel today.
- Corn Market Church at Kornmarkt was built as a Franciscanian monastery c. 1250. The monastery was abandoned in 1568. In 1702–22 the church was redesigned in the baroque style. The last service was held here in 1802 after which the church became a warehouse. Since 1975 it has been used as a museum.
- St. James's Church at Jakobistraße was built in the 14th century and hosts the city library today.
- St. Kilian's Church at Kiliansgraben was built during the 14th/15th century and hosts a theatre today.
- St. Peter and Paul's Church between Steinweg and Mönchgasse was the church of the Dominican monastery, built in the early 14th century and demolished after a fire in 1689. Today, there are only a few walls remaining.
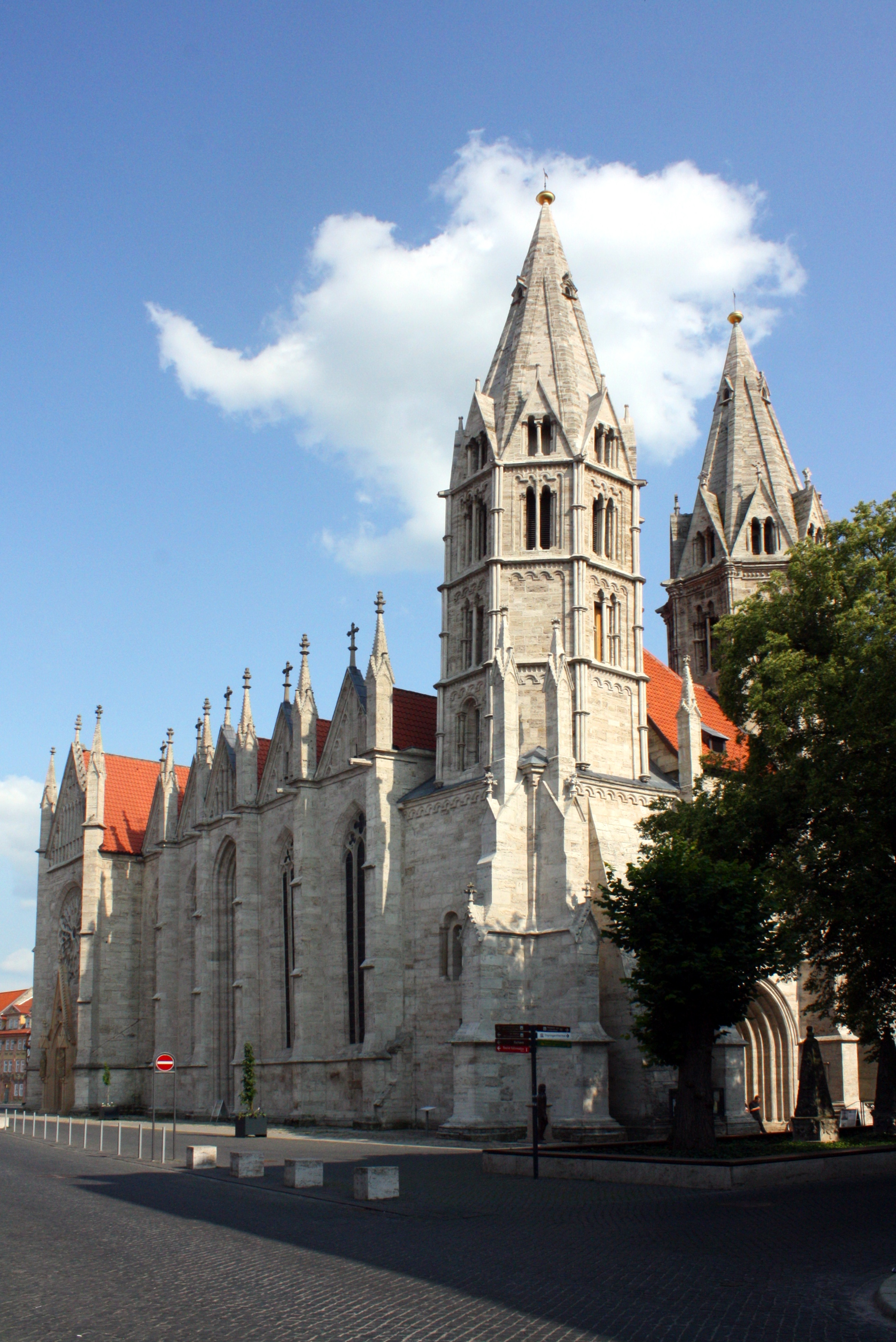
St. Blaise's Church

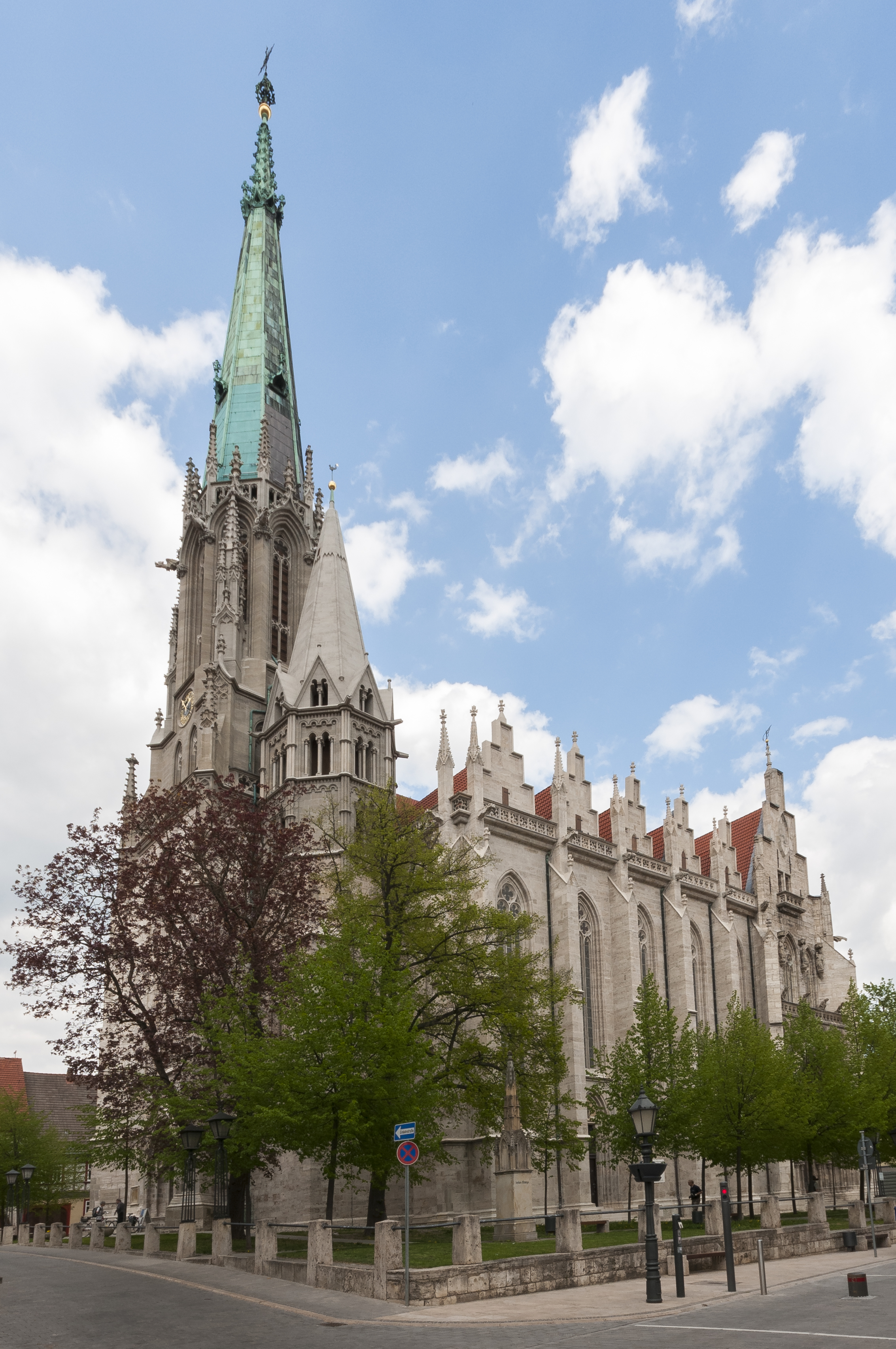
St. Mary's Church

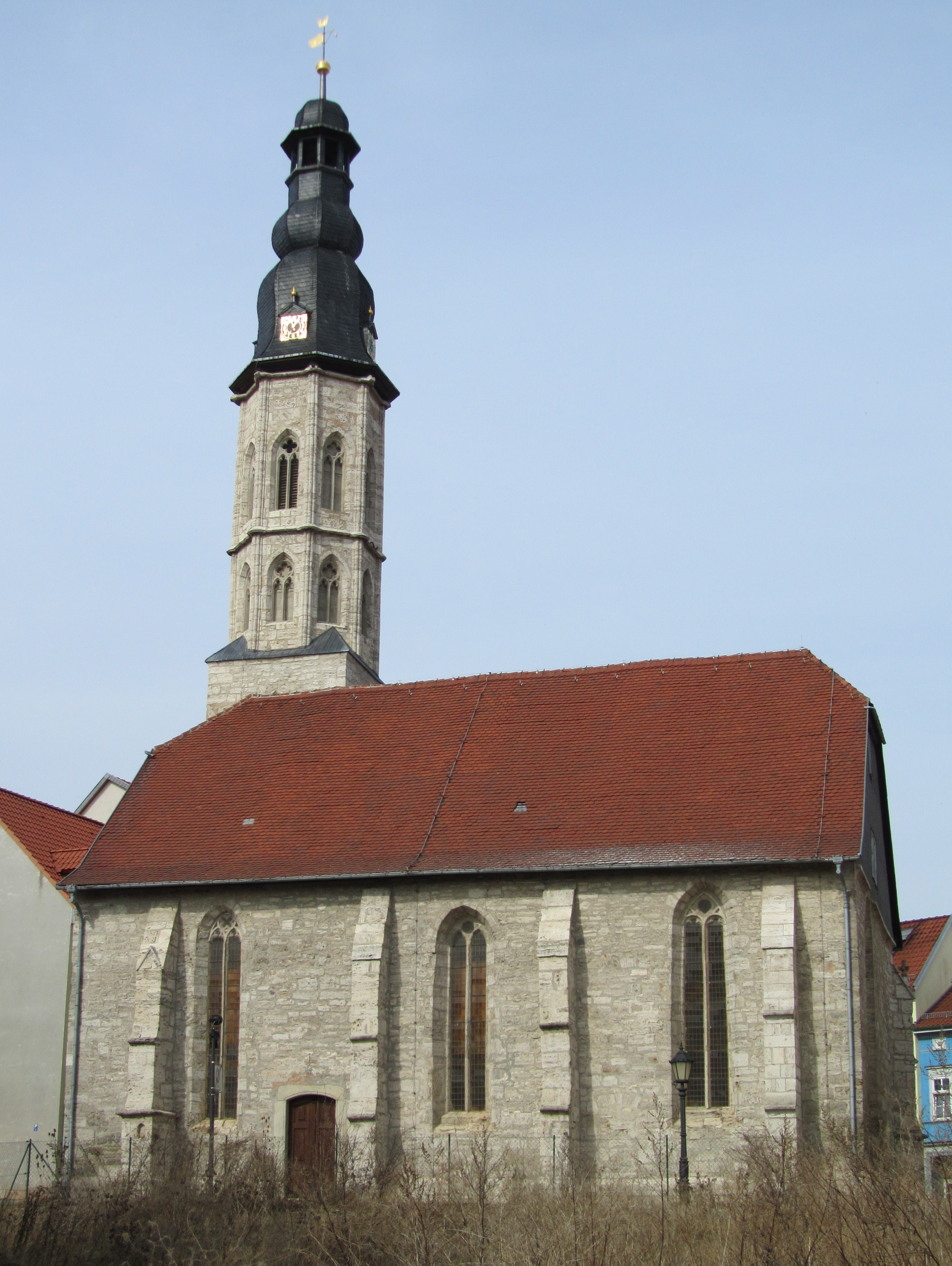
All Saints Church

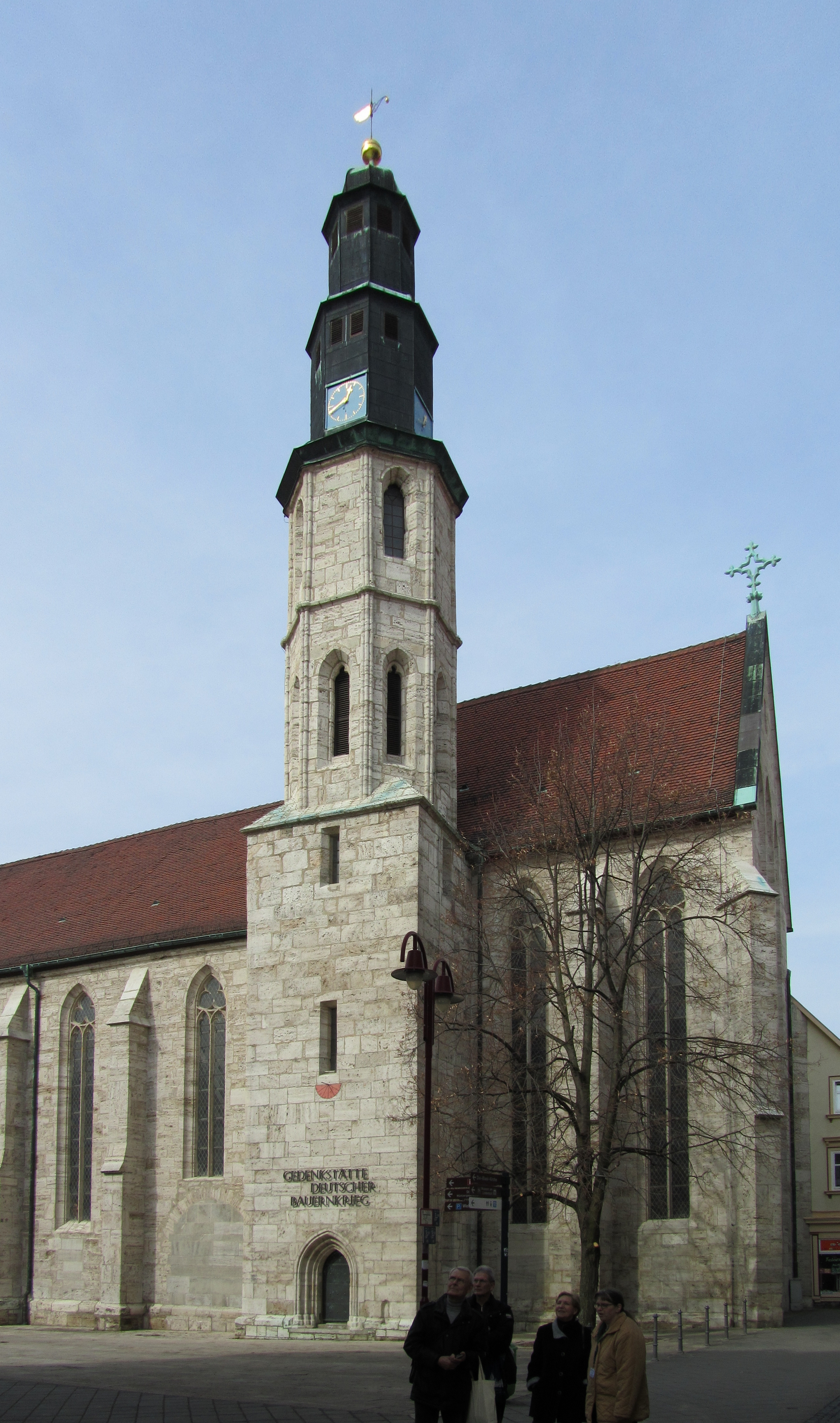
Corn Market Church

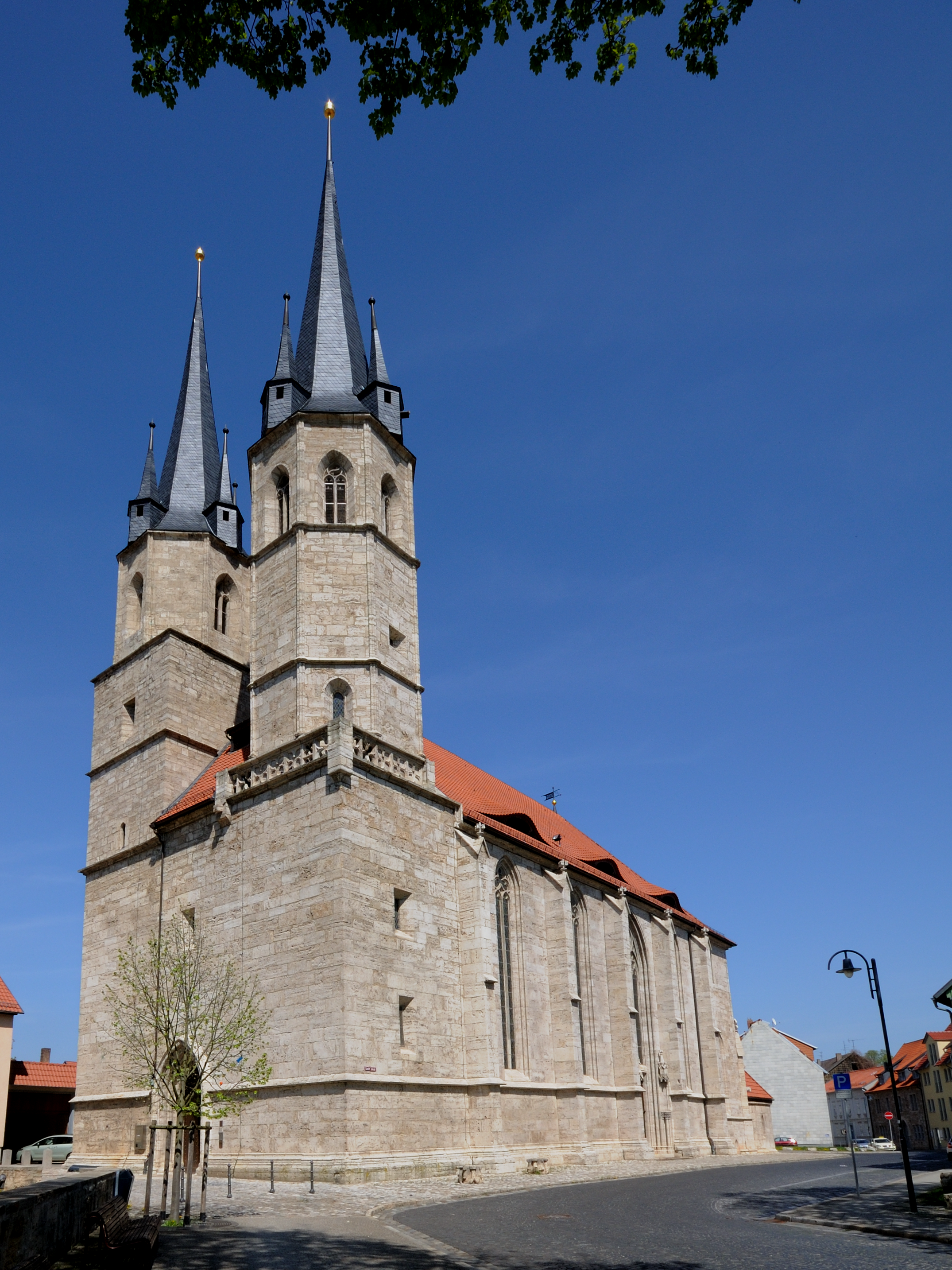
St. James's Church

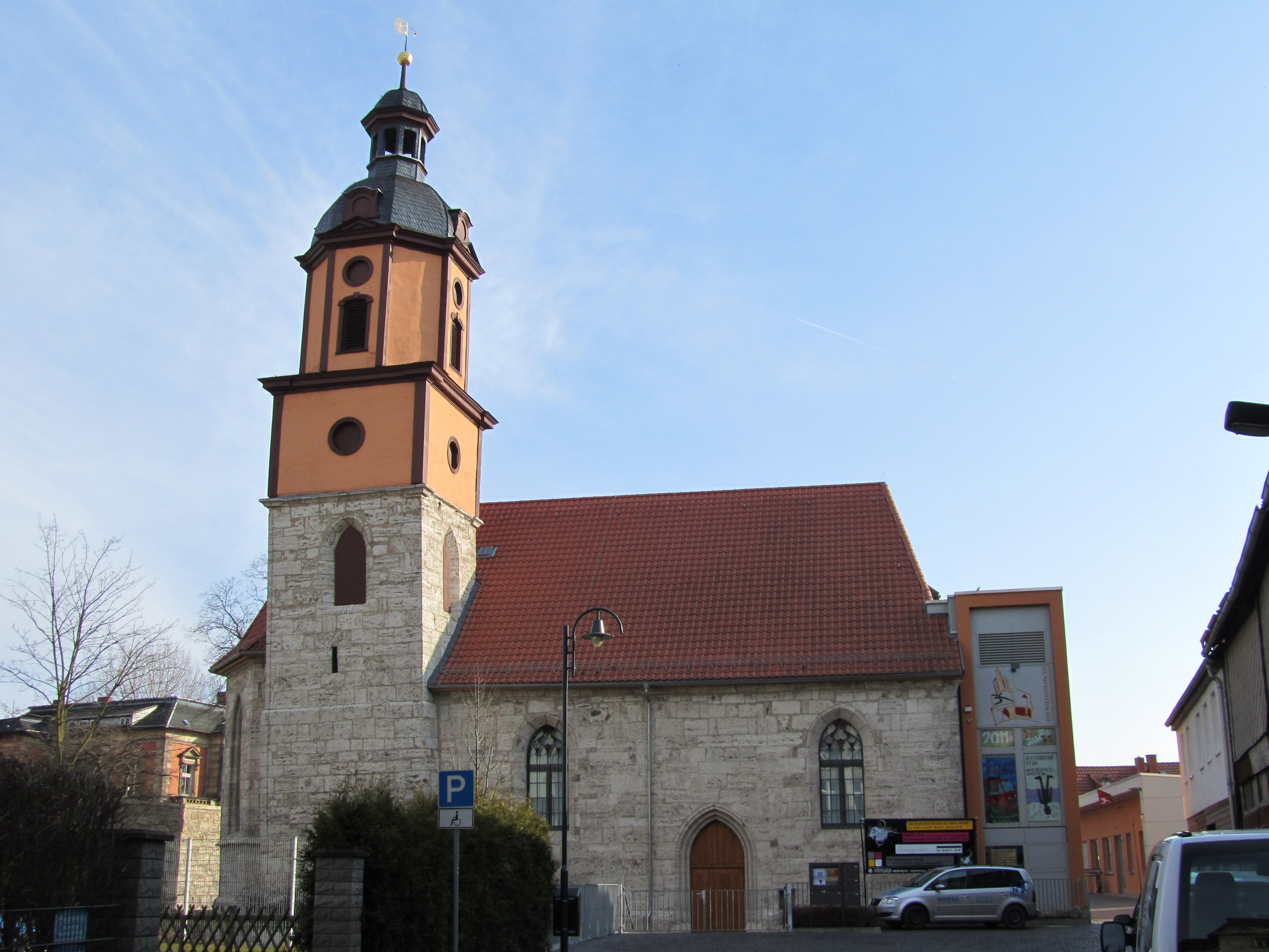
St. Kilian's Church

===== Outside the inner city walls =====
- St. George's Church at Sondershäuser Straße was built in the 14th century and is a Protestant parish church today.
- St. Martin's Church at Kiliansgraben was built in the 14th century and is a Protestant parish church today.
- St. Nicholas' Church at Bastmarkt is a Protestant parish church and was built in the early 14th century in Gothic style as the largest church outside the inner city walls.
- St. Peter's Church at Petristeinweg was built between 1352 and 1356 and is a Protestant parish church today.
- St. Boniface's Church at Blobach was built in 1851 in Gothic Revival style and hosts a Catholic kindergarten today.
- St. Joseph's Church at Karl-Marx-Straße was built in 1903/04 in Gothic Revival style. Today, it is the Catholic parish church.
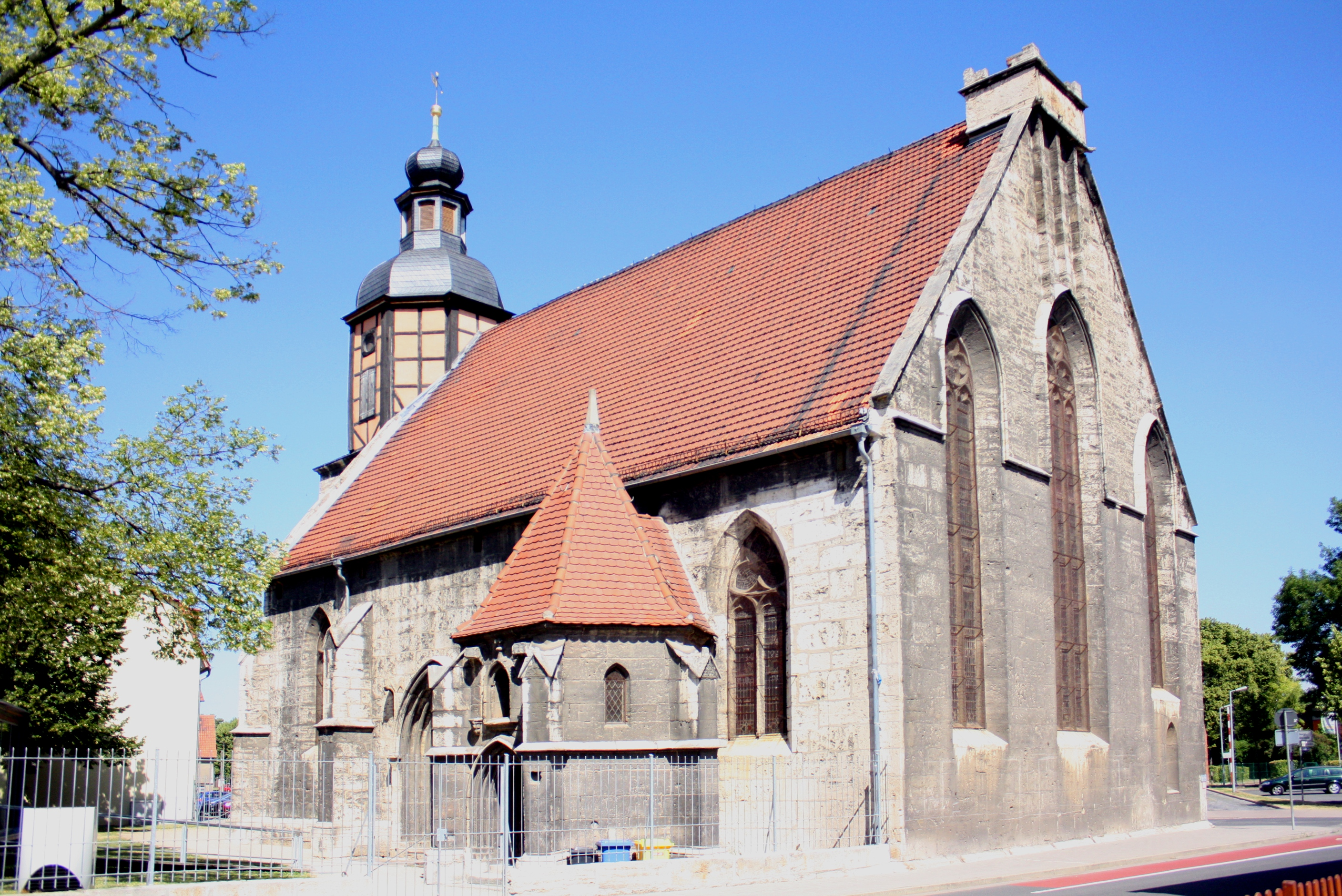
St. George's Church

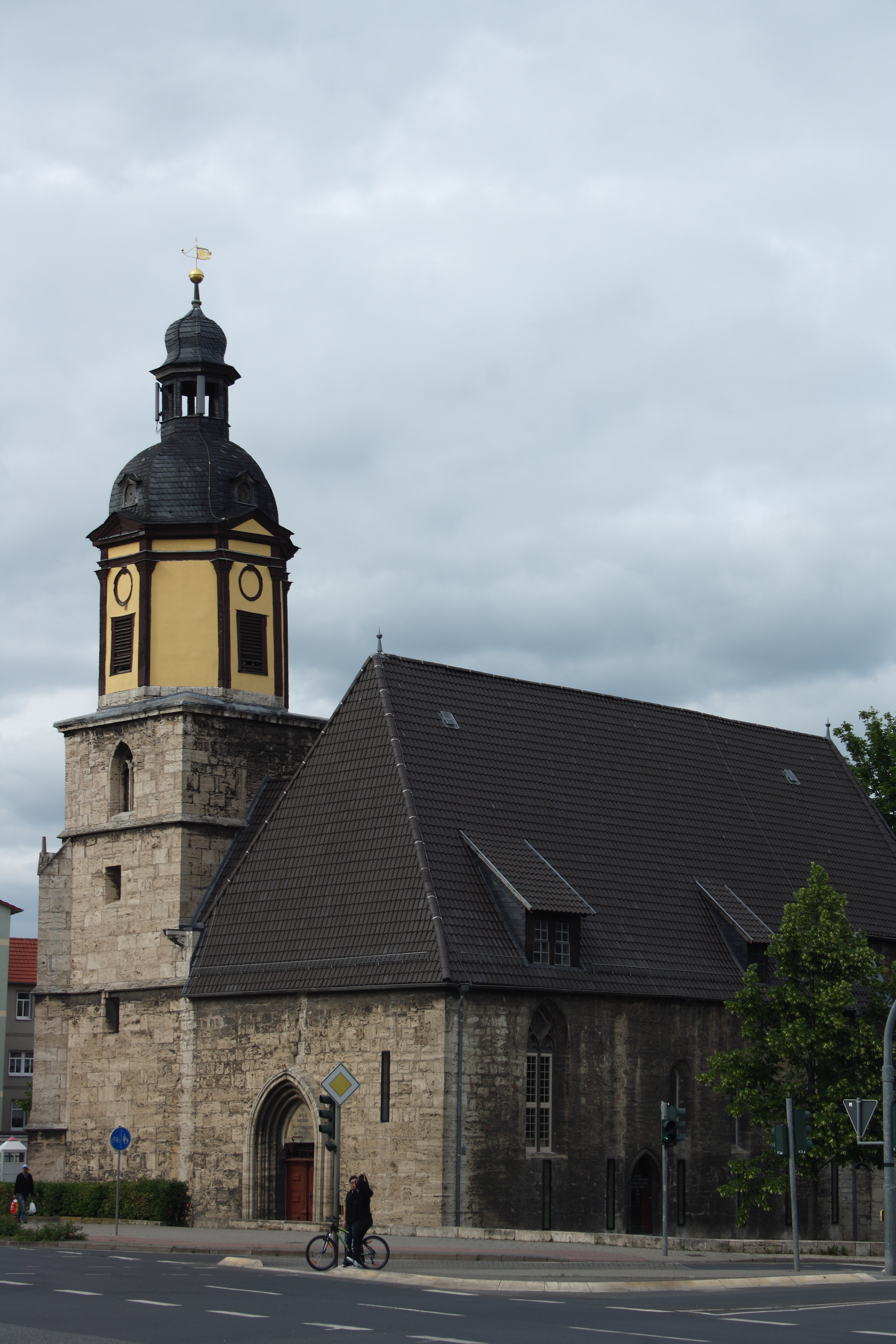
St. Martin's Church

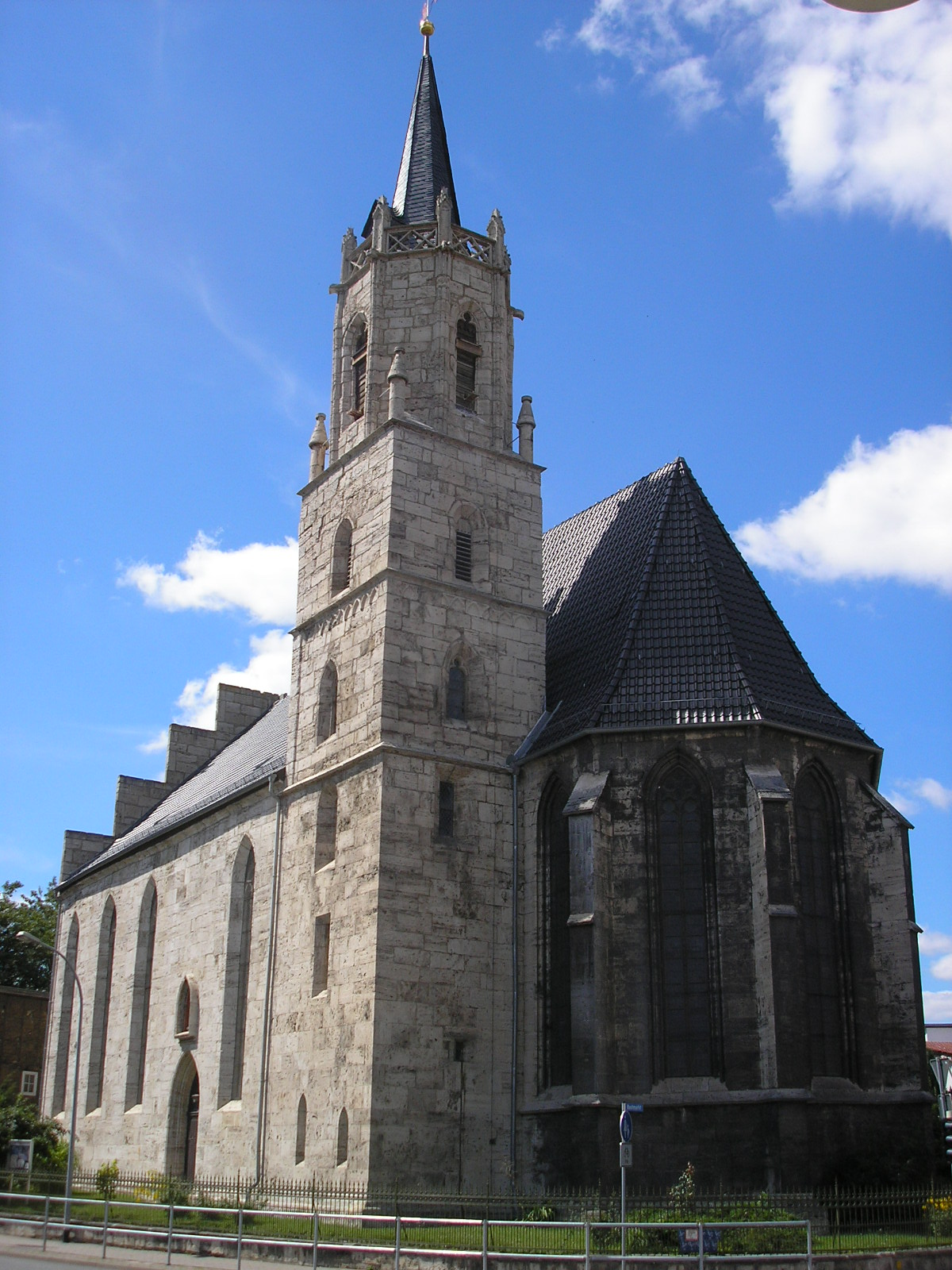
St. Nicholas' Church

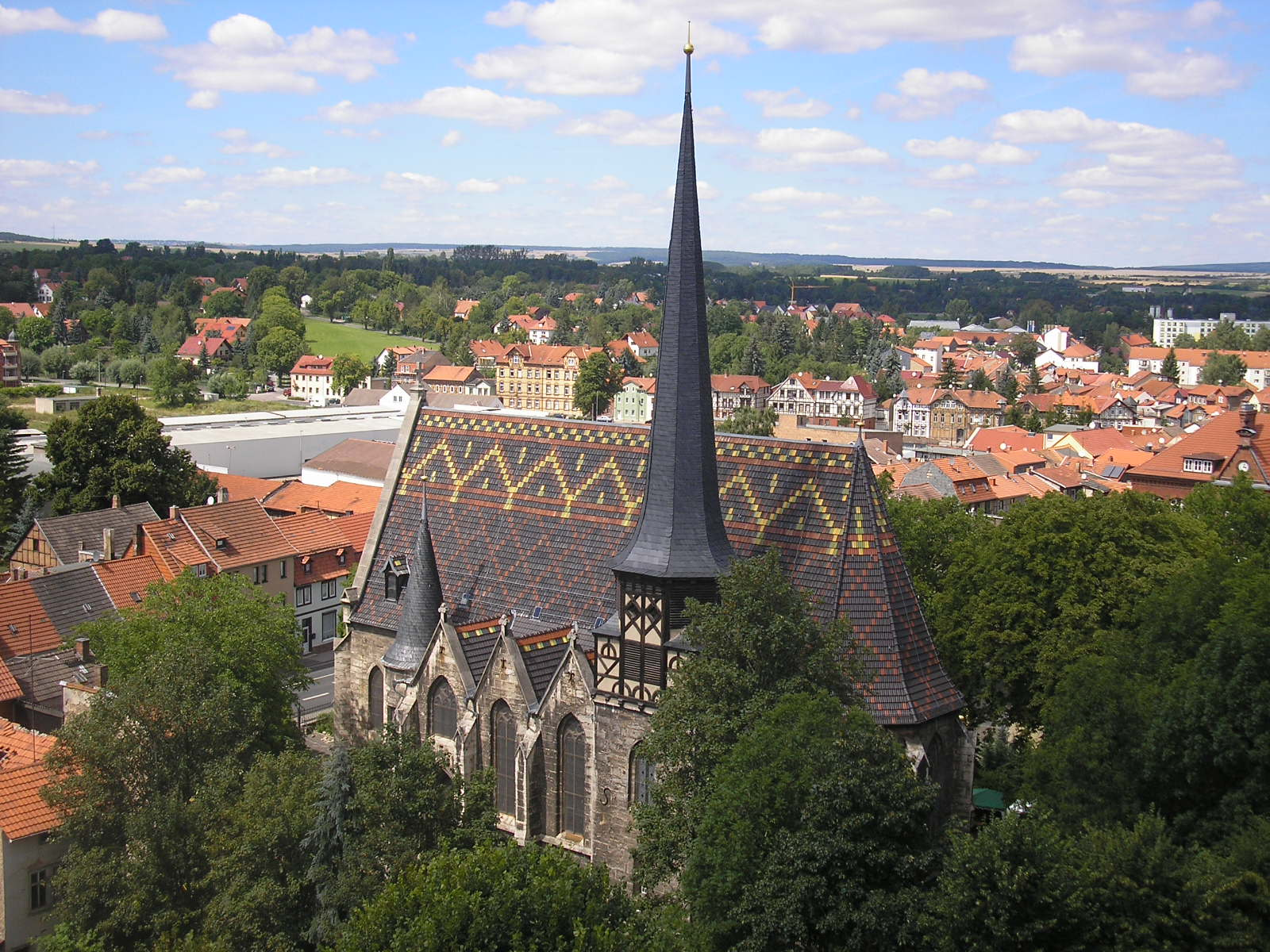
St. Peter's Church

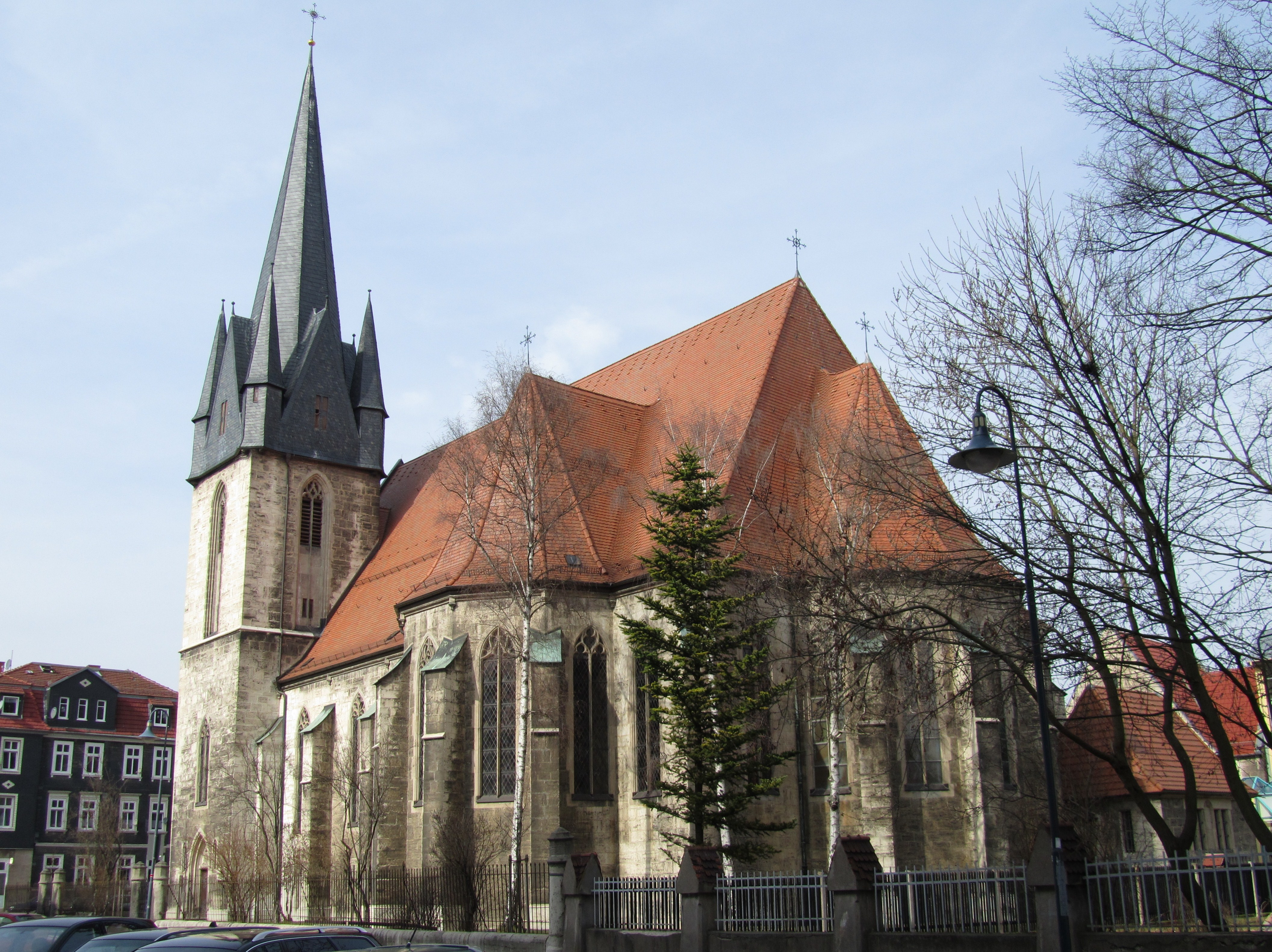
St. Joseph's Church

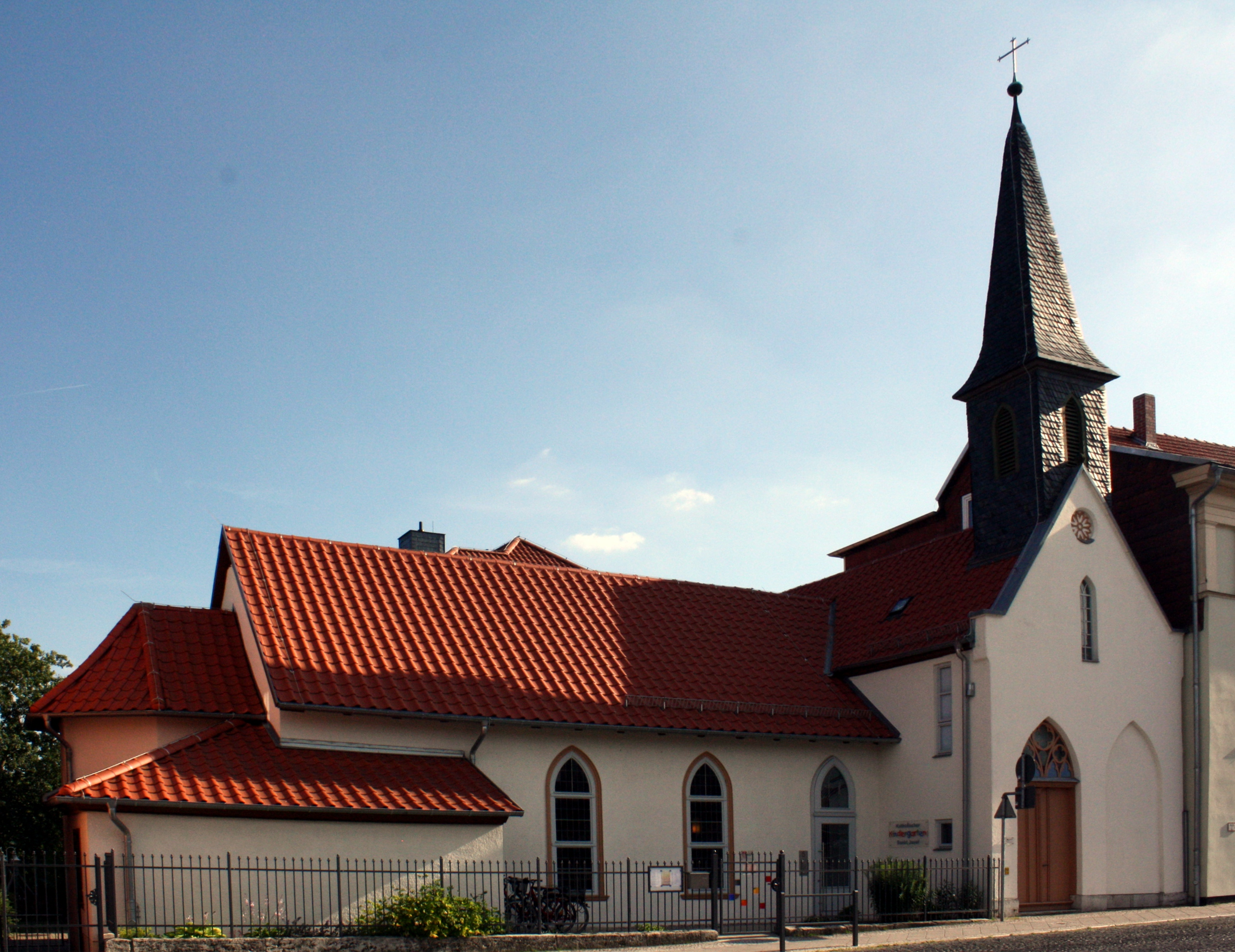
St. Boniface's Church

===== Synagogue =====
The Mühlhausen Synagogue at Jüdenstraße was first mentioned in 1380. Today's building is of younger origin: it was established in 1840/41 after the emancipation of the Jews in Prussia. The Synagogue was damaged during the pogrom of Kristallnacht in 1938, but it was one of only a few in Germany that survived the Nazi period and World War II. In 1998, it was reconsecrated and it is in use by the Jewish Community of Thuringia. It is also open for visitors.

==== Secular buildings ====
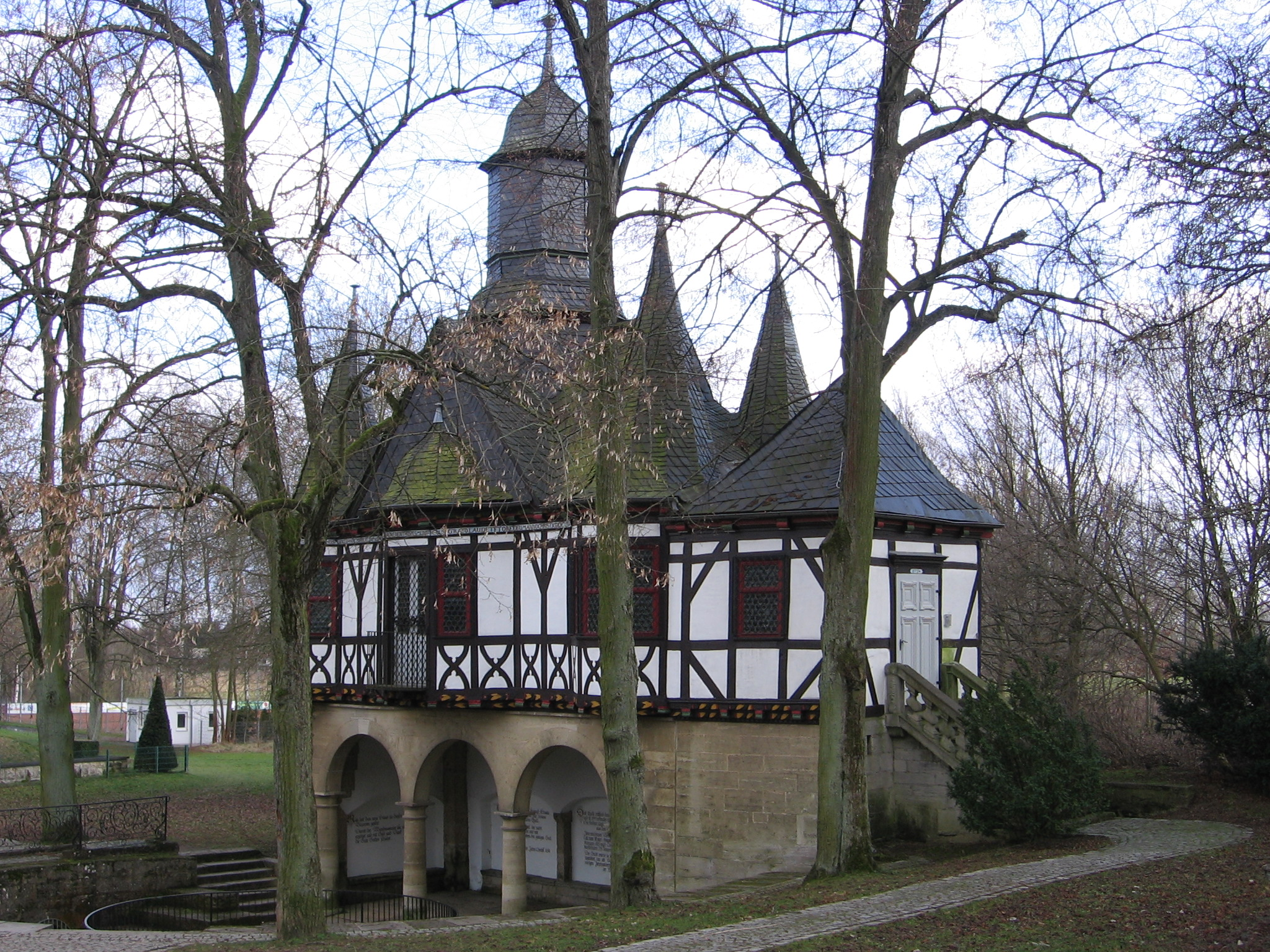
Popperode well house

- The inner city walls were built during the 12th century with a length of 2.7 kilometres (1.7 mi), a height of 8 metres (26 ft) and a thickness of 1.75 metres (5.7 ft). They are mostly intact, with the exception of most of the gates, laid down during the 19th century to improve traffic access. The only existing gates are the Frauentor in the west (inner and outer one), out of an original total of 23 gates. Next to the inner Frauentor stands the Rabenturm, which is accessible via the Wehrgang-Museum.
- The Rathaus (town hall) at Ratsstraße is unusual, because it is not located in a square, not even on a main street but more inside a city block. It stretches across Ratsstraße with an arch. It was built after 1310 and several times expanded on until 1596.
- The Brotlaube (bread storage) is a large building at Obermarkt, first mentioned in 1304 and rebuilt after a fire in 1689. It was the market hall of the bakers. The façade mainly dates to 1722.
- The Order of the Teutonic Knights had two courts in Mühlhausen. The one in the old town at Untermarkt was rebuilt in 1720 and hosts the superintendenture today. The one in the new town next to St. Mary's Church was rebuilt during the 16th century. It was the residence of Thomas Müntzer and later the birthplace of Friedrich August Stüler.
- The Pfafferode Hospital is a large hospital complex within a park, built between 1910 and 1917 at the western edge of the city and is a typical example of the early-20th-century sanatorium architecture in Germany.
- The Brunnenhaus Popperode is a small Renaissance building in the south-western periphery of Mühlhausen, built in 1614. The well was first mentioned in 1199 as part of the medieval city's water supply.
- There are also many architecturally interesting citizens' and patricians' houses within the centre of Mühlhausen, especially along the Steinweg street and at the Untermarkt square.
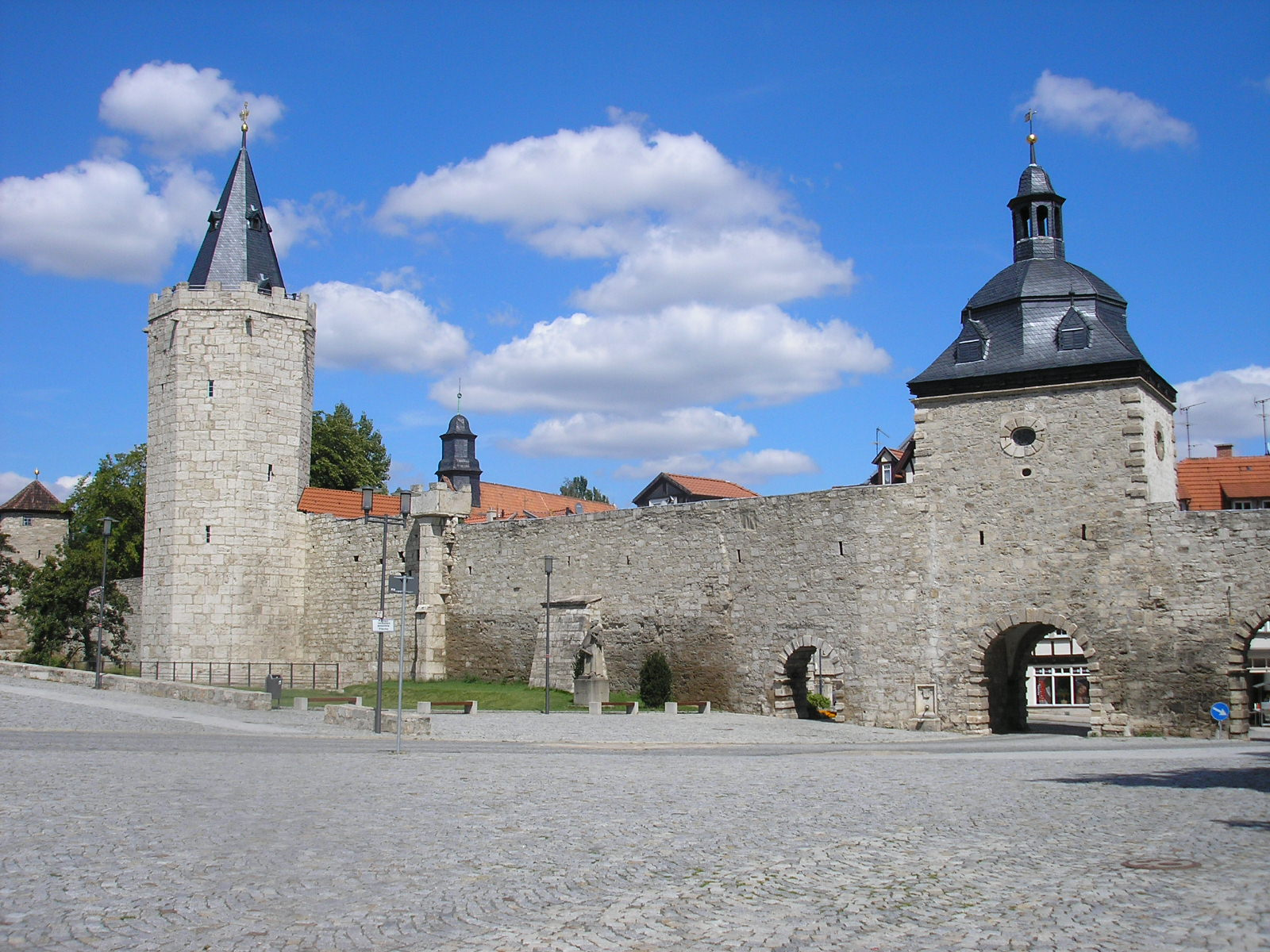
Inner city walls with the Frauentor on the right and the Rabenturm on the left

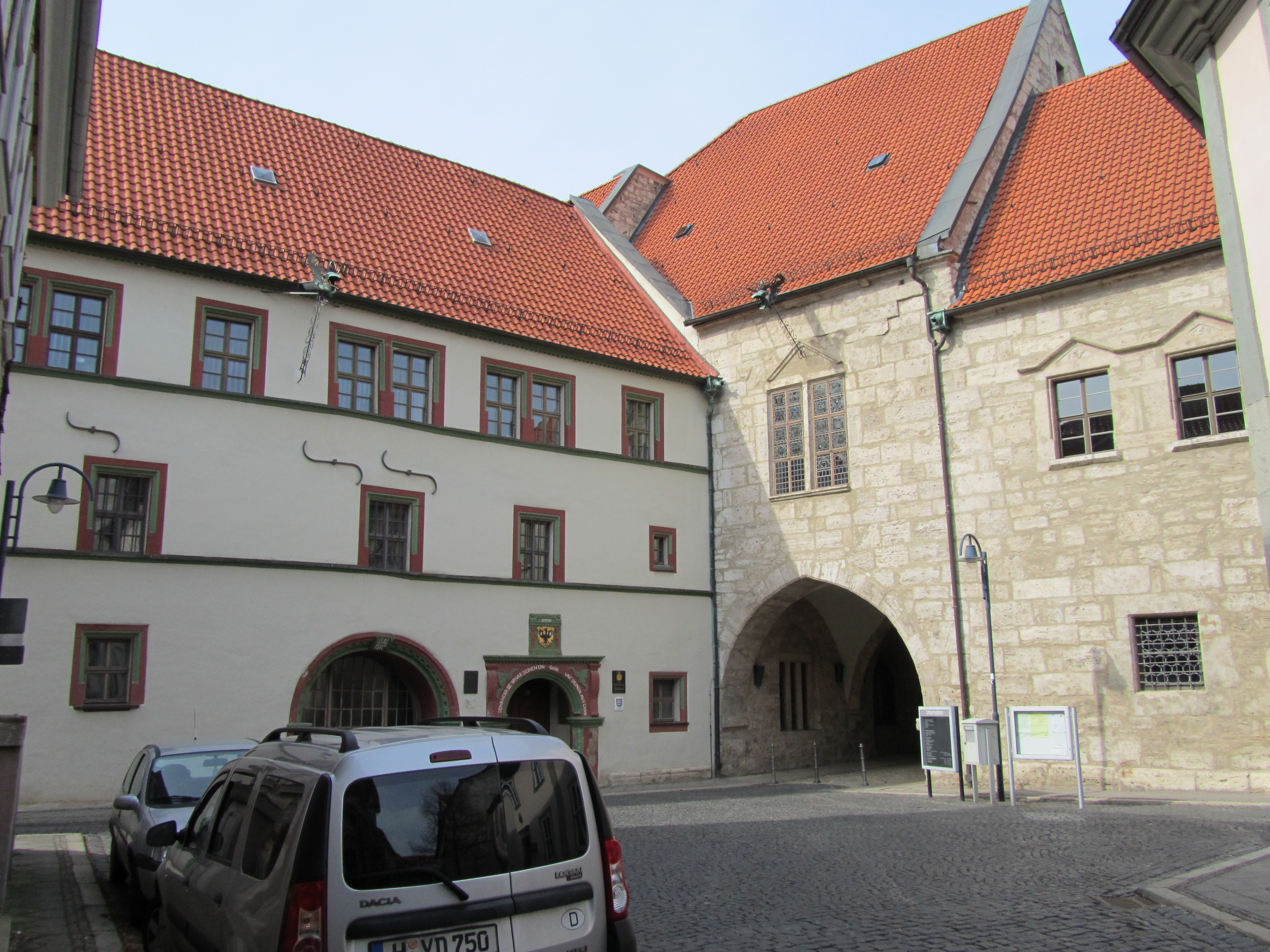
Town hall

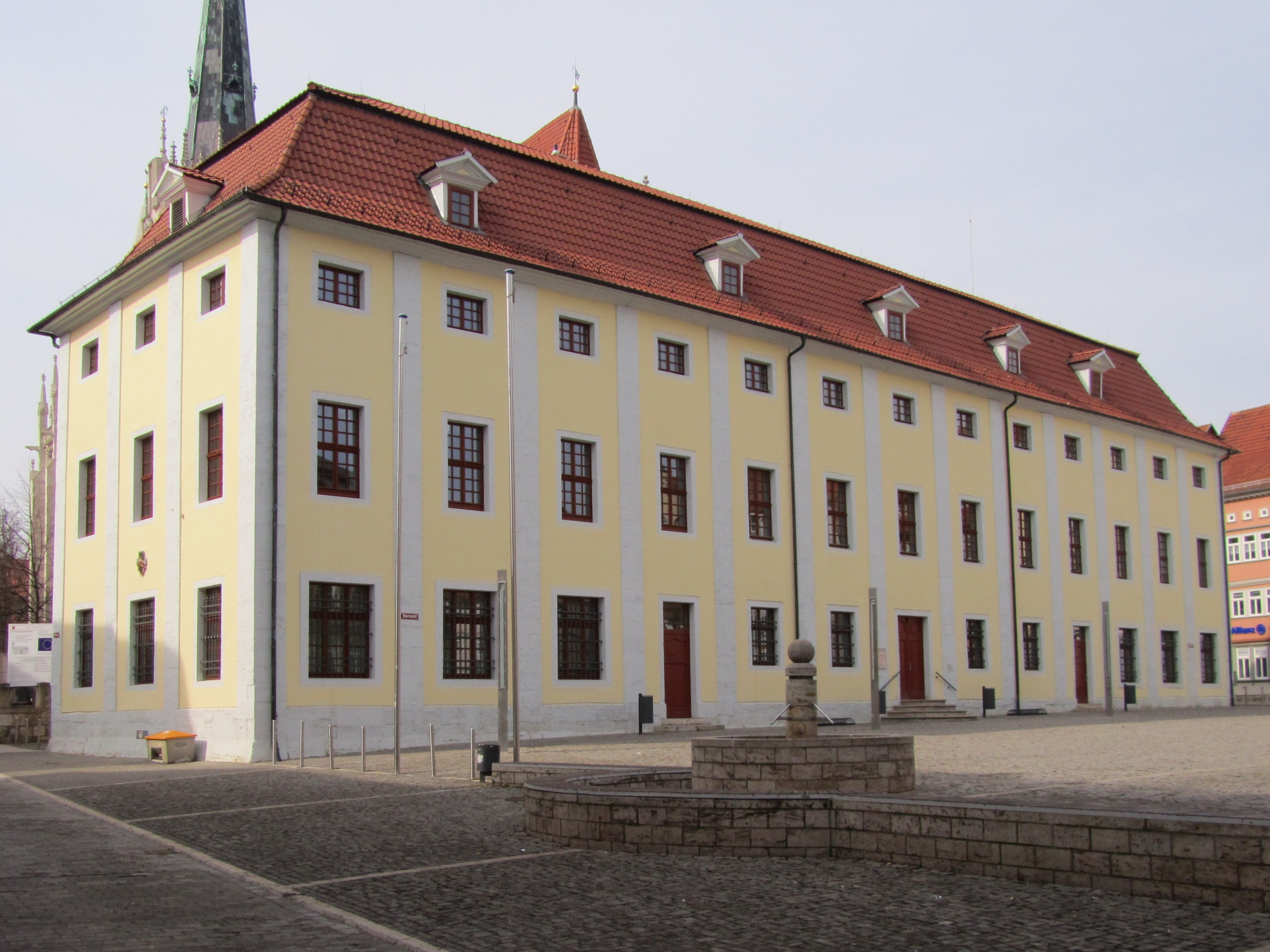
Brotlaube

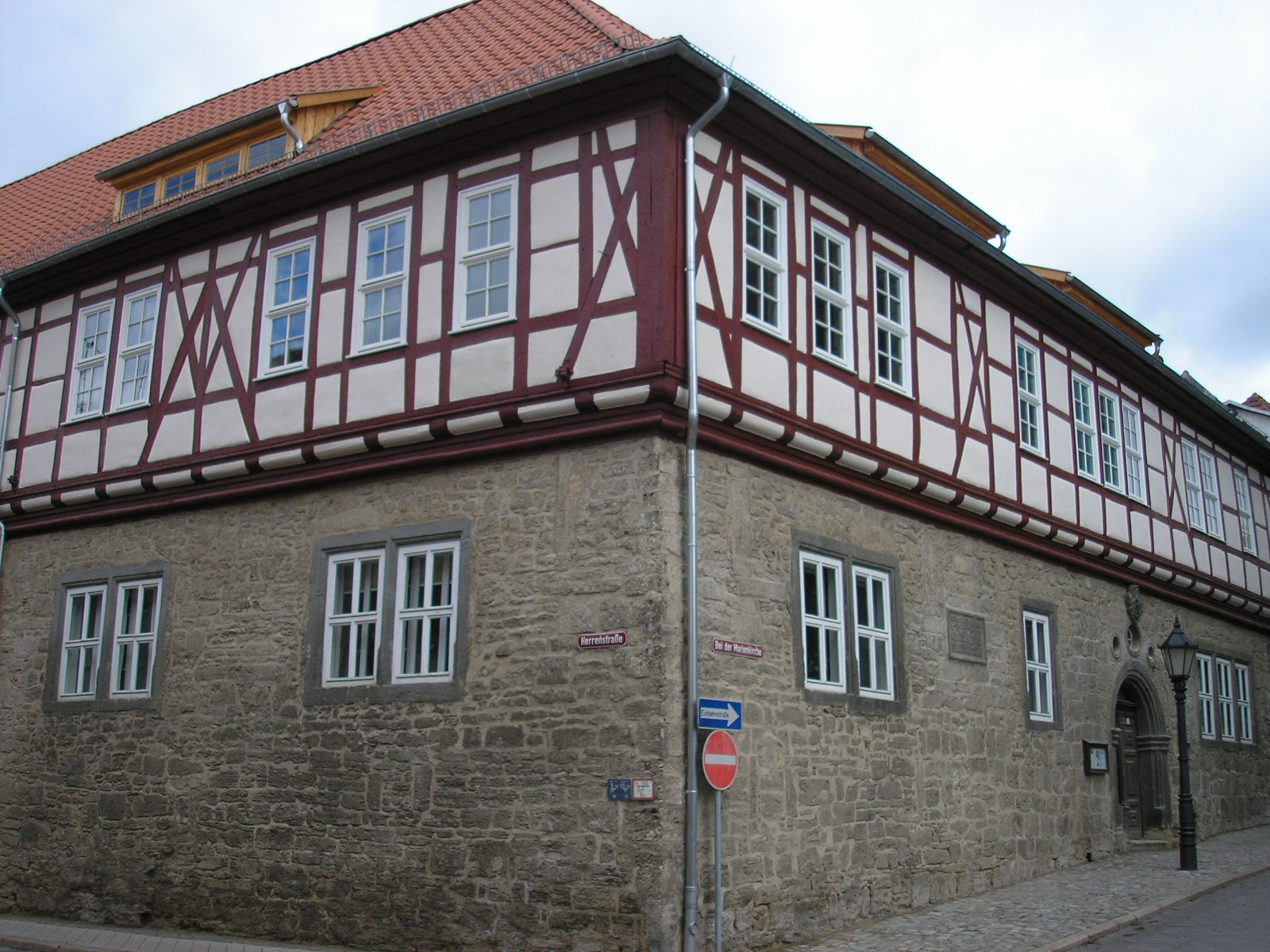
Court of the Teutonic Knights in the new town

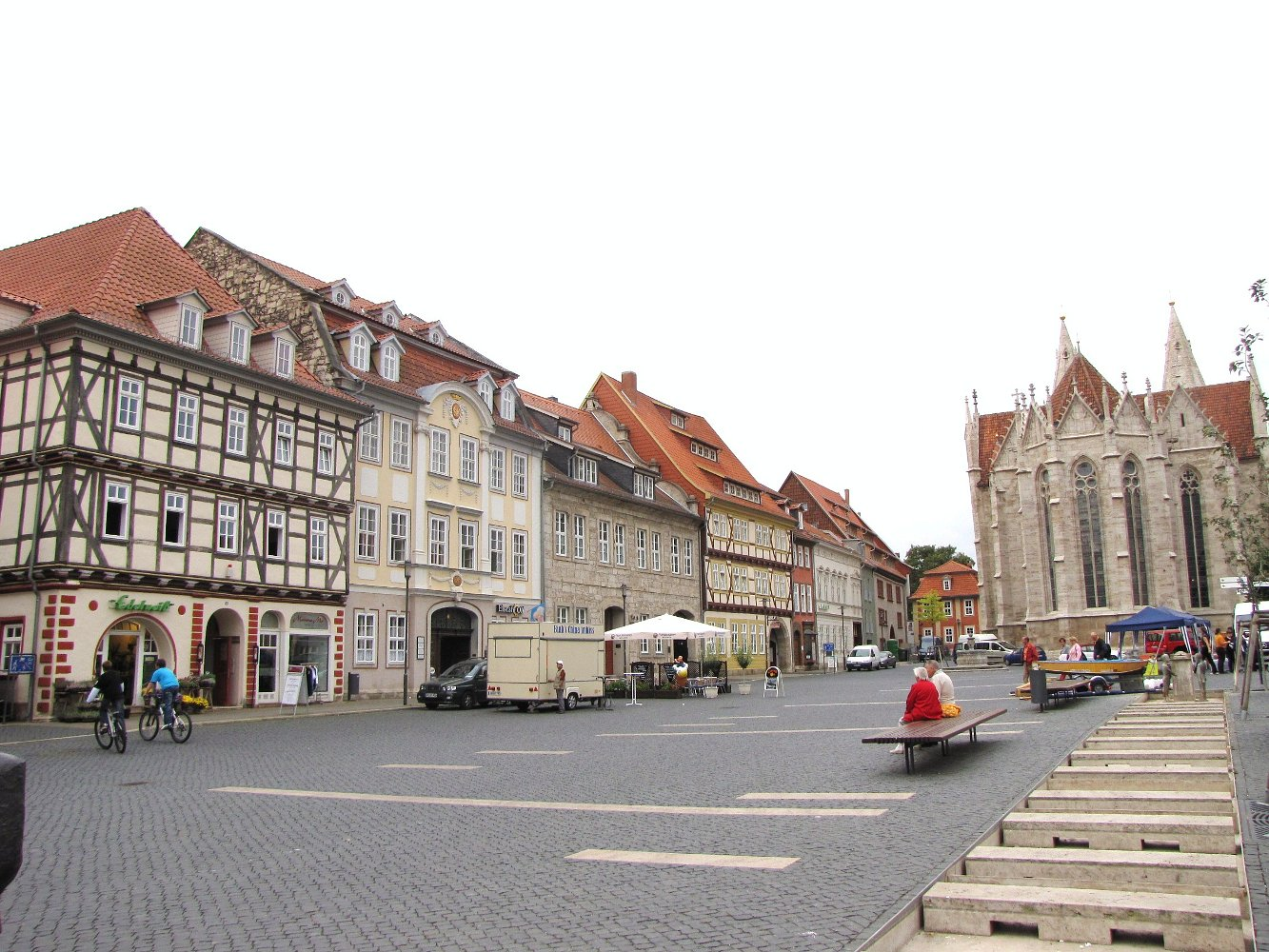
Some citizens' houses at Untermarkt

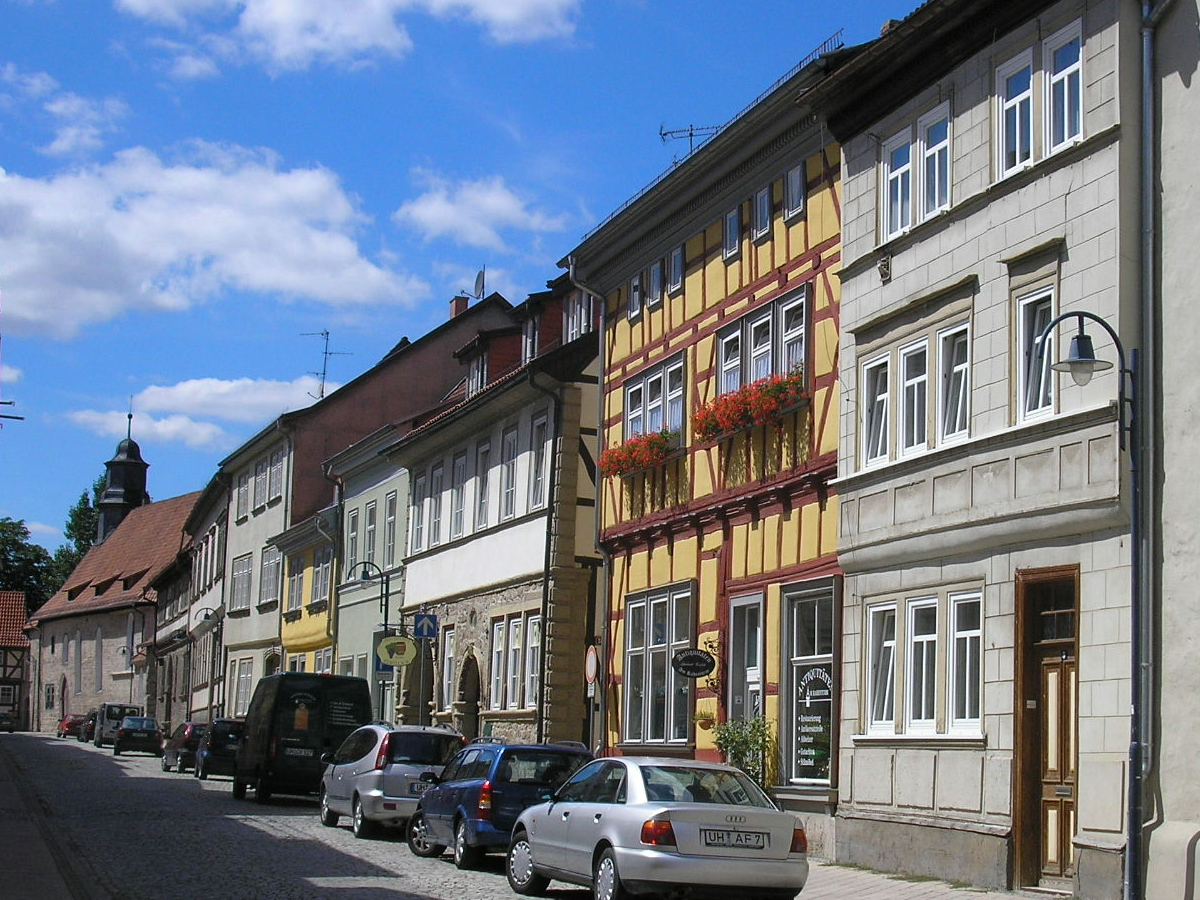
Smaller houses at Holzstraße

== Economy and infrastructure ==
During recent years, the economic situation of the city has improved: the unemployment rate in the Unstrut-Hainich district declined from 21% in 2005 to 10% in 2013 with higher rates in the city than in the bordering rural municipalities. Still, Mühlhausen itself has one of the highest unemployment rates in Thuringia.

=== Agriculture, industry and services ===
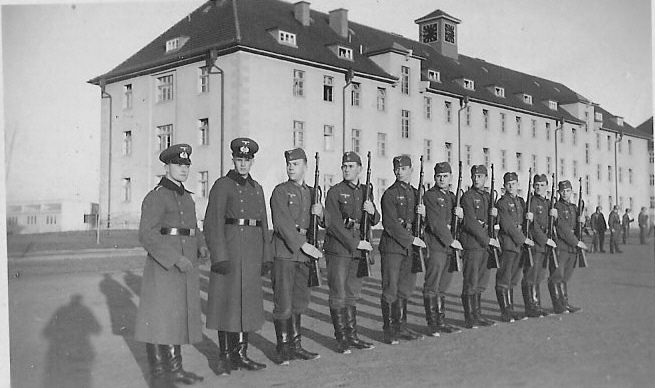
The Mühlhausen barracks in 1937

Agriculture still plays an important role in the Mühlhausen region today. Approximately 55% of the municipal territory is in agricultural use, mostly for growing cereals and vegetables. The region is a centre of the food industry in Germany, especially in the production of conserves like pickles, sauerkraut, apple sauce, cherries and other fruits and vegetables. A well-known product is the Mühlhäuser Pflaumenmus (Mühlhausian plum jam), which has been produced here since 1908.

Production of textiles, machines and electrical engineering were major manufacturing industries in Mühlhausen. Nevertheless, most factories were closed after German reunification in 1990. Since that time, Mühlhausen has had some problems finding a new economic core. Compared to other cities in Thuringia, the economic situation is relatively poor. In 2012, there were only 23 companies with more than 20 workers in the industrial sector, employing a total of 1,800 persons and generating an annual turnover of €314 million.

As district capital, Mühlhausen is a regional service hub in retail, health care, cinemas, education, government etc. One of the largest employers was the Bundeswehr, but the closure of the barracks in 2015 lead to a loss of more than 800 jobs in the city. Tourism does not play an important role yet, although the city has many historic sights and the Hainich National Park is only 15 km (9 mi) away. In 2012, there were 52,000 overnight visitors staying for a total of 118,000 nights in Mühlhausen.

=== Transport ===
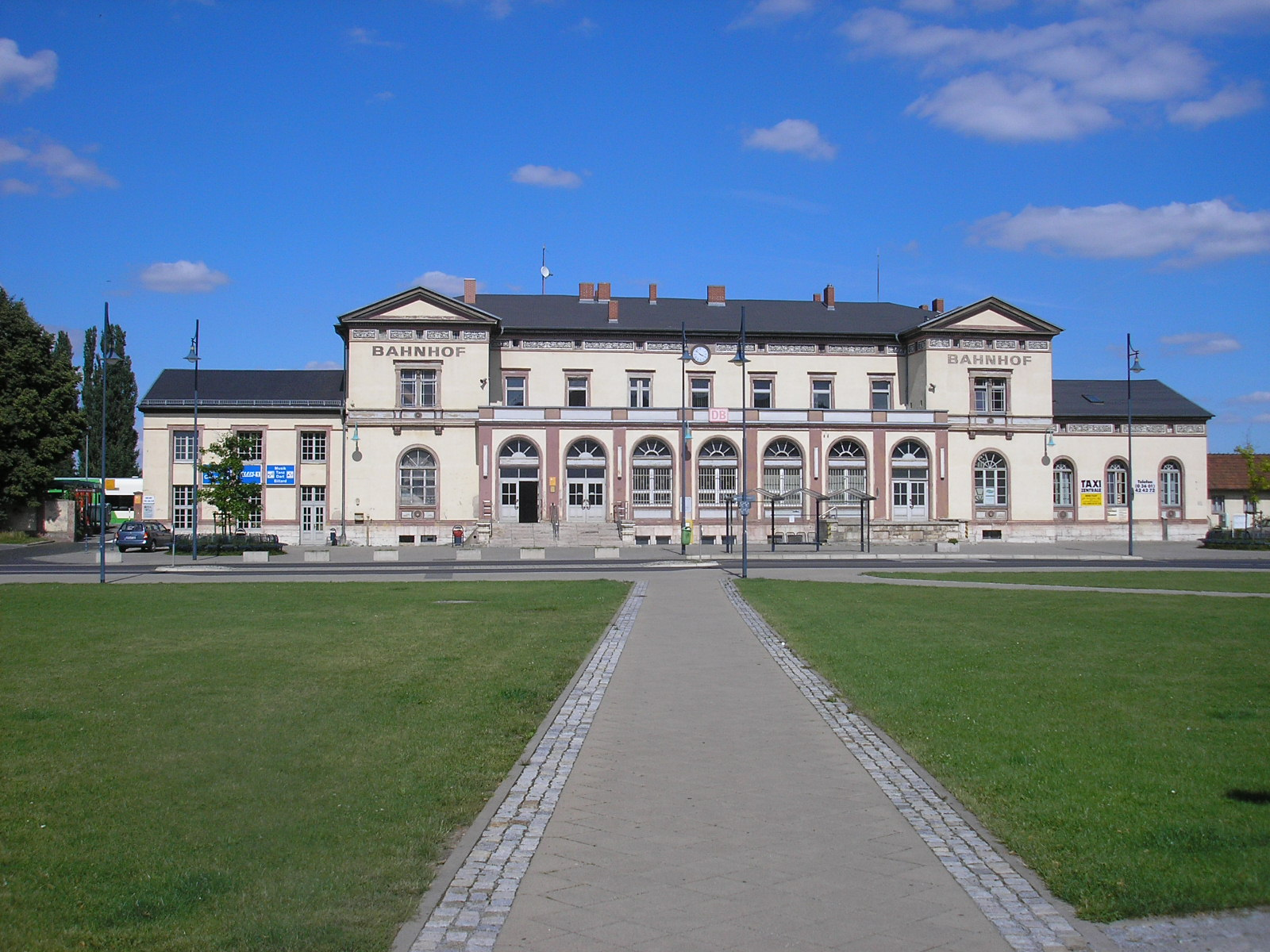
Mühlhausen station

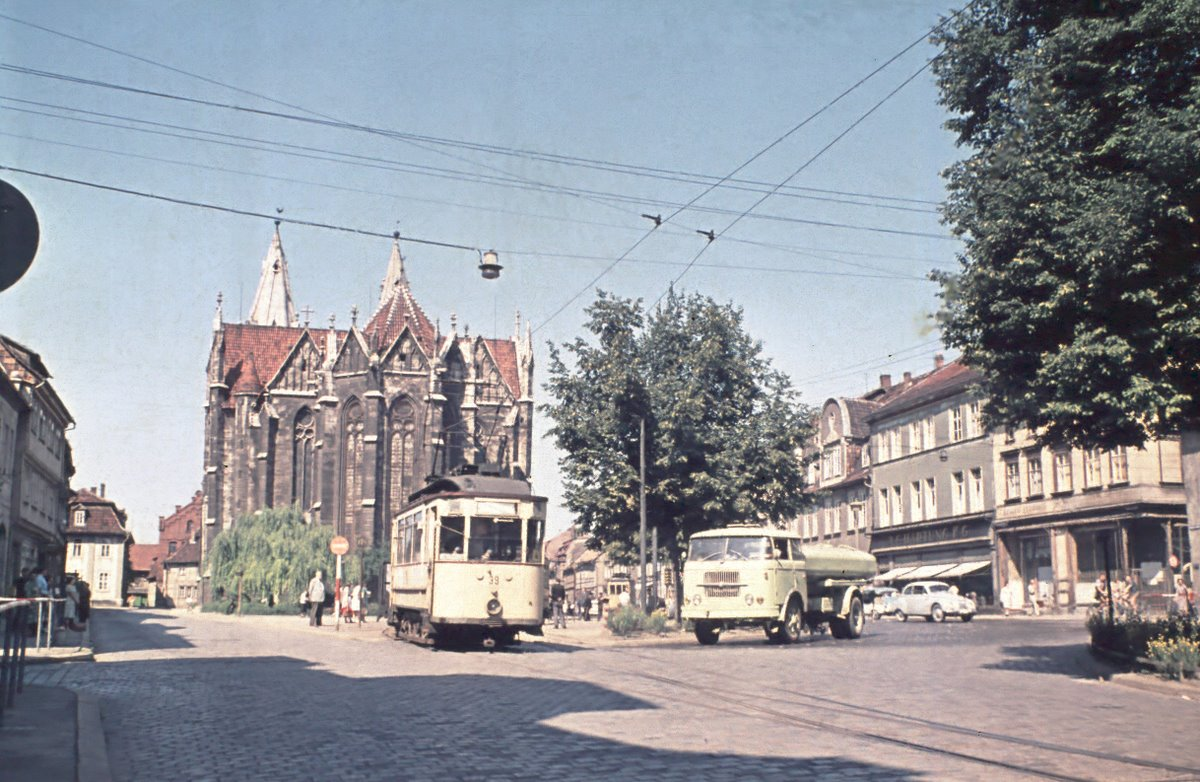
Tram at Untermarkt in 1959

Mühlhausen is connected to the railway by a station at the Gotha–Leinefelde line, opened in 1870. There are some regional express trains to Göttingen and to Zwickau/Glauchau (via Gotha, Erfurt, Weimar, Jena and Gera) running every two hours and some local trains to Leinefelde and Erfurt (unlike the express via Kühnhausen), running every one to two hours. Former local railway connections to Sondershausen in the east and Treffurt in the west were discontinued.

Mühlhausen is the largest city in Thuringia without a direct connection to the Autobahn. The Bundesautobahn 4 near Eisenach is 30 km (19 mi) to the south and the Bundesautobahn 38 near Leinefelde is 30 km (19 mi) to the north. The connection to the city is via the Bundesstraße 247 (which is the most important route) to Leinefelde in the north and Bad Langensalza (with further connection to Erfurt and Gotha) in the south, the Bundesstraße 249 to Eschwege in the west and Sondershausen in the east and secondary roads to Bleicherode in the north, Eisenach in the south and Küllstedt in the north-west. Municipal traffic is mainly via the ring road along the inner city walls, where the load is high on the eastern side at Kiliansgraben. Therefore, a bypass road east around Mühlhausen is in planning to keep the transit traffic out of the city. This is part of a larger set of measures to improve the connections of Mühlhausen by extending the B 247 between Leinefelde, Mühlhausen and Bad Langensalza.

The next local airport is the Erfurt-Weimar Airport, approximately 60 km (37 mi) to the south-east and the next major airport is the Frankfurt Airport, approximately 230 km (143 mi) to the south-west.

Biking is getting more and more popular since the construction of quality cycle tracks began in the 1990s. The Unstrut Trail and the Unstrut-Werra Trail are long-distance biking trails. Both connect points of touristic interest, the former along the Unstrut river from the Eichsfeld north-west of Mühlhausen to the Saale river near Naumburg, the latter on an abandoned railway track through the Hainich hills from Mühlhausen to Treffurt in the Werra valley.

The Mühlhausen tramway network was established in 1898 and discontinued in 1969. Since that time, there has been a bus network for local transport within the city and to neighbouring communities.

=== Education ===
There are two Gymnasiums in Mühlhausen: one state-run and one Protestant. There was a school of education in Mühlhausen until 1990, when it was merged into the later University of Erfurt.

== Politics ==
=== Mayor and city council ===
The first freely elected mayor after German reunification was Hans-Dieter Dörbaum, who served from 1990 to 2012. Since 2012, Johannes Bruns of the Social Democratic Party (SPD) has been mayor. The most recent mayoral election was held on 15 April 2018, and the results were as follows:

Candidate	Party	Votes	%
Johannes Bruns	Social Democratic Party	6,917	62.7
Ines Goldmann	Christian Democratic Union	2,042	18.5
Charlott Zitschke	Independent	1,489	13.5
Björn Kirchner	Independent	576	5.2
Valid votes		11,024	98.6
Invalid votes		155	1.4
Total		11,179	100.0
Electorate/voter turnout		27,957	40.0
Source: Wahlen in Thüringen

The most recent city council election was held on 26 May 2019, and the results were as follows:

Party	Lead candidate	Votes	%	±	Seats	±
Christian Democratic Union (CDU)	Volker Bade	8,453	18.7	▼2.3	7	±0
Citizens' List for Mühlhausen	Stefan Sippel	8,266	18.3	▼2.9	7	▼1
Social Democratic Party (SPD)	René Seyfert	7,158	15.8	▼12.5	6	▼4
Alternative for Germany (AfD)	Ronny Hermann Poppner	6,806	15.1	New	5	New
The Left (Die Linke)	Steffen Thormann	5,504	12.2	▼6.6	4	▼3
Alliance 90/The Greens (Grüne)	Micha Hofmann	3,827	8.5	▲2.2	3	▲1
Free Voters (FW)	Thomas Ahke	3,678	8.1	New	3	New
Free Democratic Party (FDP)	Bastian Boelecke	1,527	3.4	▼0.9	1	▼1
Valid votes		15,206	97.6			
Invalid votes		373	2.4			
Total		15,579	100.0		36	±0
Electorate/voter turnout		30,268	51.5	▲10.7		
Source: Wahlen in Thüringen

== Twin towns – sister cities ==
Mühlhausen is twinned with:

- Tourcoing, France
- Eschwege, Germany
- Münster, Germany
- Kronstadt, Russia
- Saxonburg, United States

== Notable people ==
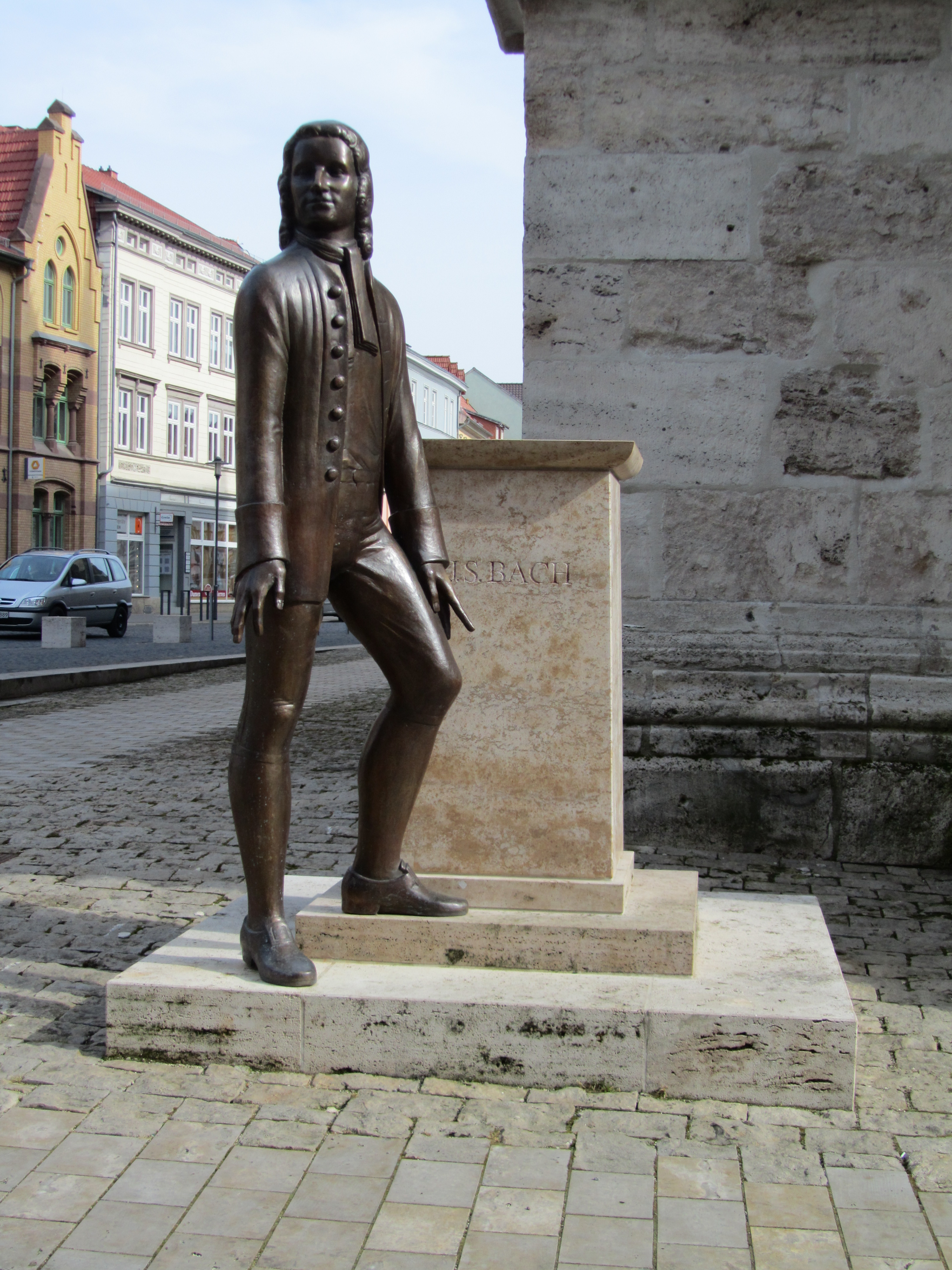
Johann Sebastian Bach monument next to St Blaise's Church where he worked in 1707–1708

- Yom-Tov Lipmann-Muhlhausen (? – after 1420), 14th century Talmudist
- Joachim von Burck (1546–1610), composer
- Johannes Eccard (1553–1611), composer and kapellmeister
- Wilhelm Gottlieb Tilesius von Tilenau (1769–1857), scientist, doctor, draftsman and member of the first Russian sailing expedition around the world
- John Adolphus Etzler (1791–1846?), American author, socialist theorist
- Friedrich August Stüler (1800–1865), architect
- John (Johann) August Roebling (1806–1869), civil engineer famous for the design of the Brooklyn Bridge
- Wilhelm Gerhard Walpers (1816–1853), botanist
- Adolph Methfessel (1807–1878), composer
- Ernst Methfessel (1811–1886), composer
- Christian Wilhelm Alheit (1817–1882), missionary to South Africa
- Paul Mankiewitz (1857–1924), bank manager
- Günter Fromm (1926–1994), author
- Werner Leich (1927–2022), Lutheran bishop
