= Fürsteneck House =

Former Renaissance patrician house in Frankfurt's old town, destroyed in 1944

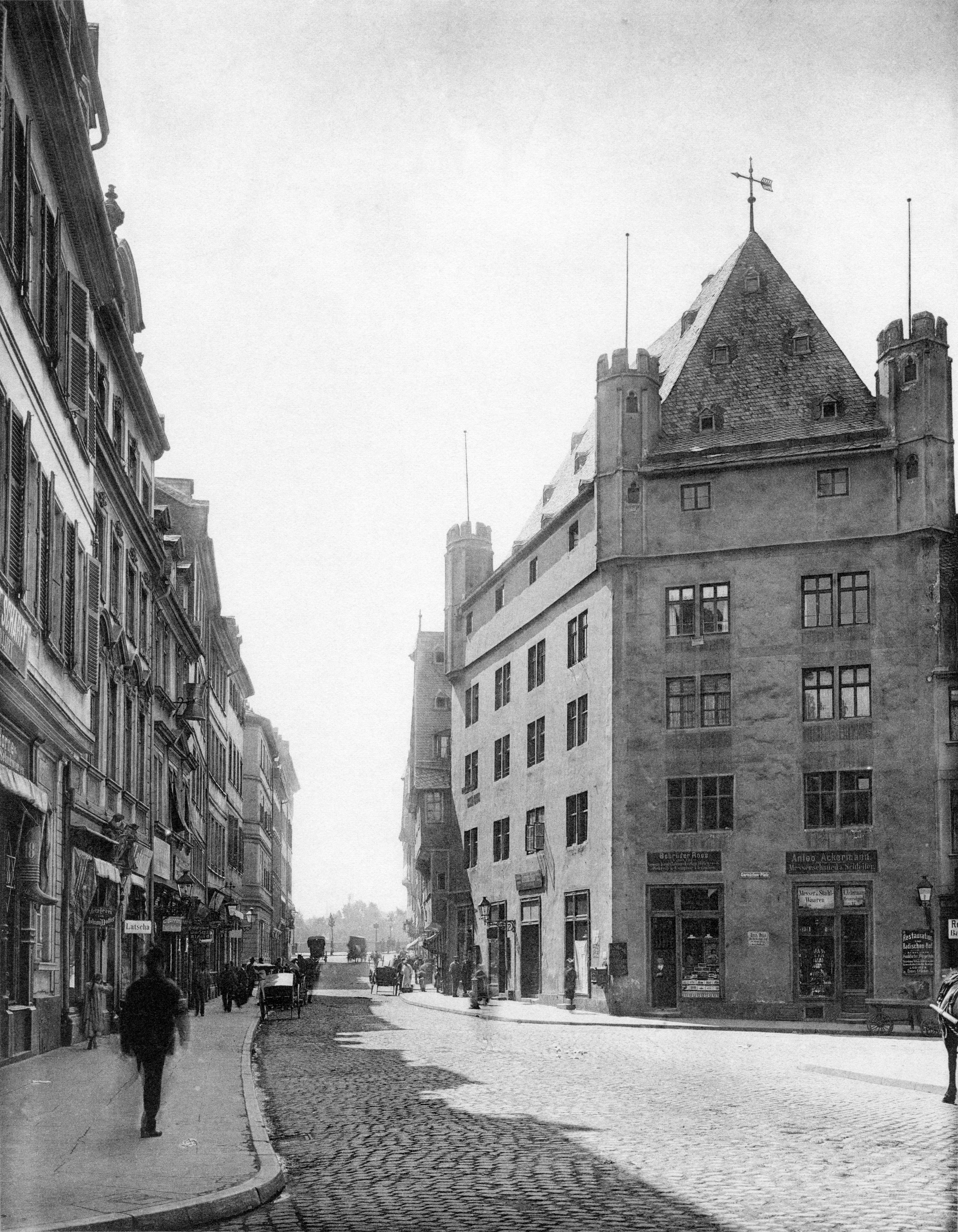
House Fürsteneck, 1901(Photograph by Carl Friedrich Fay)

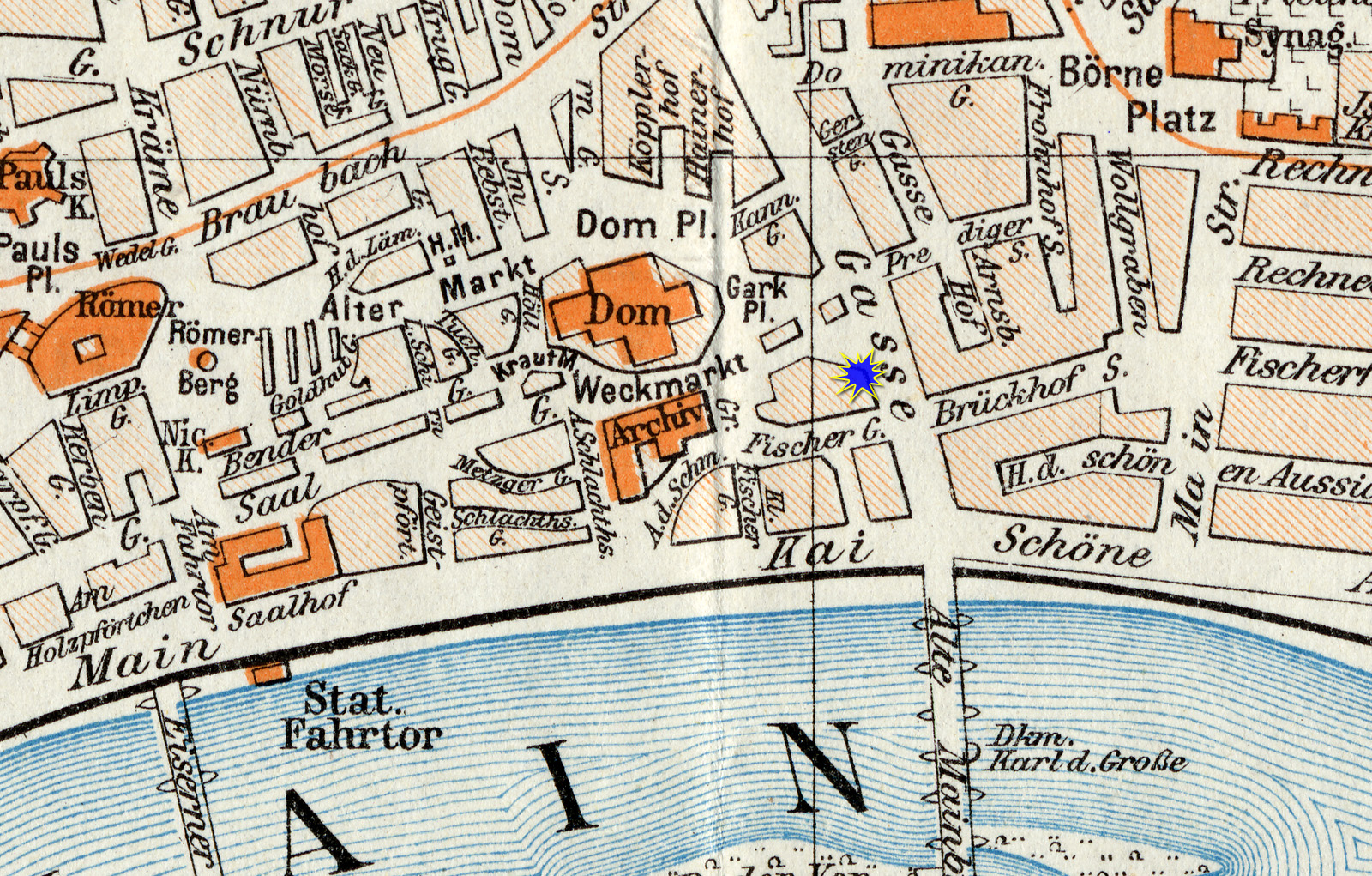
Location of the building in the Frankfurt old town(Chromolithograph, 1904)

The Fürsteneck House, often simply called Fürsteneck, was a historic building in the old town of Frankfurt. It stood east of the Imperial Cathedral of Saint Bartholomew in an obtuse angle at the south-eastern corner of the so-called Garküchenplatz, which opened towards the Fahrgasse; its address was Fahrgasse 17. Primarily because of its largely preserved Renaissance interior, but also due to its high architectural and historical value, the house, built in the mid-14th century, was one of the city's most famous sights.

In March 1944, the Fürsteneck was completely destroyed during the Allied bombing raids on Frankfurt; the interior fittings, which had been evacuated, burned at the same time in the Museum für Kunsthandwerk. After the Second World War, the plot was redeveloped in a modern style, so the building must be counted among the lost monuments of Frankfurt's old town.

== History ==
=== Prehistory and construction period ===
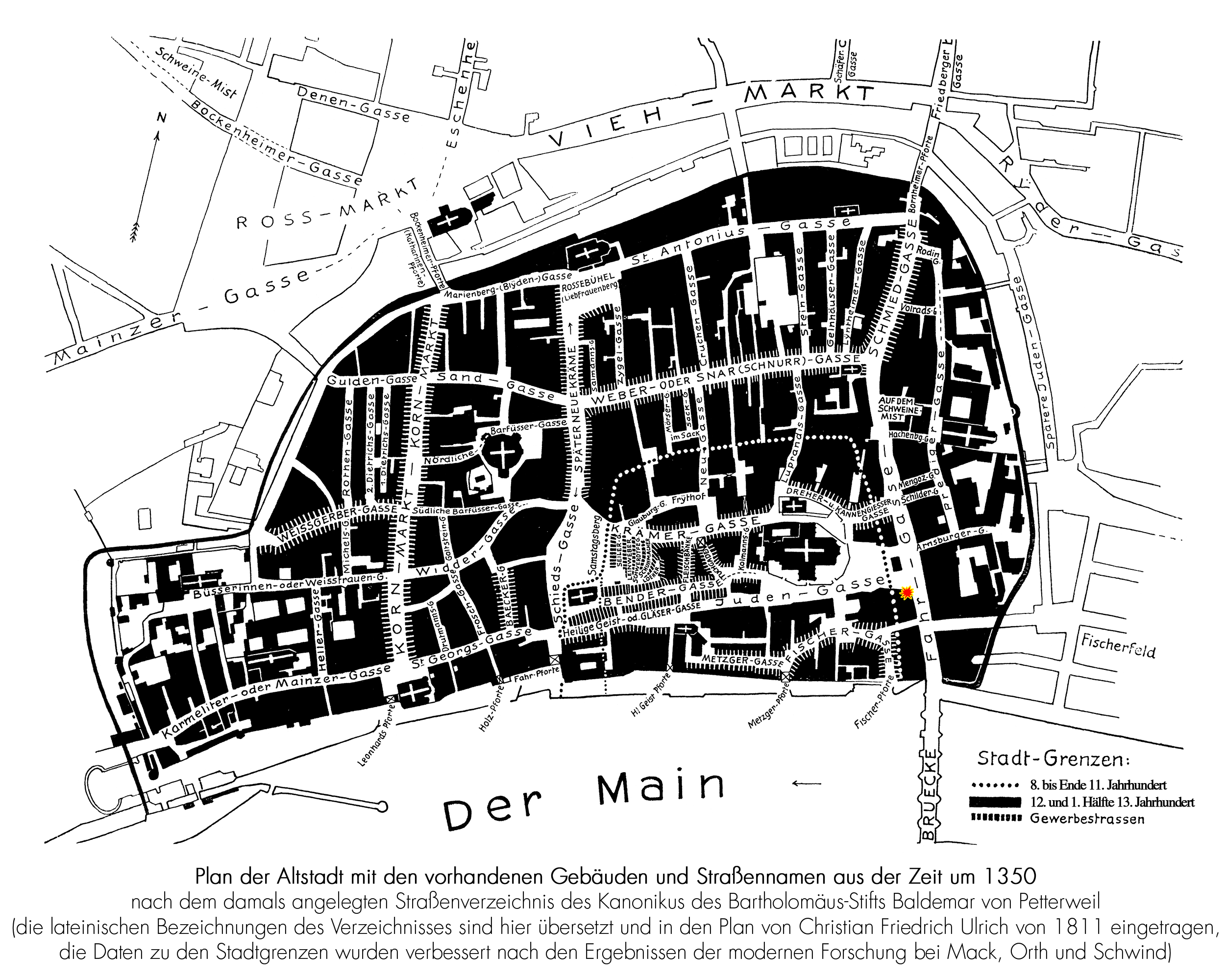
Map of the Frankfurt old town around 1350 showing the Fürsteneck, based on the records of Baldemar von Petterweil, transferred to the 1811 city plan by Christian Friedrich Ulrich von 1811 (Lithograph)

Like most of the land east of the cathedral, the plot on which the Fürsteneck was built belonged to the former Jewish quarter of Frankfurt. The site is first mentioned in 1362, only 13 years after the worst pogrom to date, in which the entire Jewish population of the city had been murdered. The claim by the city historian Johann Georg Battonn that the predecessor building had belonged to a Jewish family named Liepmann must be regarded as pure speculation due to the lack of evidence. The houses in the quarter that had not been burned down following the annihilation of the Jewish community were confiscated by the city; the plots were initially rented out and later also sold.

In the 1350s, Johann von Holzhausen and his wife Guda probably acquired the plot. The Holzhausen family was one of the most important noble families in medieval Frankfurt: Johann, like many of his descendants, was a councillor, mayor, and member of the still-existing Ganerbschaft of Alten Limpurg.

A detailed contract dated 18 May 1362 between the Holzhausen family and their neighbours provides the first precise information about ownership and building activity. It stipulated the construction of a stone gable wall between the two properties that would support the ridge beam of the neighbouring house. Although the contract does not describe the entire building, the reference to its apparently exceptional height is sufficient to identify it as the Fürsteneck, which remained the dominant building (apart from the cathedral) in the eastern old town until the 20th century. Most 20th-century architectural histories also date the construction of the Fürsteneck to 1362, making it one of the earliest houses of its type; today only the Steinernes Haus on the Römerberg survives. The name Fürsteneck is first documented in 1399; the etymology of the name remains unclear. The suffix -eck (corner) was common in old Frankfurt, which had no house numbers until the mid-18th century, for buildings on corners. The first syllable may simply have been a popular designation for a house occupied by one of the city's most prominent patricians.

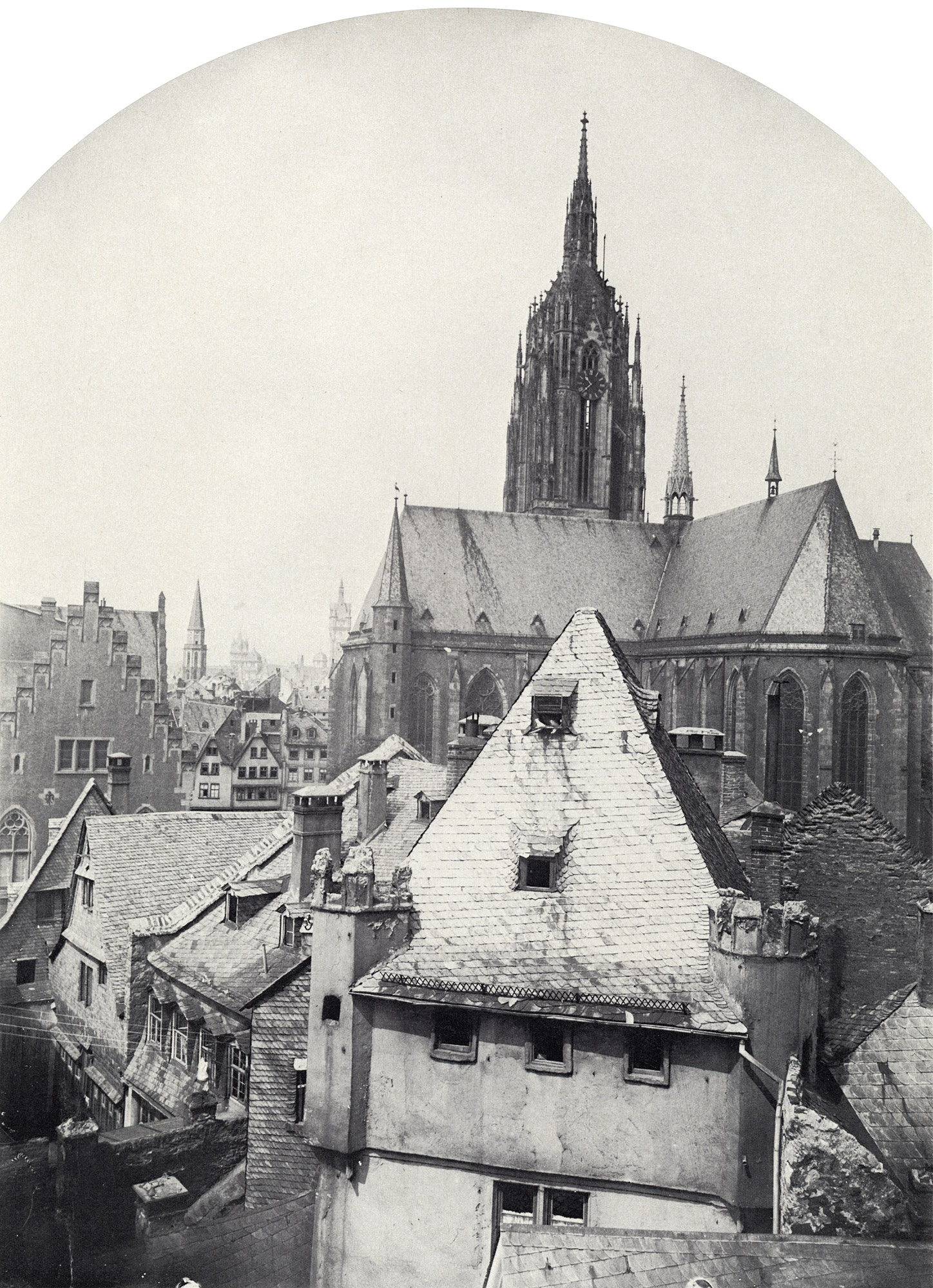
Tower Zu den drei Sauköpfen, 1905 (Photograph by Carl Andreas Abt)

Unlike other Gothic stone buildings in Frankfurt's old town, the Fürsteneck displayed several distinctive features from the outset, explainable by both its history and its location. The entire block in which the Fürsteneck appears rather built-in on most 19th- and 20th-century images did not exist in the 14th century. The building originally stood almost alone, together with the associated Tower Zu den drei Sauköpfen (see image) at the eastern end of the former cathedral cemetery. The complex remained intact into the 20th century but was no longer easily recognisable, having been surrounded by new buildings, especially in the 17th and 18th centuries; the tower formed the rear of the house Zum kleinen goldenen Hirsch (Garküchenplatz 3). Sauköpfe (an old German term) referred to the three crenellated corner turrets on its roof walkway, which in identical form also protected the four corners of the Fürsteneck.

The complex was further surrounded by an eight-metre-high wall, creating a kind of castle courtyard between the Fürsteneck and the tower (which served as a bergfried), containing stables. The Matthäus Merian plan of 1628 still hints at this layout, though it is imprecise here; the accurate Ravenstein plan of 1862 reveals the situation but already includes later buildings. On most modern photographs, the view of the tower is obscured by the Badischer Hof (Garküchenplatz 1), probably built in the 18th century over the former castle wall. The fortress-like construction was a response to the dangers of the time: in 1355 the guilds had risen against the ruling families; shortly afterwards, in 1364, Johann von Holzhausen replaced Mayor Jakob Knoblauch before the end of his term and also ousted the popularly elected second mayor Henne Wirbel. A house capable of withstanding street violence was thus a prudent investment.

Moreover, in the 14th century the Fahrgasse was one of the few paved streets and a major artery of Frankfurt. Traffic from the south via the Alte Brücke and from the north through the Bornheimer Pforte flowed along it. Owning a fortress-like building on this street meant influence and power, which could only benefit Holzhausen in his position as mayor. After his death on 7 February 1393 the house passed to the von Breidenbach family.

=== 15th and 16th centuries ===
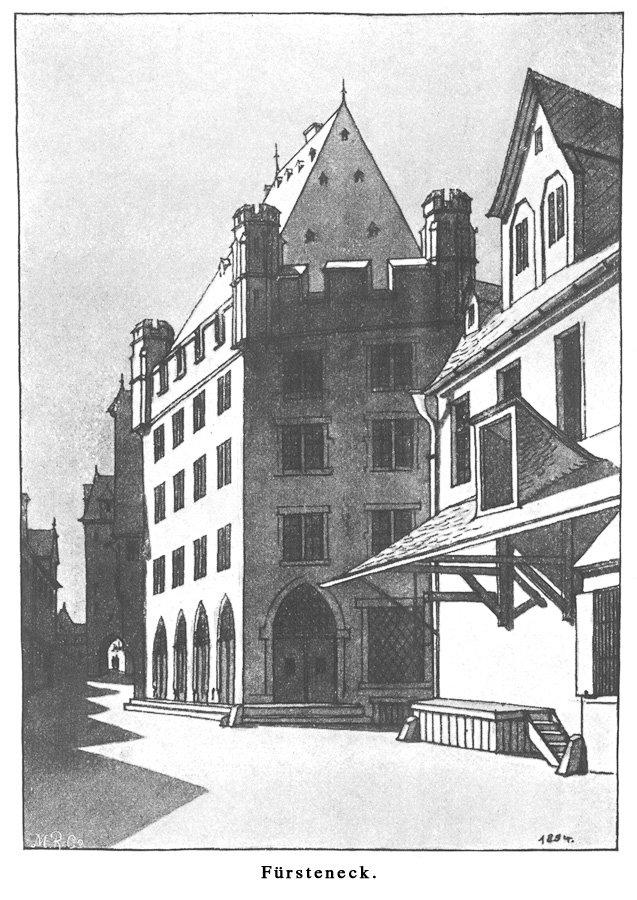
Fürsteneck in its original medieval state, before 1791(Historicising drawing by Carl Theodor Reiffenstein, 1845)

In 1447 Johann von Breidenbach sold the Fürsteneck for 1,530 Gulden to his son-in-law Wigand von Heringen, married to Anna von Breidenbach. Battonn's claim that the house belonged at that time to a Philipp von Fürstenberg – repeated uncritically in some post-war literature – lacks any historical evidence, as does the suggestion that the building dated from this period.

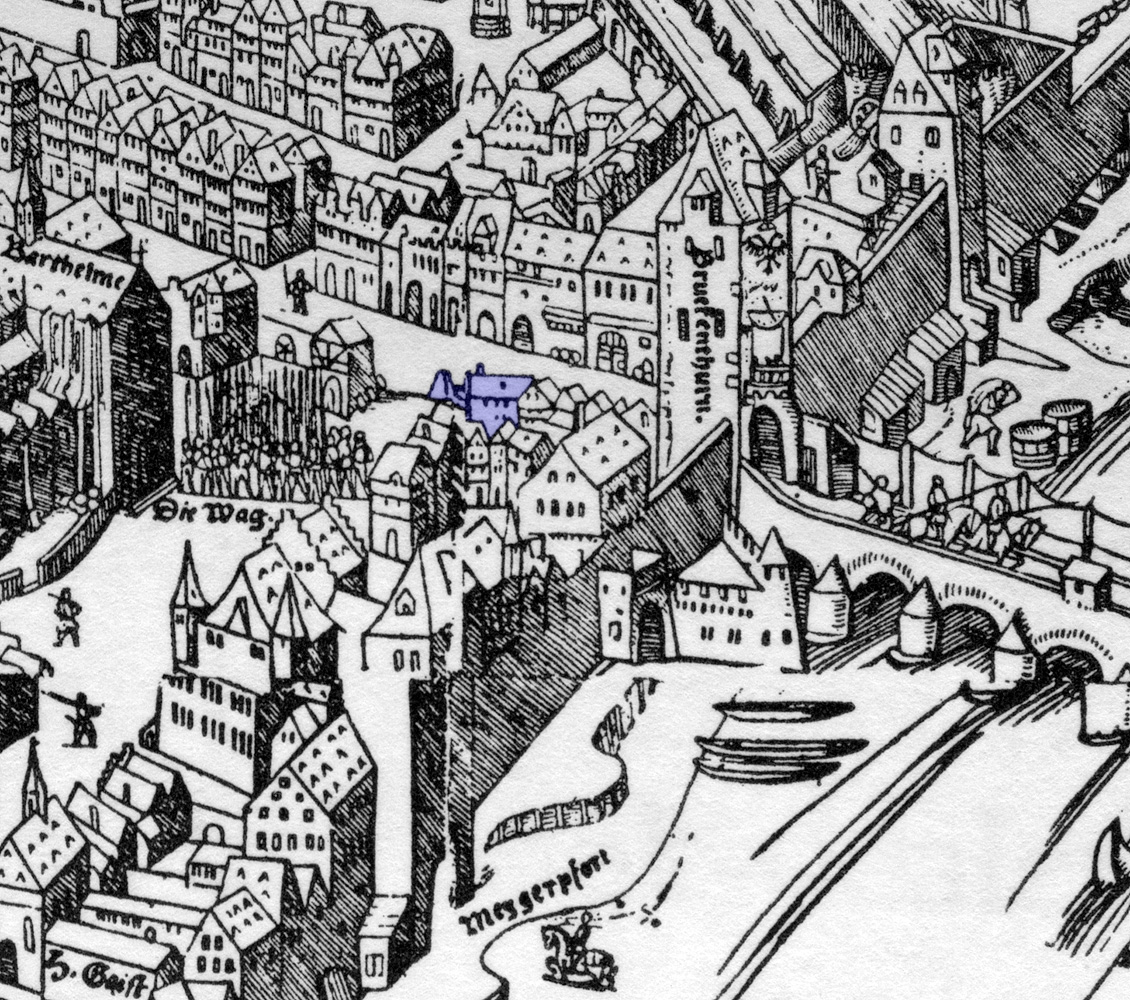
The south-eastern old town with the Fürsteneck, 1552(Woodcut by Conrad Faber von Creuznach)

Wigand von Heringen was also a major figure in Frankfurt's history. Tax records show that in the year he purchased the house he paid the second-highest tax in the city – 132 pounds of heller. In 1478 he became junior mayor and died, like Johann von Holzhausen 99 years earlier, in the Fürsteneck in 1492.

The house remained in the Heringen family and related families (Hynsberg and Schleunitz zu Stauchitz) for the following decades. After two centuries continuously owned by patricians, it passed in 1582 for the first time to (albeit high-ranking) burghers when the wealthy cloth merchant Siegfrid Deublinger bought it together with several neighbouring houses for 3,200 Gulden. Deublinger, from a rich cloth-merchant family that had moved from Ulm to Frankfurt, was also involved in the construction of the Großer Engel and Kleiner Engel on the Römerberg. He only lightly renovated the Fürsteneck without fundamentally altering it.

=== Renaissance period ===
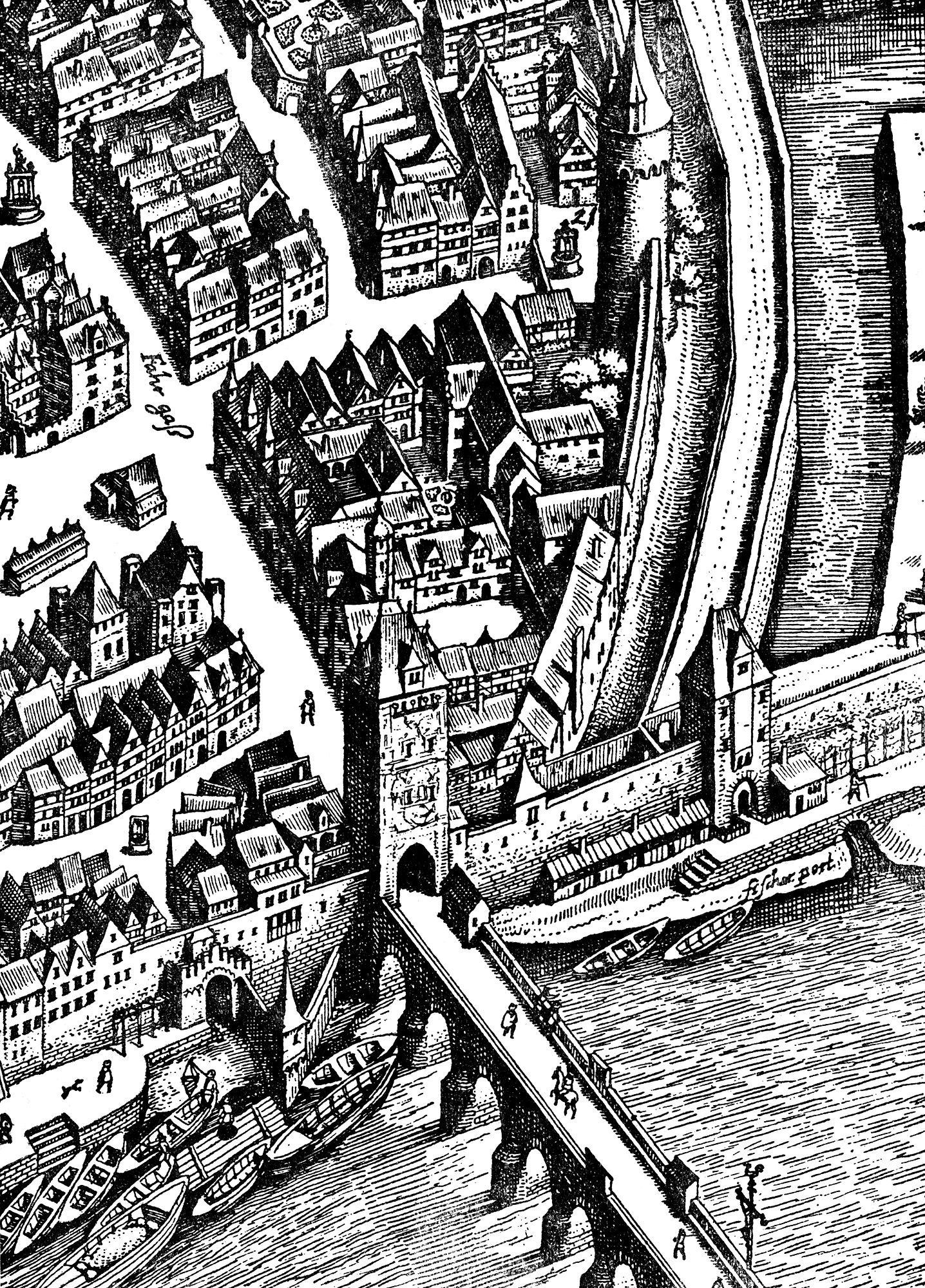
The building on the Merian plan of Frankfurt, 1628

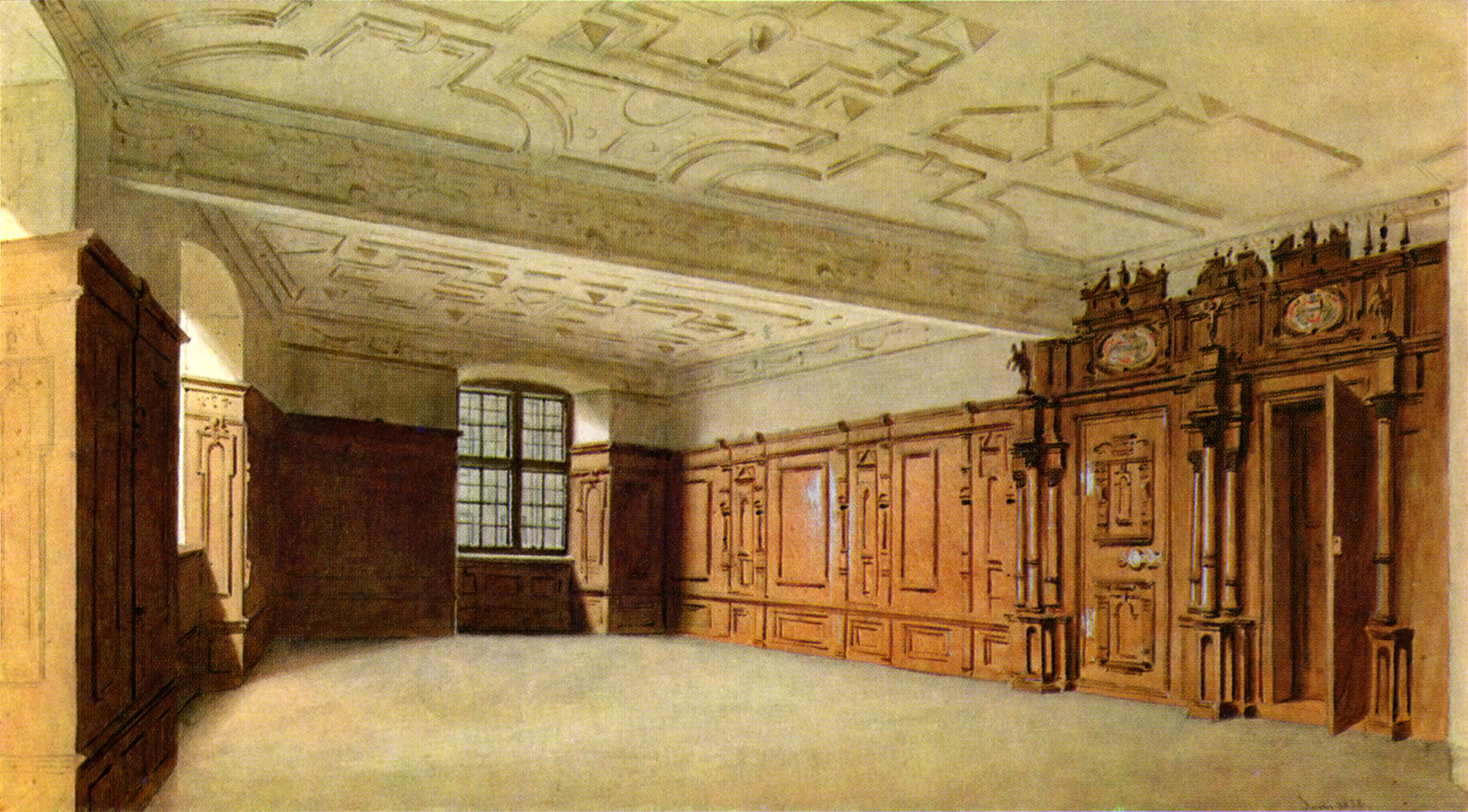
The Fürsteneck room, watercolour by Carl Theodor Reiffenstein, 1853

Around 1600 the Deublinger family sold the western half of the complex to the Unckel family; Siegfried Deublinger died in 1608. In 1609 the remaining parts were sold to Dietrich Goßmann for 5,000 Gulden. Goßmann, a cloth merchant and hat-trimmer from Düsseldorf, had acquired Frankfurt citizenship in 1596 and in 1616 also bought the neighbouring Haus zur Wiede (Fahrgasse 15). The price increase for the now-halved property from 3,200 Gulden in 1582 to 5,000 Gulden in 1609 reflects the strong influx of wealthy Dutch Calvinist refugees driving up property prices.

In 1610 Goßmann concluded a detailed contract with the western neighbour, who now called himself Johann Karl Unckel zu den drei Sauköpfen. The contract confirms that the two plots had previously formed a single property that was now divided. Goßmann had to content himself with a high-walled well courtyard behind the house and block other doors and windows to the courtyard. No further external changes occurred until the late 18th century.

Inside, however, the house experienced its most splendid period under Goßmann: in 1615 he had the first-floor hall panelled with elaborate Renaissance woodwork and the ceiling decorated with equally rich stucco. This interior later became famous as the Rittersaal (Knights’ Hall) or Fürsteneckzimmer (see images).

Dietrich Goßmann died only five years later, on 30 December 1620, in the Fürsteneck. His widow married the cloth merchant Nikolaus Leye in 1623; their son Gerhard continued the business until his death in 1640. In 1674 the Goßmann heirs sold the building for 6,000 Gulden to the cloth merchant Philipp Mangold from Mainz.

=== 18th century to the Second World War ===
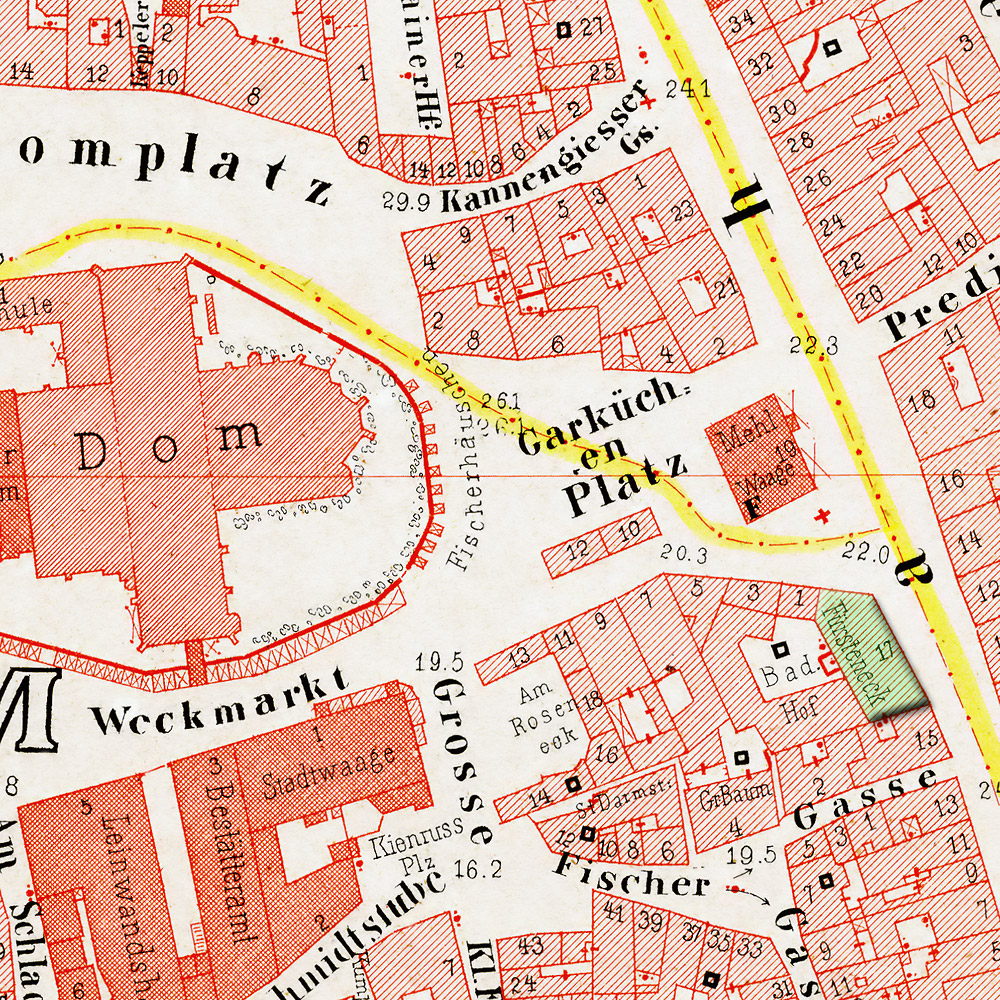
The building on the Ravenstein plan of Frankfurt, 1861

Mangold's heirs sold the Fürsteneck in 1726 for 12,000 Gulden to the cloth merchant Markus Fester. The continuous ownership record then has a brief gap until 1786, when a cloth merchant Johann Peter Bauer sold it to the iron merchant Johann Anton Zickwolff.

Zickwolff apparently modernised the house in the same year in the then-popular Louis-seize style. The pointed Gothic arches on the ground floor were replaced by rectangular openings (see images), Baroque balustrades and door decorations were altered to contemporary taste, and the gable was widened on all sides and extended over the fourth-floor crenellation. Only the first-floor Knights’ Hall remained untouched, although it was actually far too lavish for the prevailing style. Zickwolff not only tolerated but valued the historic interior, having all furniture made in antique style to create a harmonious whole.

In 1860 the house passed to the master-carpenter family Beydemüller. Industrialisation created enormous demand for housing; the large rooms were subdivided into apartments. The Knights’ Hall served as a dance-school rehearsal room. In 1863 the clockmaker Wilhelm Alexander Christ (1836–1927) opened his first shop in the Fürsteneck.

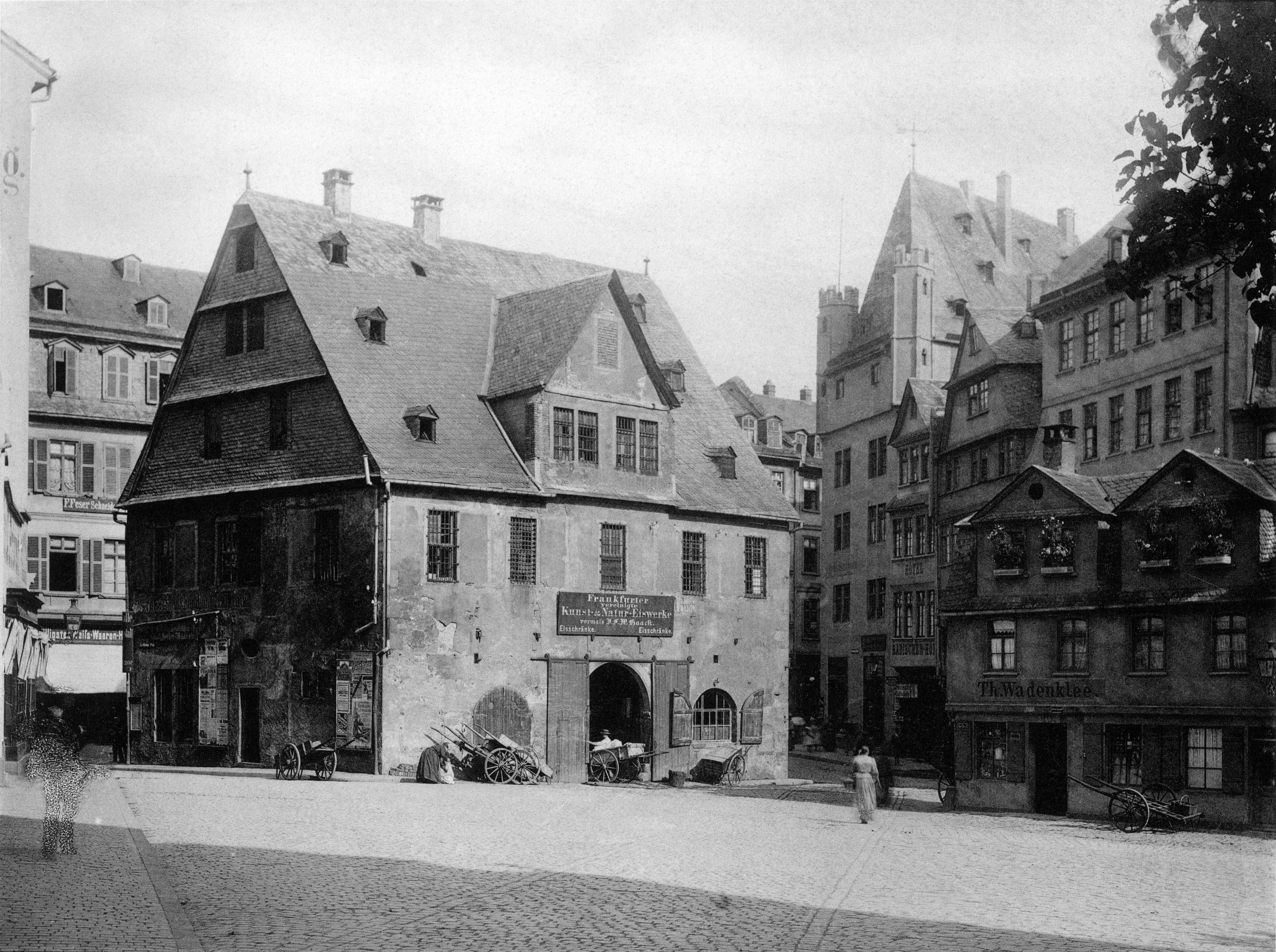
Fürsteneck seen from Garküchenplatz, c. 1880

In 1887 the Beydemüller family sold the wooden panelling for 10,000 marks to the antiques firm J. & S. Goldschmidt; it was bought back a few years later by wealthy Frankfurt citizens and donated in March 1891 to the local branch of the Mitteldeutscher Kunstgewerbeverein, which transferred it in 1908 to the Museum Angewandte Kunst (Museum of Applied Arts), where it was displayed in a dedicated room together with a plaster cast of the original stucco ceiling.

In 1923 the Fürsteneck changed hands for the last time when two Beydemüller heirs offered it for sale together with the southern neighbouring plot. To prevent it falling into the hands of a Saarland butcher who intended to turn it into a meat-processing centre, the Bund tätiger Altstadtfreunde, founded by Fried Lübbecke, purchased it. The building was carefully restored; in 1931 the printing workshop of Paul and Ursula Koch (children of the famous Offenbach typographer Rudolf Koch) was established in the former Knights’ Hall, and in 1934 the Bund moved its office to the second floor.

=== Second World War and present day ===
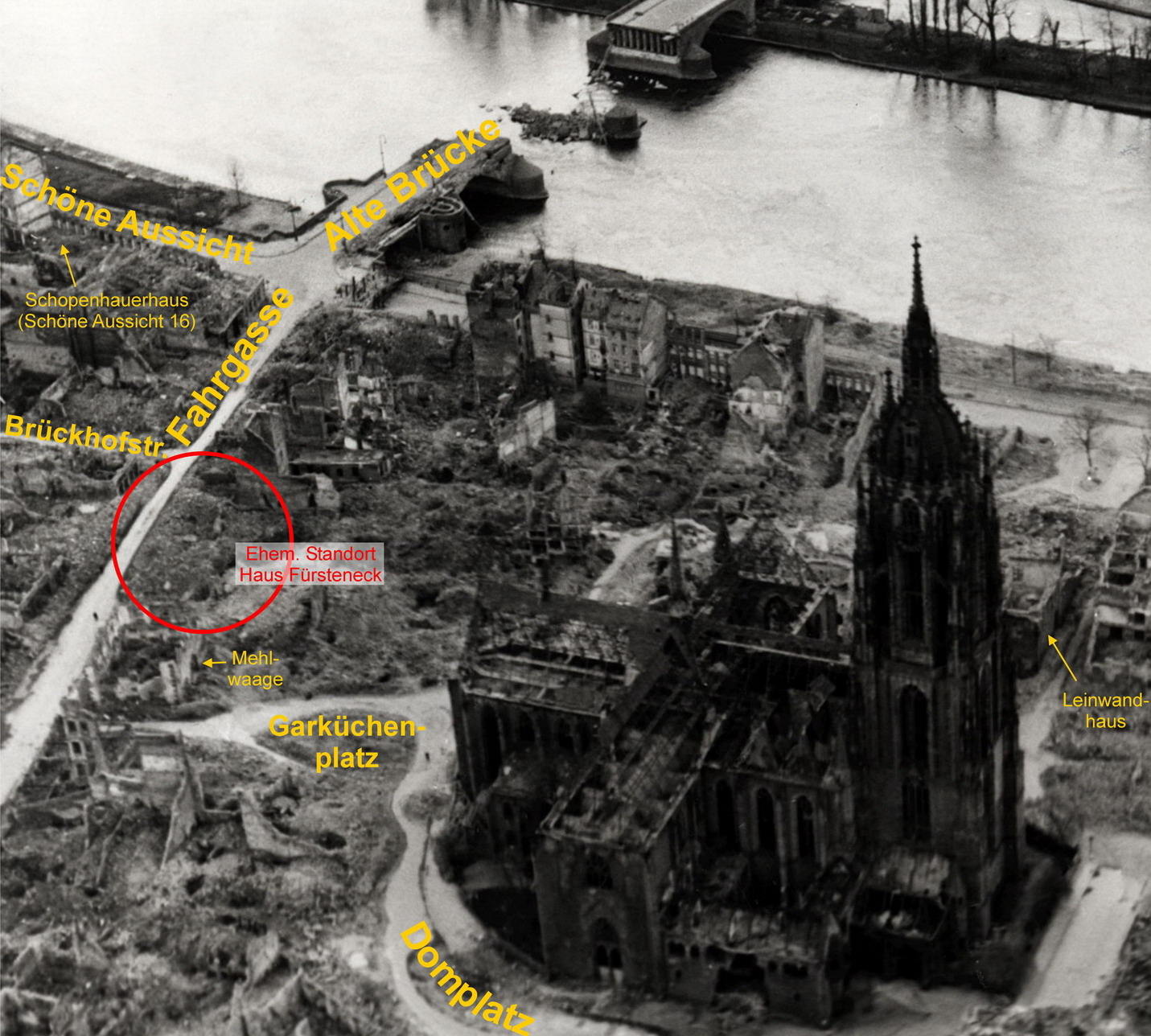
The destroyed Frankfurt old town with the ruins of the Fürsteneck, March 1945

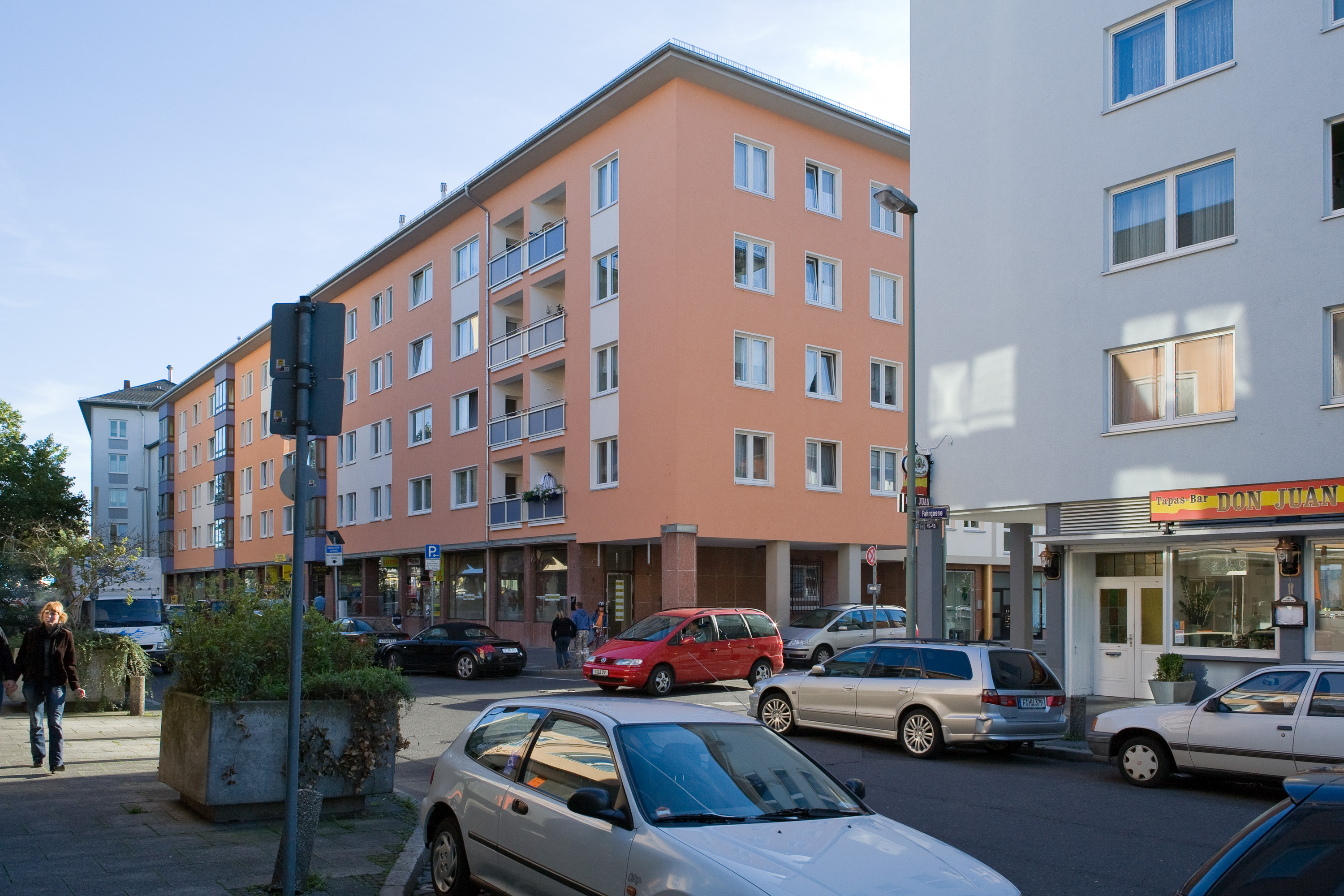
Current appearance from the Fahrgasse

Like most of the old town, the Fürsteneck was destroyed on the night of 18–19 March 1944. Fried Lübbecke described the event:

On 18 March 1944 a terrible night attack by the English destroyed the entire eastern old town as far as the Fahrgasse. A heavy bomb tore through the metre-thick north wall of the Fürsteneck; incendiary bombs set the enormous roof timbers ablaze. On Thursday, 19 March the Fürsteneck stood as a burnt-out ruin together with its bergfried, the Tower Zu den drei Sauköpfen, above smoke and rubble. [...] German pioneers soon blew up the ruins that endangered traffic by collapsing. [...] On 1 April [...] the mighty ruin of the Fürsteneck, blasted by German dynamite, collapsed into dust. Only the Gothic vaults of the eight-metre-high cellar withstood the enormous impact.

— Lübbecke

The original stucco ceiling of the Fürsteneck Room was thus lost. At the same time, the Renaissance paneling in the Museum of Arts and Crafts, which was also severely damaged, burned down. Another comment by Fried Lübbecke confirms the regime's unwillingness to save it, like numerous irreplaceable art treasures, from destruction that had been foreseeable for some time:

"Unfortunately, my repeated requests to remove the Fürsteneck paneling from the Museum of Arts and Crafts were not granted. Now it has been destroyed, even though it was more important to Frankfurt than many foreign works of art.

In the 1950s large-scale modern buildings ignoring the historic plot divisions were erected on the Garküchenplatz and Fahrgasse; the former Fürsteneck site is now occupied by a residential block spanning several old house numbers. Reconstruction is considered unlikely, as the unique interior is lost and the building type is already represented by the surviving Steinernes Haus and Leinwandhaus.

== Architecture ==
=== Exterior ===
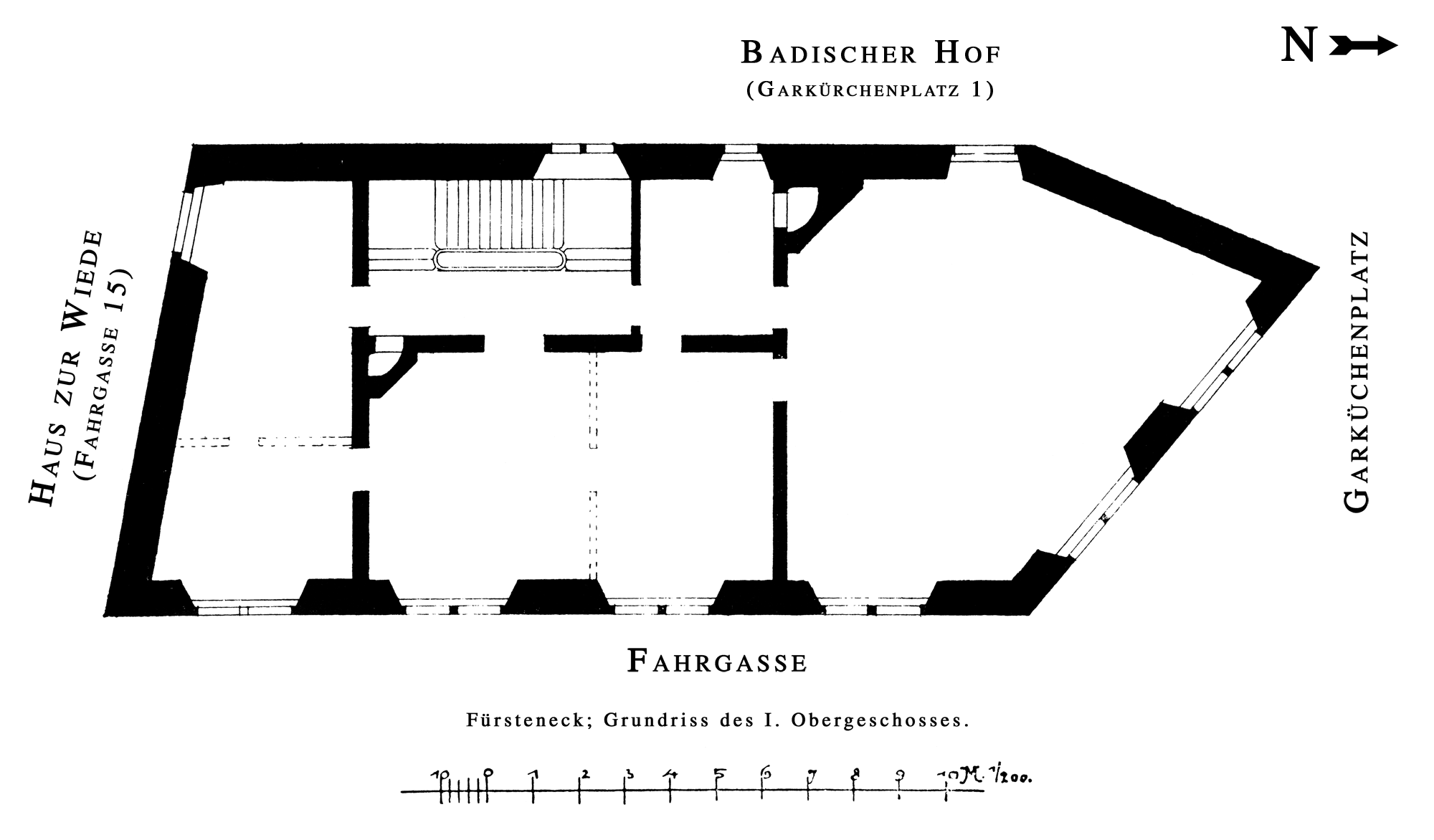
Ground plan, 1st floor

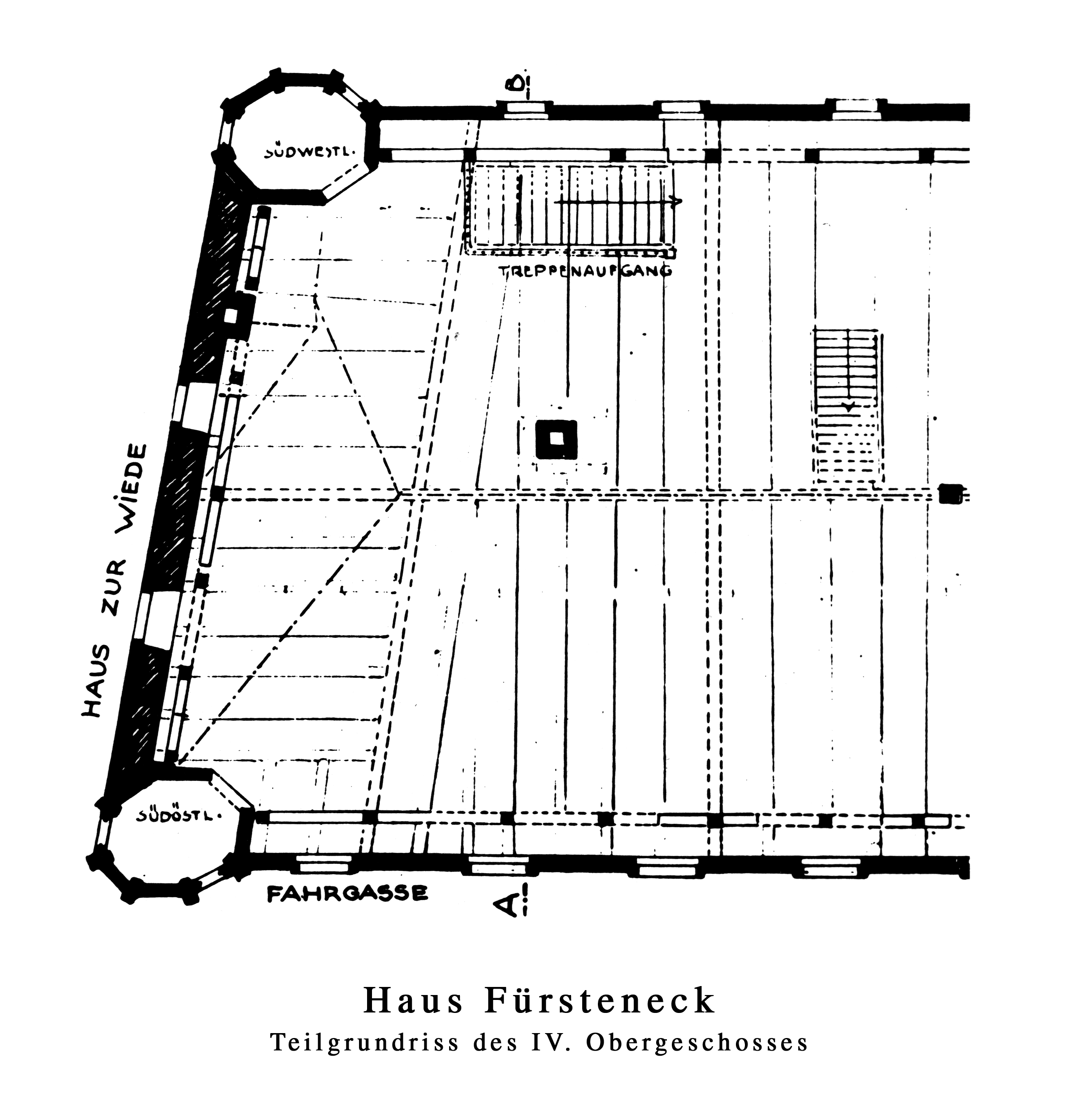
Partial ground plan, 4th floor

Externally the Fürsteneck was, like almost all Gothic Frankfurt stone houses of its type, relatively plain. The ground floor was accessed on the Garküchenplatz side by one and on the Fahrgasse side by four pointed-arch arcades. Above rose a three-storey block with unusually large and numerous mullion windows (two per floor on the Garküchenplatz façade, four on the Fahrgasse). A crenellation with hexagonal corner turrets crowned the building; inside the crenellation rose a steep hip roof containing four further attic storeys. A narrow but walkable defensive gallery ran between the crenellation and the roof.

The building was thus structurally very similar to the later Steinernes Haus on the Römerberg. Distinctive features were the asymmetrical pentagonal ground plan (origin unknown) and the connection to the Tower Zu den drei Sauköpfen, forming a fortress-like ensemble.

The appearance changed only in the 18th century when the roof was raised above the crenellation to gain an extra storey and the pointed ground-floor arcades were replaced by rectangular portals. Later buildings on the Garküchenplatz further concealed the original fortress character.

Carl Theodor Reiffenstein reconstructed the pre-Baroque appearance around 1850 based on reports from contemporary witnesses.

=== Interior ===
==== General ====
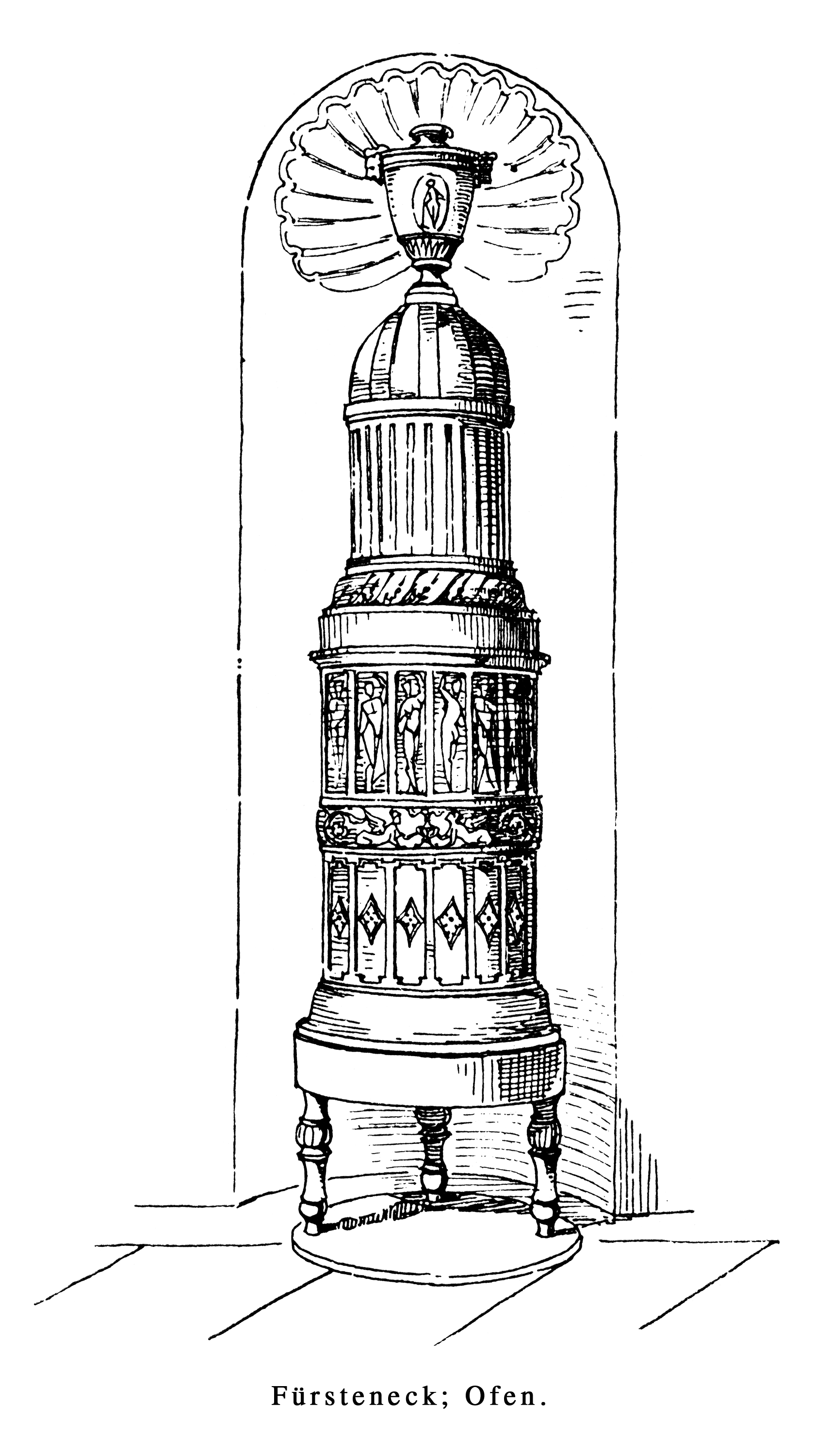
Stove in the Fürsteneck, 18th century

Behind the ground-floor arcades lay a large hall covered by cross vaults, probably used for trade from the earliest times. A staircase on the west wall led to the uniformly planned first to third floors. From the third floor upwards the staircase was narrower but more elaborate; in 1914 it was compared to the (now lost) staircase in the Salzhaus.

==== First-floor Knights’ Hall ====
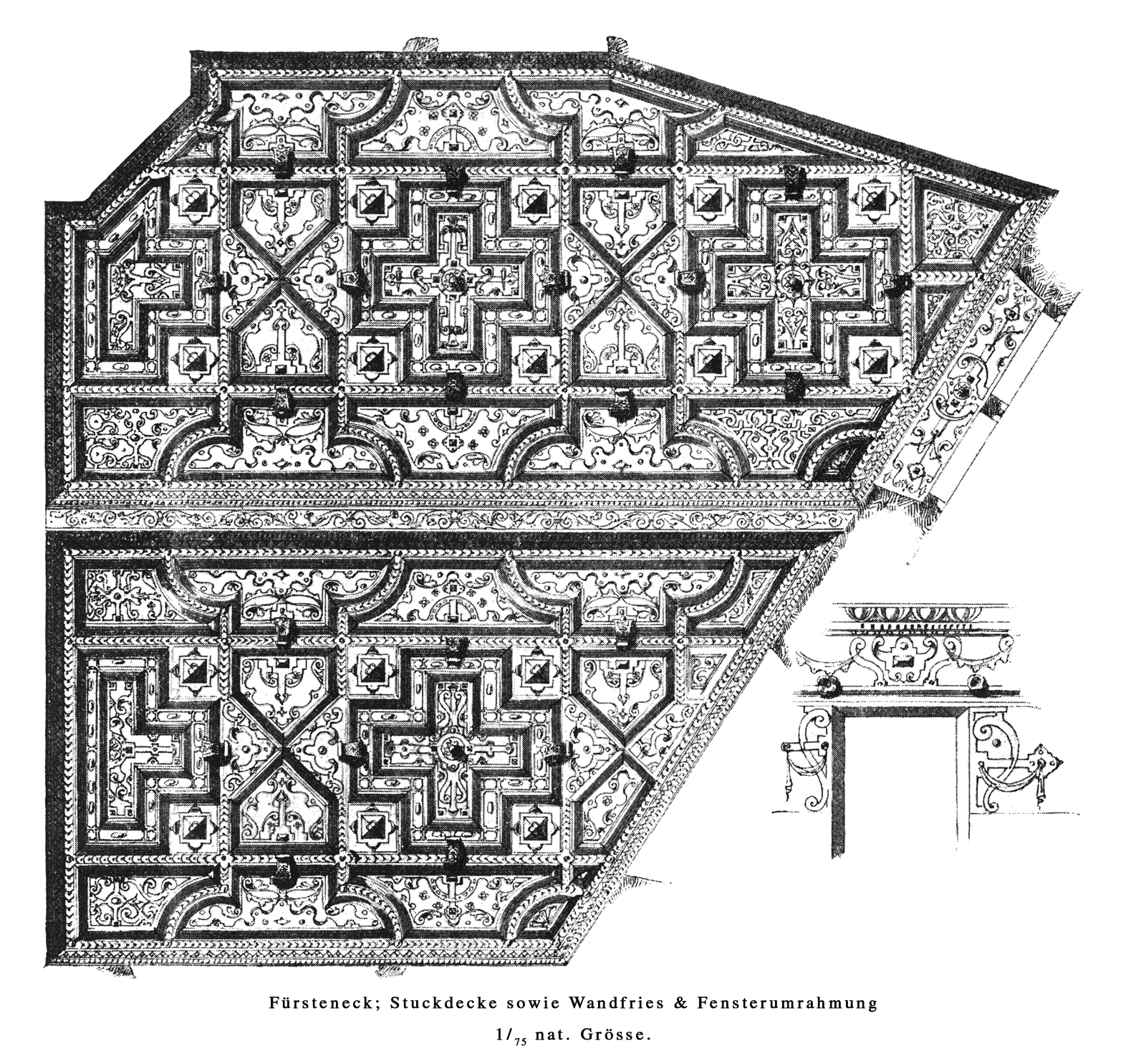
Measured drawing of the stucco ceiling and window surround in the Knights’ Hall

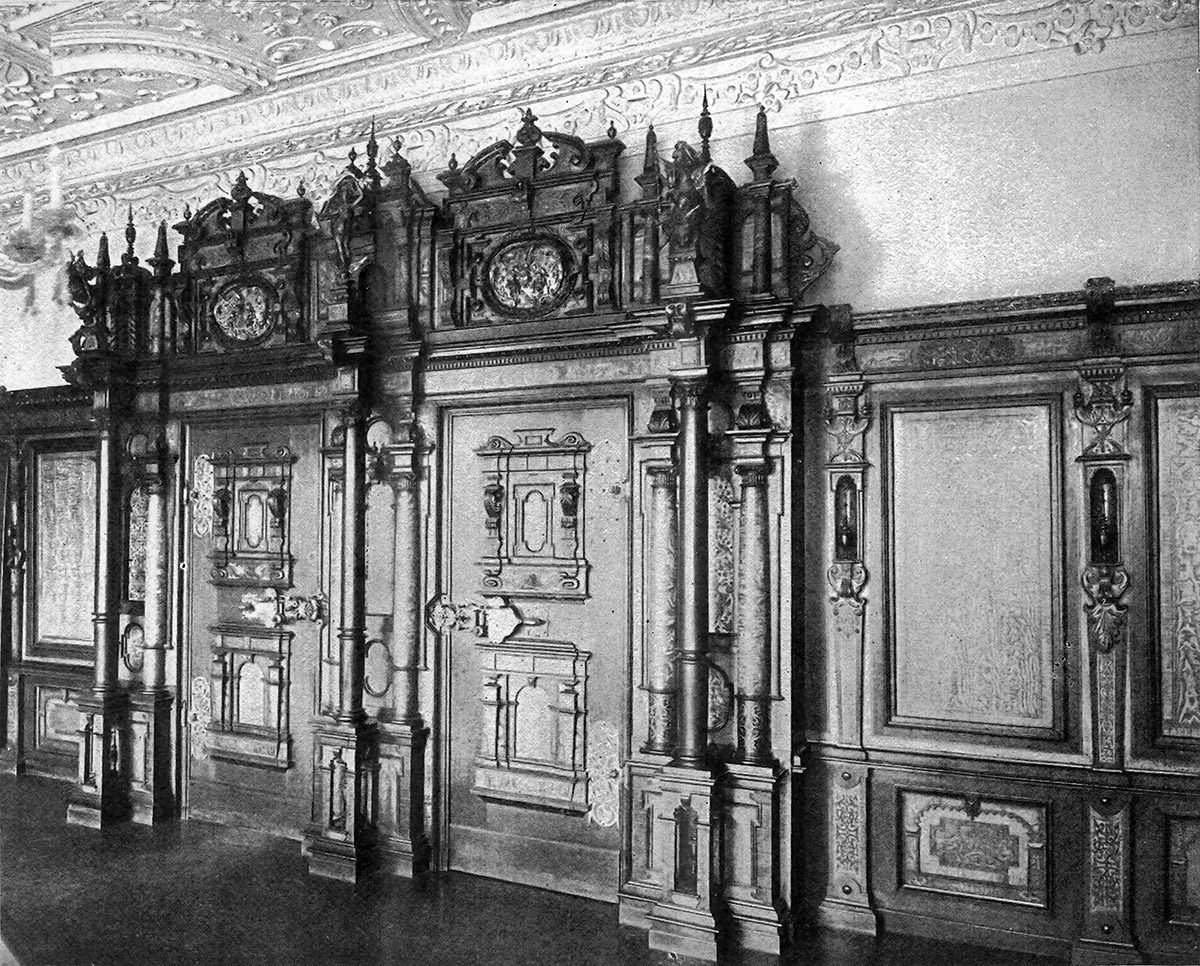
Wood panelling near the door of the Knights’ Hall, photo c. 1890

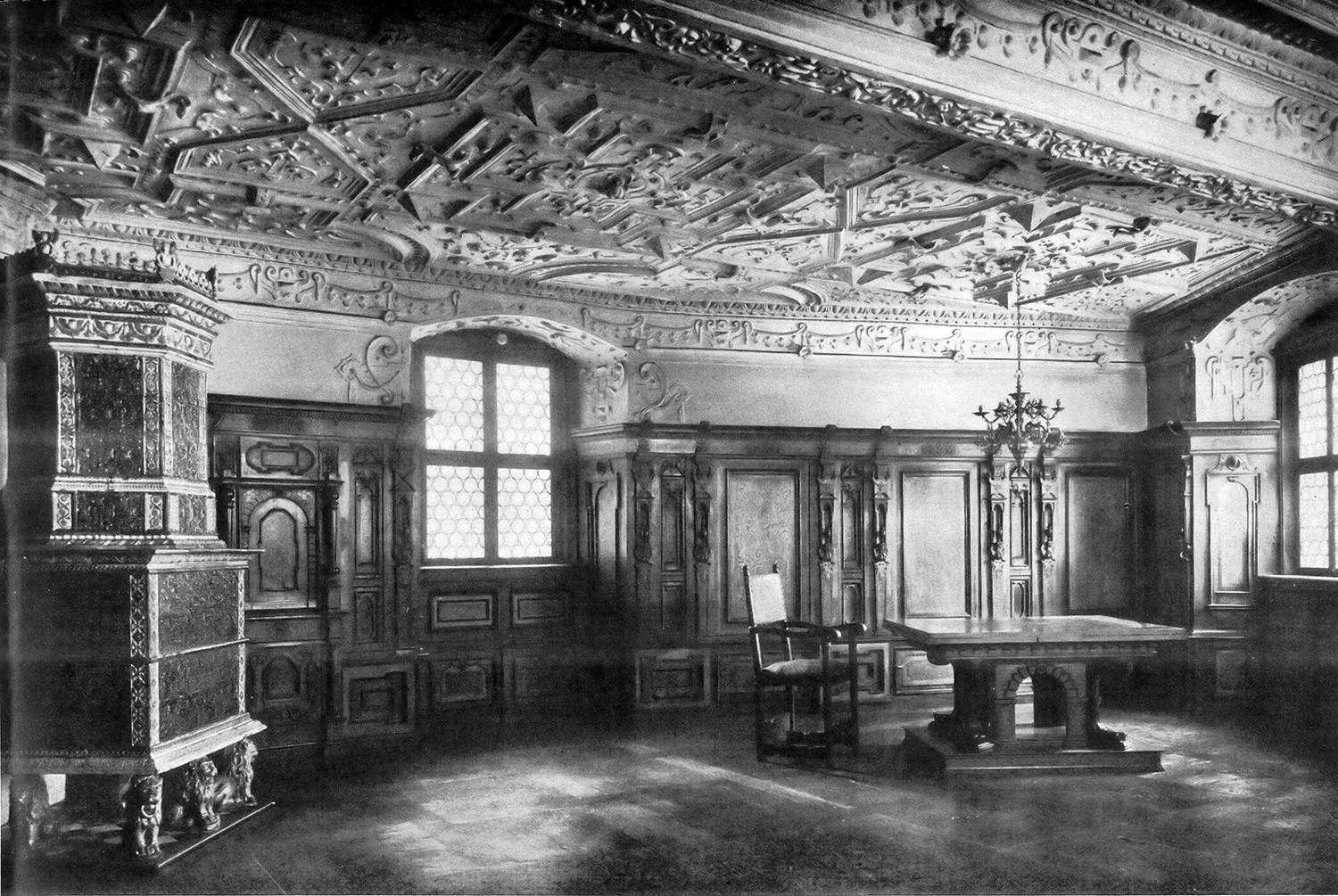
Stucco ceiling and window section of the Knights’ Hall, photo c. 1890

The pentagonal north corner room on the first floor contained one of the most magnificent German Renaissance interiors (created c. 1615, destroyed 1944). It consisted of an elaborate stucco ceiling and complete wood panelling; the room was known as the Rittersaal (because of two dragon-slaying knights depicted in the panelling) or Fürsteneckzimmer.

The modelled stucco ceiling contained no figurative decoration and was skilfully adapted to the room's asymmetry. The panelling (description based on a contemporary source)

The 2 m high panelling is divided into smooth panels veneered with glossy Hungarian ash, separated by peculiar pilasters. Two downward-tapering supports of extremely lively design, widening at the top into two lateral horns adorned with turned knobs and interrupted in the middle by a niche containing a turned baluster, frame a vertically divided panel decorated with rich niche motifs. The richest use of different coloured woods and intarsia throughout gives this architectural division a high chromatic appeal. Curved consoles extending above the main cornice and again adorned with turned knobs terminate the supports upwards.

The window reveals are clad with a simpler and wider niche motif; in the crowning feature are medallions with projecting heads representing the four continents through male and female inhabitants. The frieze running beneath the dentil cornice is decorated with elongated ornamental panels alternately in low relief and intarsia. The socle is correspondingly articulated with intarsia decoration.

At two places the panelling is interrupted by richer groups: on one narrow wall by a washstand and in the middle of the long wall opposite the windows by an extremely elaborate double door. [...] The carved wooden figures crowning the free-standing columns – two dragon-slaying knights and a Fortuna on a globe – are evidently based on motifs by Jost Amman.

—

Two heraldic terracotta plaques with the arms of Dietrich Goßmann and his wife bore the inscription on the reverse: Christianus Steffen possirer und haffner foecit 1615. Christian Steffen, a potter and stucco worker from Langula in Thuringia, is thus confirmed as the creator of at least the plaques and very probably the entire ceiling.

==== Roof storeys ====
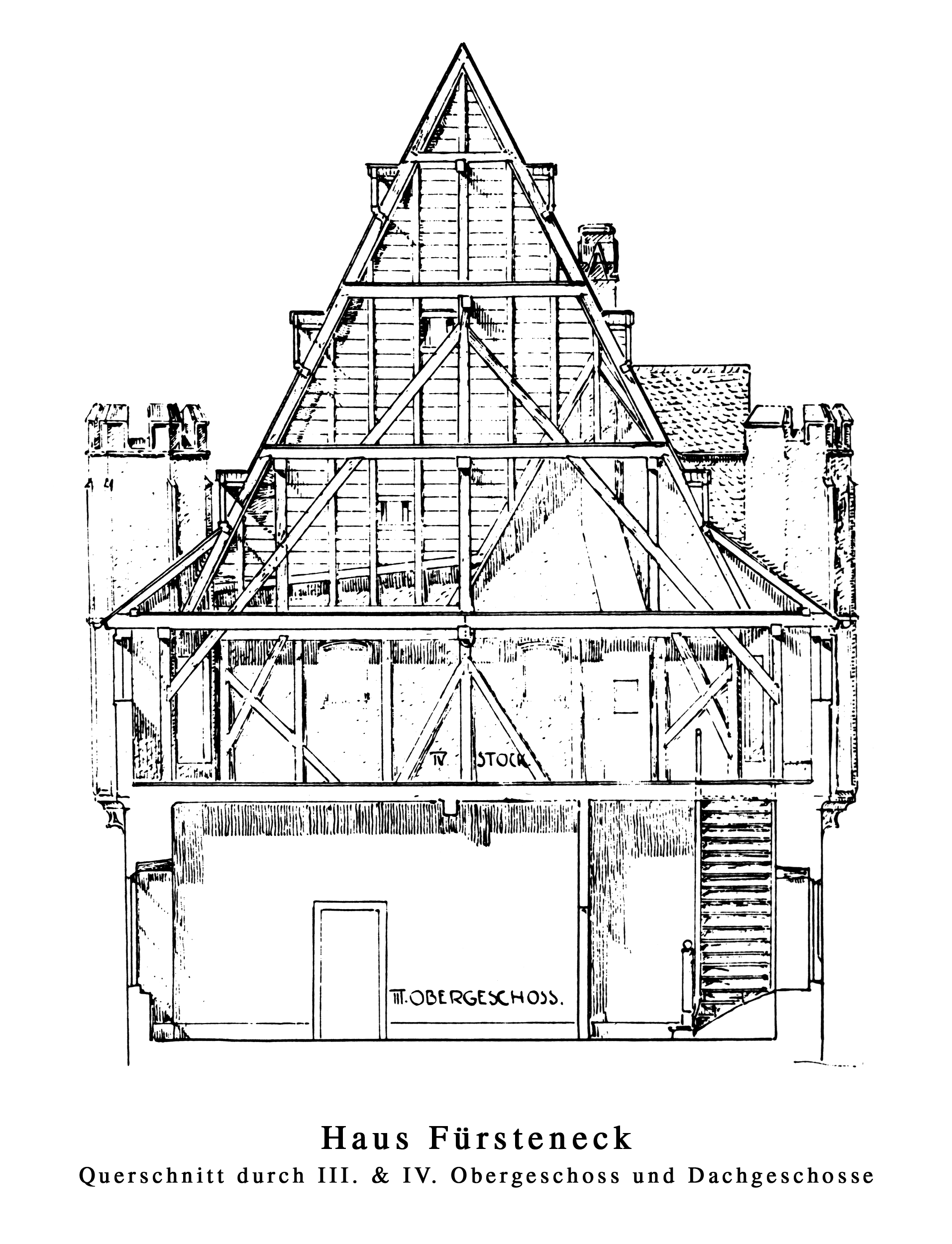
Cross-section of the roof

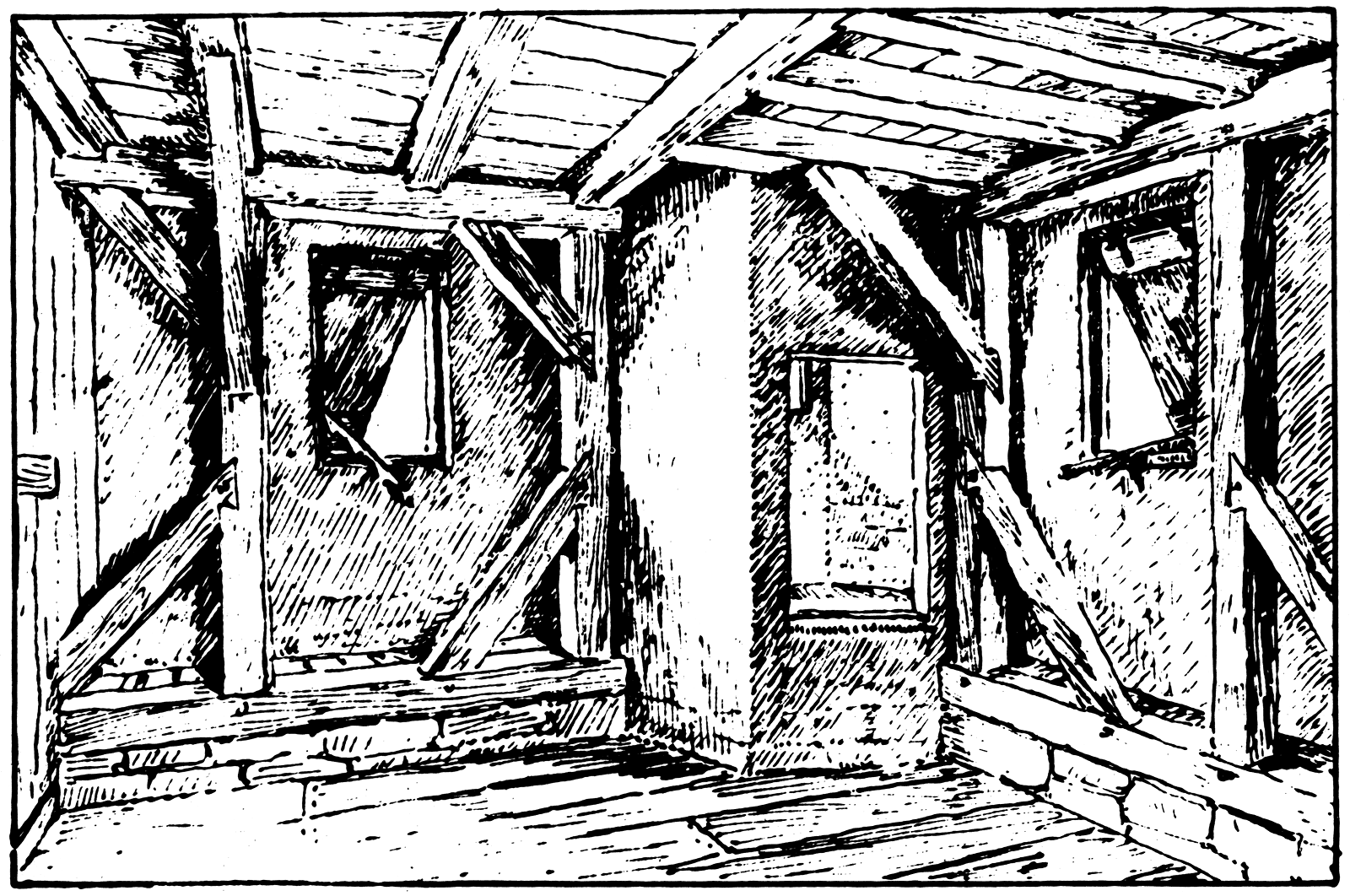
Roof structure of the Tower Zu den drei Sauköpfen, comparable to the Fürsteneck

The staircase ended at the fourth floor, originally a true attic within the gable giving access to the defensive gallery and corner turrets. After the 18th-century alterations it remained a low attic unsuitable for habitation. Three further attic storeys were reached by a simple wooden stair; numerous dormers offered extensive views. Johann Georg Battonn vividly described the special character of these attics and the historic events witnessed from them.

== Bibliography ==
- Johann Georg Batton: Oertliche Beschreibung der Stadt Frankfurt am Main – Band II. Association for History and Archaeology in Frankfurt am Main, Frankfurt am Main 1861–1875
- Architekten- & Ingenieur-Verein (ed.): Frankfurt am Main und seine Bauten. Selbstverlag des Vereins, Frankfurt am Main 1886, pp. 34, 59–62
- Paul Wolff, Fried Lübbecke: Alt-Frankfurt, Neue Folge. Verlag Englert & Schlosser, Frankfurt am Main 1924, pp. 36–39
- Fried Lübbecke: Ein Baudenkmal Altfrankfurts – Das Haus zum Fürsteneck. In: Frankfurter Verkehrsverein (Ed.): Frankfurter Wochenschau. Bodet & Link, Frankfurt am Main 1937, pp. 513–517
- Armin Schmid: Frankfurt im Feuersturm. Verlag Frankfurter Bücher, Frankfurt am Main 1965, pp. 168–171
- Hans Lohne: Frankfurt um 1850. Nach Aquarellen und Beschreibungen von Carl Theodor Reiffenstein und dem Malerischen Plan von Friedrich Wilhelm Delkeskamp. Frankfurt am Main, Verlag Waldemar Kramer 1967, S. 196–199
- Georg Hartmann, Fried Lübbecke: Alt-Frankfurt. Ein Vermächtnis. Verlag Sauer und Auvermann, Glashütten 1971, pp. 301–304
- Manfred Gerner: Fachwerk in Frankfurt am Main. Verlag Waldemar Kramer, Frankfurt 1979, p. 12
- Hartwig Beseler, Niels Gutschow: Kriegsschicksale Deutscher Architektur – Verluste, Schäden, Wiederaufbau – Band 2, Süd. Karl Wachholtz Verlag, Neumünster 1988, p. 820
