= Wilder Graben =

Wilder Graben may refer to following rivers of Thuringia, Germany:

- Wilder Graben (Upper Austria), stream in Northern Limestone Alps, Upper Austria
- Wilder Graben (Nesse), tributary of the Nesse
- Wilder Graben (Seebach), tributary of the Seebach
