= Seebach (Unstrut) =

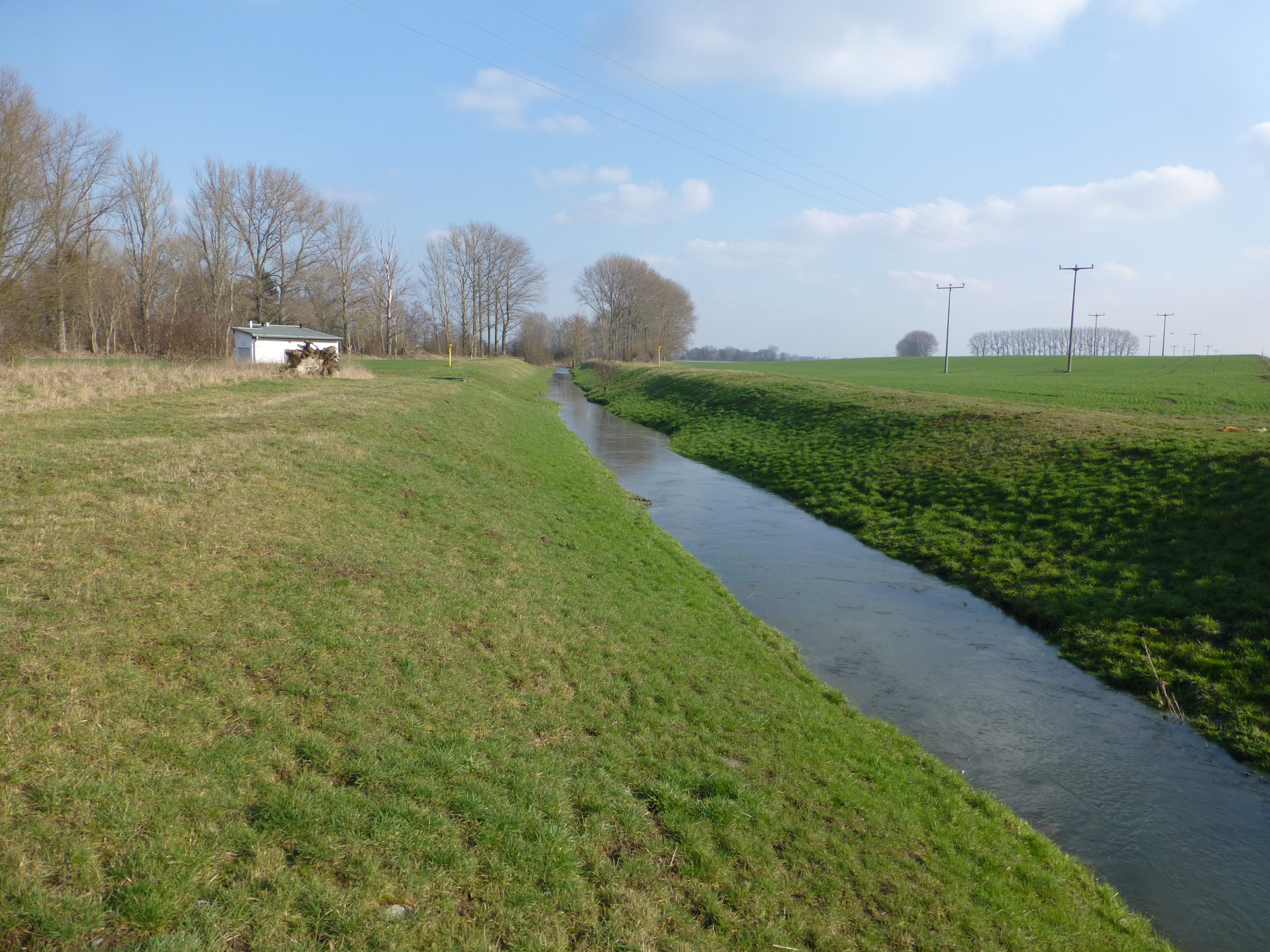

Location
- Country: Germany
- State: Thuringia

Physical characteristics
- Source: Southeast of Niederdorla as confluence of the Mühlbach and the Wilder Graben
  - coordinates: 51.1582°N 10.4610°E
- Mouth: Unstrut
  - coordinates: 51.1660°N 10.5355°E

Basin features
- Progression: Unstrut→ Saale→ Elbe→ North Sea

The Seebach (German pronunciation: [ˈzeːbax]) is a stream of Thuringia, Germany.

The Seebach is formed as the confluence of the two headstreams Mühlbach and Wilder Graben, southeast of Niederdorla. It discharges into the Unstrut in the village Seebach.

== See also ==
- List of rivers of Thuringia
