= Wilder Graben (Seebach) =

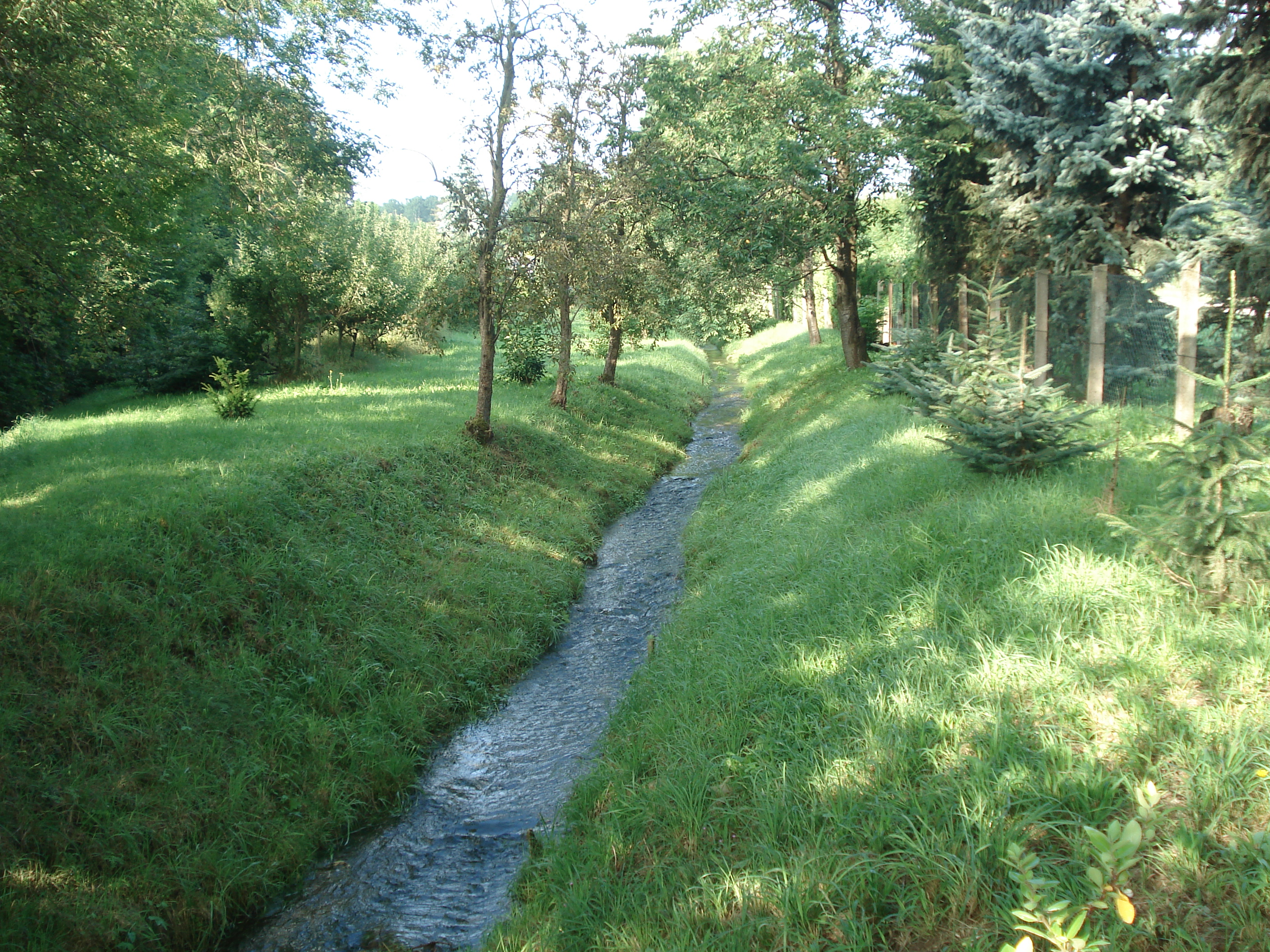

Location
- Country: Germany
- State: Thuringia

Physical characteristics
- Source
  - location: Kainspring, west of Oberdorla
  - coordinates: 51.1598°N 10.4047°E
- Mouth
  - location: Southeast of Niederdorla into the Seebach
  - coordinates: 51.1582°N 10.4610°E

Basin features
- Progression: Seebach→ Unstrut→ Saale→ Elbe→ North Sea

Wilder Graben is a river of Thuringia, Germany.

The Wilder Graben springs from the Kainspring west of Oberdorla. It is a headstream of the Seebach. The confluence with the other headstream, the Mühlbach, is located southeast of Niederdorla.

== See also ==
- List of rivers of Thuringia
