= Matthias Weckmann =

German composer (c. 1616–1674)

- Born: Matthias Weckman c. 1616; Niederdorla, Thuringia
- Died: February 24, 1674 (aged 58); Hamburg
- Occupation: Composer
- Era: Baroque

Matthias Weckmann (or Weckman; c. 1616 – 24 February 1674) was a German musician and composer of the Baroque period. He was born in Niederdorla (Thuringia) and died in Hamburg.

== Life ==
His musical training took place in Dresden (as a chorister at the Saxon Court, under the direction of Heinrich Schütz), then in Hamburg where he worked with the famous organist Jacob Praetorius at the Saint Peter's church (Petrikirche).

He was introduced to the Italian concertato, polychoral and monodic styles — because Schütz had journeyed in Italy when a young man and he had met Giovanni Gabrieli and Monteverdi — as well as the style of Sweelinck's pupils, some of whom had settled in Hamburg. Weckmann travelled to Denmark in 1637 with Schütz, became organist in Dresden at the Electoral Court of Saxony from 1638 to 1642, and returned to Denmark until 1647 (during the Thirty Years' War).

During a new (and his last) stay in Dresden from 1649 to 1655, he met Johann Jakob Froberger during a musical competition which had been organized by the Elector. They remained friends and in correspondence with each other. In 1655, after a competition, he was named titular organist at Saint James church (Jakobkirche) in Hamburg, and spent his remaining life there. He founded a renowned orchestral ensemble, the so-called Collegium Musicum in Hamburg. This was the most productive period of his life: his compositions of this time include a collection of 1663, which set sacred texts mentioning the terrible plague which killed his first wife and many of his colleagues in Hamburg that year, including Heinrich Scheidemann.

He died in Hamburg and was buried in a family grave in St. James's Church beneath the organ.

== Works ==
Weckmann composed chorale preludes and music for the organ and harpsichord that mixes Italian and French influences, various sonatas for three or four instruments, and orchestral and vocal sacred music. Stylistically, he mostly followed the progressive tendencies of Schütz, including the stile concertato and the trend to increasing chromaticism and contrapuntal and motivic complexity. In this regard, he went against the prevailing trends of the time towards simplification, much of which can be seen in Schütz's later music. Weckmann is a good example of a composer whose works would have been completely lost to history, had it not been for the 19th century interest in researching the predecessors of J.S. Bach.

== See also ==
- 7587 Weckmann, an asteroid
