= Vogtei, Thuringia =

Vogtei
- Municipality
- Coat of arms

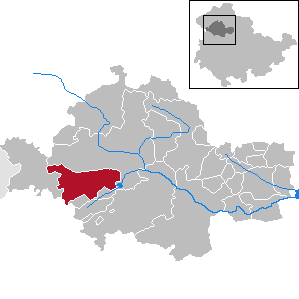
- Location of Vogtei within Unstrut-Hainich-Kreis district
- Interactive map of Vogtei
- Location within Germany Location within Thuringia
- Coordinates: 51°10′N 10°27′E
- Country: Germany
- State: Thuringia
- District: Unstrut-Hainich-Kreis
- Subdivisions: 3 villages (Ortsteile)

Area
  - Total: 49.57 km^{2} (19.14 sq mi)
- Elevation: 227 m (745 ft)

Population (2025-12-31)
  - Total: 4,180
  - Density: 84.3/km^{2} (218/sq mi)
- Time zone: UTC+01:00 (CET)
  - Summer (DST): UTC+02:00 (CEST)
- Postal codes: 99986
- Dialling codes: 03601
- Vehicle registration: UH
- Website: www.gemeinde-vogtei.de

Vogtei (German pronunciation: [foːkˈtaɪ]) is a municipality in the Unstrut-Hainich-Kreis district of Thuringia, Germany. It was formed on 31 December 2012 by the merger of the former municipalities of Langula, Niederdorla, and Oberdorla. The closest town and the only one that it borders is Mühlhausen northerly. The Hainich National Park is situated westerly.

== Geographical centre of Germany ==
One of the possible geographical centres of Germany lies in Vogtei; there is a plaque at 51°9′48.15″N 10°26′51.66″E, c. 500 m (1,600 ft) to the north of the centre of Niederdorla.

== See also ==
- Central Germany (geography)
