= Carl Theodor Reiffenstein =

German painter (1820–1893)

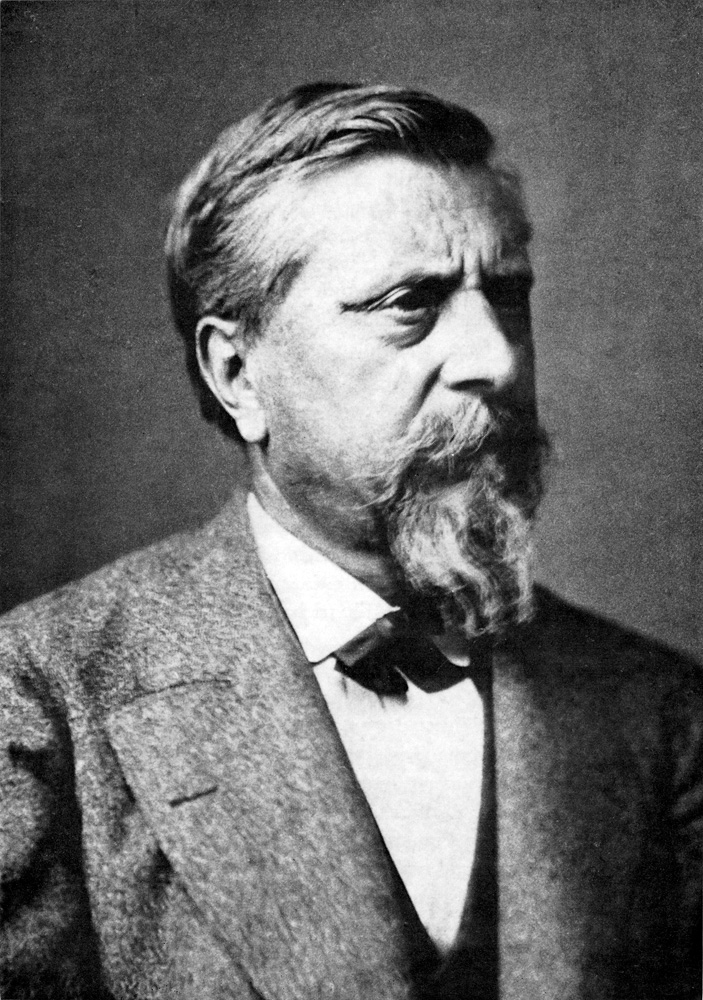
Carl Theodor Reiffenstein, c. 1880

Carl Theodor Reiffenstein (12 January 1820, Frankfurt am Main – 6 December 1893, Frankfurt am Main) was a German landscape and architecture painter who created an invaluable historical record of Frankfurt am Main.

== Education ==
His father was a brewer and he grew up in a part of the city that largely retained its Medieval character.

His father wanted Carl to take his place as proprietor of the family tavern, but Carl displayed a precocious interest in art, so a live-in drawing tutor was obtained. In 1828, he and his teacher took a trip around Hofheim, Lorsbach and Eppstein. Reiffenstein would later declare that trip to be the most important factor in determining the direction of his career. By 1830, he was already sufficiently advanced to gain paid employment, hand coloring lithographs and prints.

He continued his studies with several other teachers and taught himself from books. At the age of thirteen, with his father's permission, he enrolled at the Städelschule under Friedrich Maximilian Hessemer. Initially, he planned to become an architect but found that he was more interested in Hessemer's architectural drawings so he switched to painting, with Heinrich von Rustige as instructor. When he left the school in 1846, he engaged in several study trips, ranging from Paris to Bohemia and Italy.

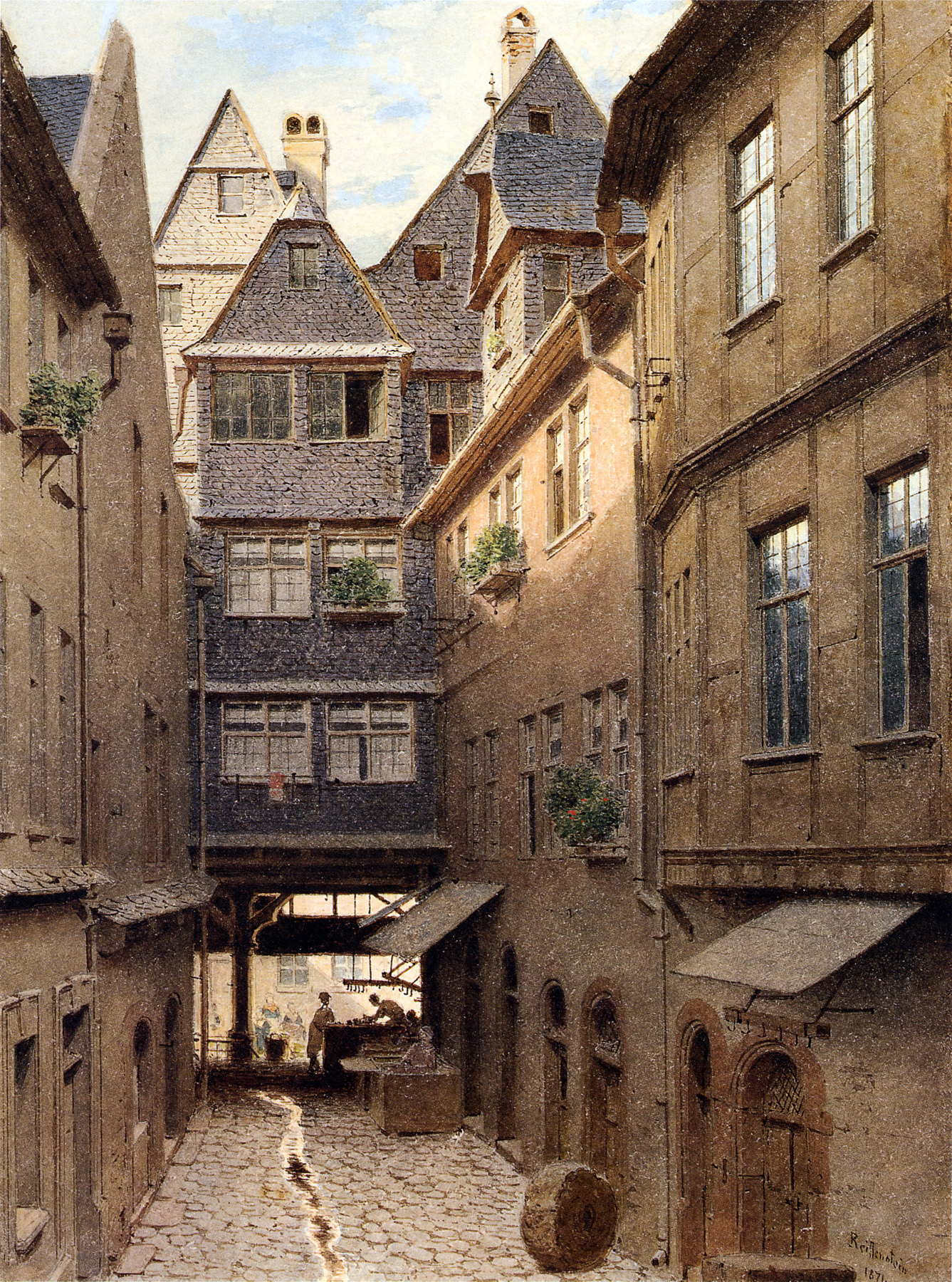
Tuchgaden (1862)

== Career ==
He soon achieved great success as a painter and, in 1858, became a corresponding member of the "Cercle Artistique" in Ghent. He was awarded the Medal for Art at the World Exposition, Vienna, in 1873. His evocative landscapes earned him the nickname "Malenden Dichters" (The Painting Poet). Many of his commissions came from the Rhein-Main region, but he also received an order from Amorbach destined for Queen Victoria in memory of her step-brother, Prince Karl von Leiningen.

For many years, he was a board member of the "Vereins für Geschichte und Altertumskunde" (Association for History and Archaeology) in his hometown. In this capacity, he was involved in the effort to preserve the Goethe House, acting as treasurer for donations and contributions and instrumental in arranging its purchase by the "Freies Deutsches Hochstift" in 1863.

In 1867, he married the daughter of a wine merchant. The marriage was childless, and his wife acted as a sort of secretary, organizing and cataloguing his works. After his wife's death in 1892, he suffered a stroke that paralyzed his right side. When he appeared to be recovering, he came down with a kidney ailment, then influenza. He died near the end of 1893 and was buried in the Hauptfriedhof. A Plaza in Frankfurt has been named after him.

== Work ==
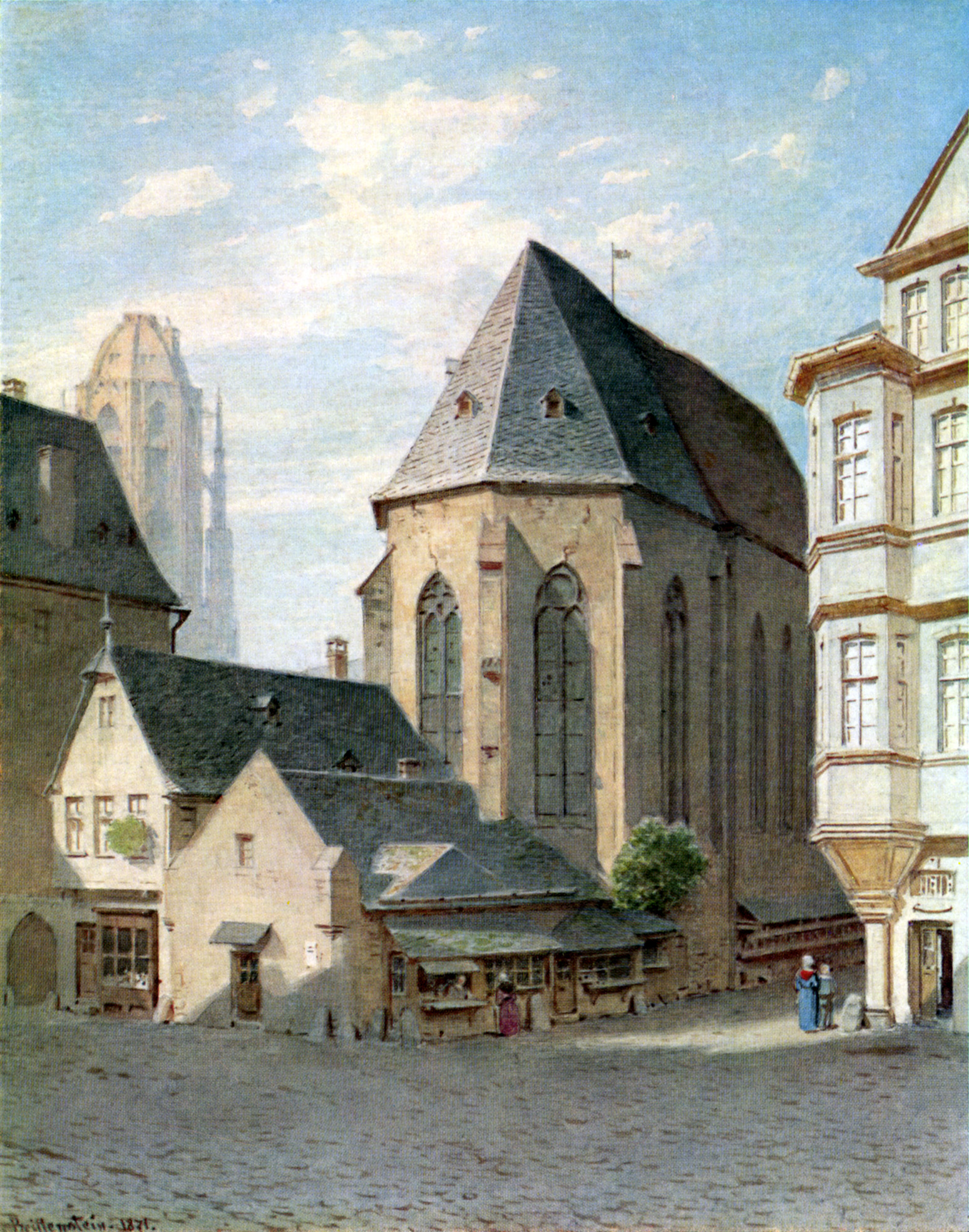
St.John's Church (1871). A reconstruction of the way it would have appeared in 1845.

It is difficult to make a full assessment of his surviving works, as they are widely dispersed in private collections. His known works number over 2,000 (mostly watercolors). It is estimated that if one includes study sheets, sketches etc., that the number would exceed 10,000. The Städelschule alone possesses forty-three volumes of study sheets.

As early as the 1830s, the character of the Altstadt in Frankfurt had begun to change, largely due to what were intended as hygienic improvements. Beginning in the 1850s, he would wander through the area making sketches; sometimes only days before the buildings were razed to make way for new structures or streets. When he was too late, he would make use of every possible resource to reconstruct the scene. He compiled a seven volume work with over 1,600 images and 2,600 pages of extensive notes on architectural details, suspected changes, owners and the age of buildings throughout the Altstadt. These volumes were bequeathed to the Historical Museum and have yet to be fully published, although many of the images have been used; notably in an edition of Goethe's Dichtung und Wahrheit.
