= Langula =

- Ortsteil of Vogtei
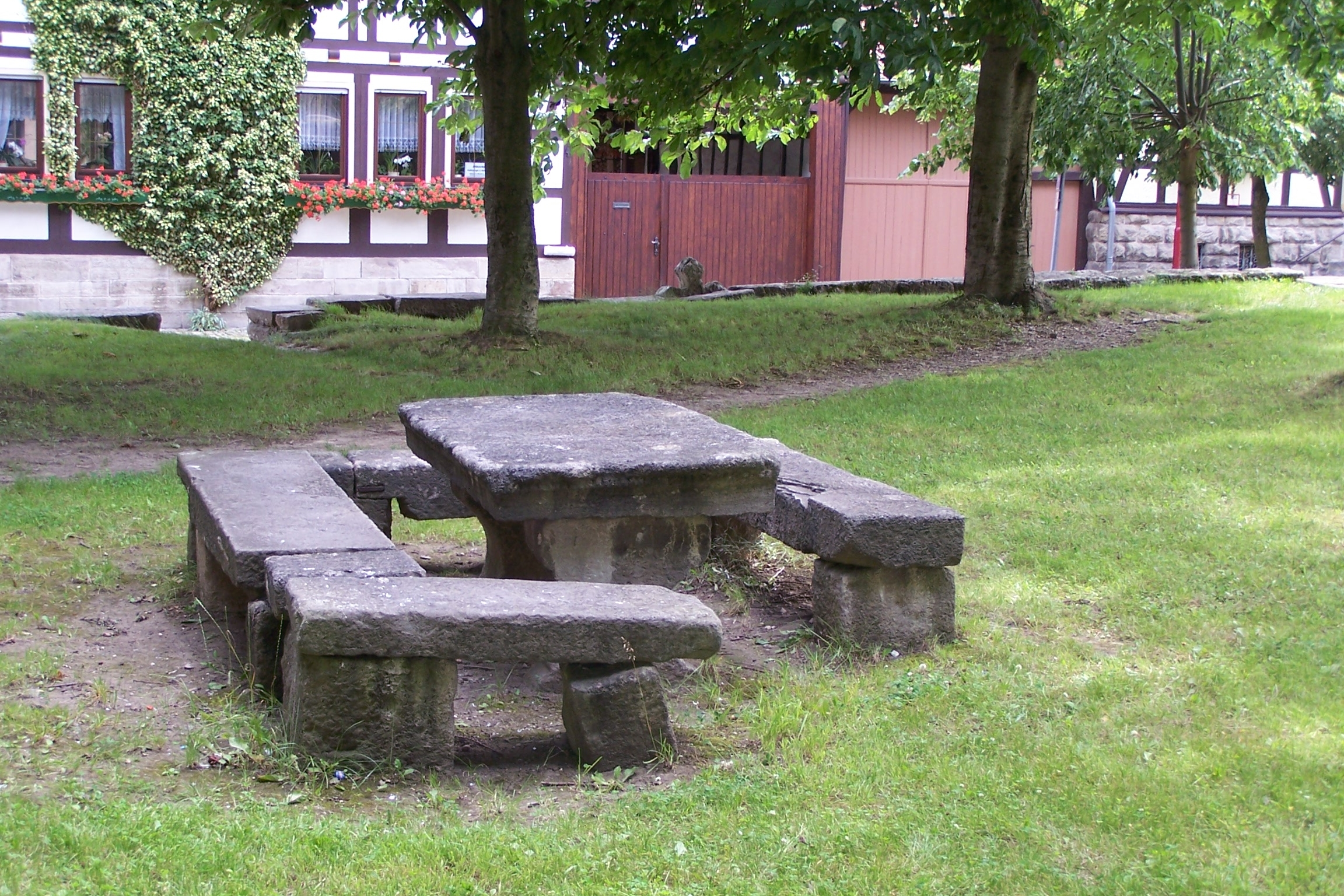

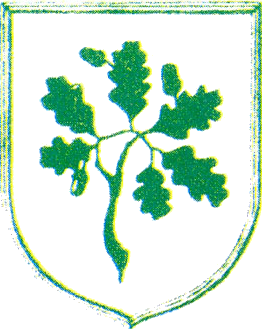
- Coat of arms
- Interactive map of Langula
- Location within Germany Location within Thuringia
- Coordinates: 51°9′N 10°25′E
- Country: Germany
- State: Thuringia
- District: Unstrut-Hainich-Kreis
- Municipality: Vogtei

Area
  - Total: 15.16 km^{2} (5.85 sq mi)
- Elevation: 236 m (774 ft)

Population (2011-12-31)
  - Total: 1,037
  - Density: 68.40/km^{2} (177.2/sq mi)
- Time zone: UTC+01:00 (CET)
  - Summer (DST): UTC+02:00 (CEST)
- Postal codes: 99986
- Dialling codes: 03601
- Vehicle registration: UH
- Website: www.gemeinde-vogtei.de

Langula (German pronunciation: [ˈlaŋɡuːla]) is a village and a former municipality in the Unstrut-Hainich-Kreis district of Thuringia, Germany. Since 31 December 2012, it is part of the municipality of Vogtei.
