= Oberdorla =

- Ortsteil of Vogtei
- Interactive map of Oberdorla
- Location within Germany Location within Thuringia
- Coordinates: 51°10′0″N 10°25′10″E
- Country: Germany
- State: Thuringia
- District: Unstrut-Hainich-Kreis
- Municipality: Vogtei

Area
  - Total: 19.7 km^{2} (7.6 sq mi)
- Elevation: 227 m (745 ft)

Population (2011-12-31)
  - Total: 2,105
  - Density: 107/km^{2} (277/sq mi)
- Time zone: UTC+01:00 (CET)
  - Summer (DST): UTC+02:00 (CEST)
- Postal codes: 99986
- Dialling codes: 03601
- Vehicle registration: UH

Oberdorla (German pronunciation: [ˈoːbɐˌdɔʁla], lit. 'Upper Dorla', in contrast to "Lower Dorla") is a village and a former municipality in the Unstrut-Hainich-Kreis district of Thuringia, Germany. Since 31 December 2012, it is part of the municipality Vogtei.
