= Conrad Faber von Kreuznach =

German painter

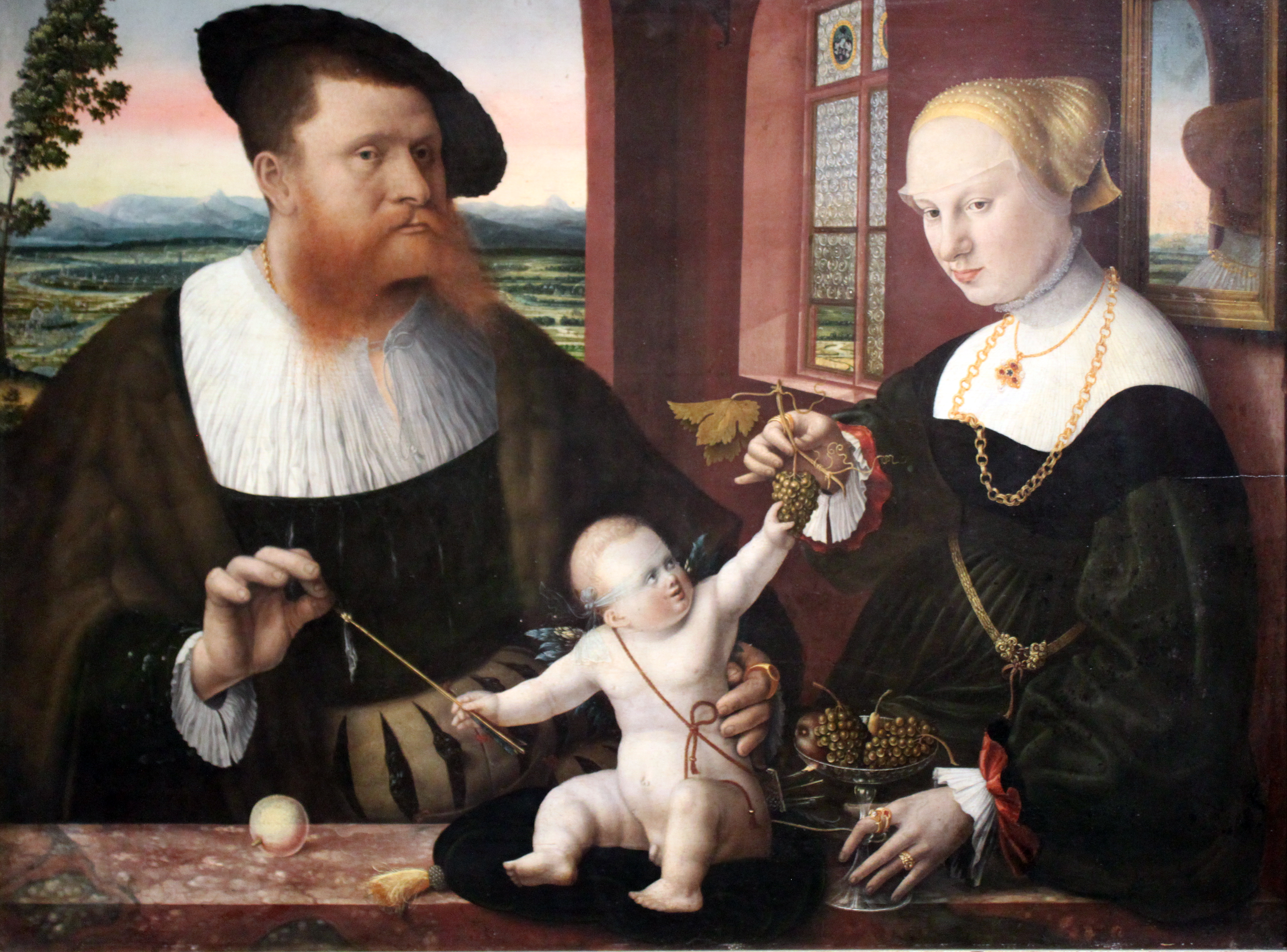
Portrait of Justinian von Holzhausen (1502-1553) and his Wife Anna (1510-1573), 1536

Conrad Faber von Kreuznach (c. 1500 in Kreuznach, Germany – between 10 September 1552 and 15 May 1553 in Frankfurt am Main) was a German painter and woodcuts designer formerly known as Master of Holzhausen-portraits.

== Life ==
Little is known about his life prior to 1524. It is believed that Conrad Faber von Kreuznach worked as a wood carver and illustrator for publisher Peter Schöffer, who had previously been employed by Johannes Gutenberg. The first recorded mention of Conrad Kreuznach is found dating from 1526 where he is mentioned as a journeyman in the workshop of Hans Fyoll from Frankfurt. At the beginning of the Reformation just like many other artists deprived of their main source of income, Faber experienced a debt ridden life with modest commissioned works. Nothing is known about his first marriage. His second marriage was on 18 July 1537 to Catherine, a daughter of a wool weaver. Catherine was a citizen of Frankfurt and Faber got the citizenship of Frankfurt on 27 March 1538 because of his marriage to Catherine. In 1546 Faber's only son Louis was born. His son was named after the child's godfather Martorff Ludwig, whose portrait by Faber is included as part of his Frankfurt works.

In his later years Faber created several significant topographical works including the template view of Frankfurt in Sebastian Münster's Cosmographia (1550) Faber died probably around the spring of 1553. He left with 400 guilders debt, while for all his extensive works on the plan of the city Frankfurt am Main his widow was paid only 50 guilders by the city council. Catherine married Faber's fellow painter Jacob Laßmann on 6 November 1553 while she sent her seven-year-old son Louis for further education to her step father and her mother in northern Hesse. Catherine died in 1558 while her son Louis was thirteen years old. He inherited his father Conrad Faber's works and house and debts.

== Works ==
Conrad Faber von Kreuznach's early works include illustrations that were published by the publisher Peter Schöffer between 1517-1522. In the 420 pages of the issue there are 153 Faber woodcuts and collaborations with other fellow workers for 250 pictures. Faber's works stand out as lively illustrations. Faber used sketches of Middle Rhine and Rhineland cities that he had made during his travels to make illustrations of ancient Greek Sieges while he depicted Princes of his time as ancient Roman warlords. A large number of the paintings by Conrad Faber are portraits of wealthy clients and also Landscapes and Cityscapes. He depicted the costumes of patrons with lavish and colourful detail. His paintings were signed as 'CVC' (Conrad von Creuznach).

Conrad Faber von Kreuznach is particularly noted for his 1535 portrait works of Gilbrecht von Holzhausen and his wife Anna Ratzeburger. In the background of this picture the city of Frankfurt am Main is depicted with a bird's eye perspective. This makes the picture one of the earliest known depiction of the city. His main work include the portrait of Justinian and Anna von Holzhausen (1536). In 1547 he designed a tapestry for Ogier von Melem the grandson of Johann von Melem. His last work is a woodcut depicting Frankfurt during the siege of 1552.

== See also ==
- Renaissance
- German Renaissance
- Northern Renaissance

== References and bibliography ==
- Wolfgang Brücker (1959). "Faber von Creuznach, Conrad (früher Meister der Holzhausen-Bildnisse genannt, signierte mit dem Monogramm CVC". Neue Deutsche Biographie (in German). Vol. 4. Berlin: Duncker & Humblot. pp. 721–722. (full text online).
- Wolfgang Brücker: Conrad Faber von Creuznach. Schriften des Historischen Museums Frankfurt am Main, 11, Verlag Waldemar Kramer, Frankfurt am Main 1963

== Gallery ==
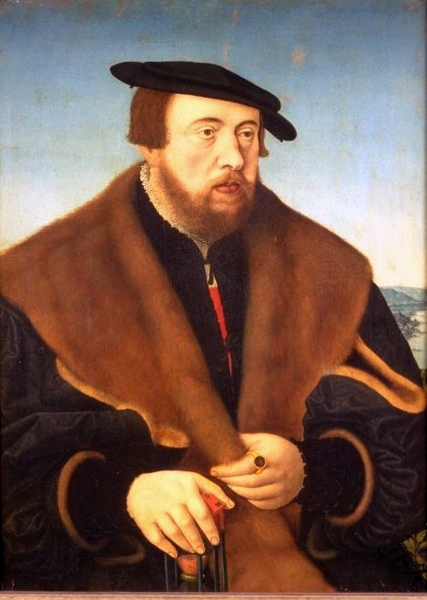
Portrait of Johann von Glauburg (1503–1571); oil on wood

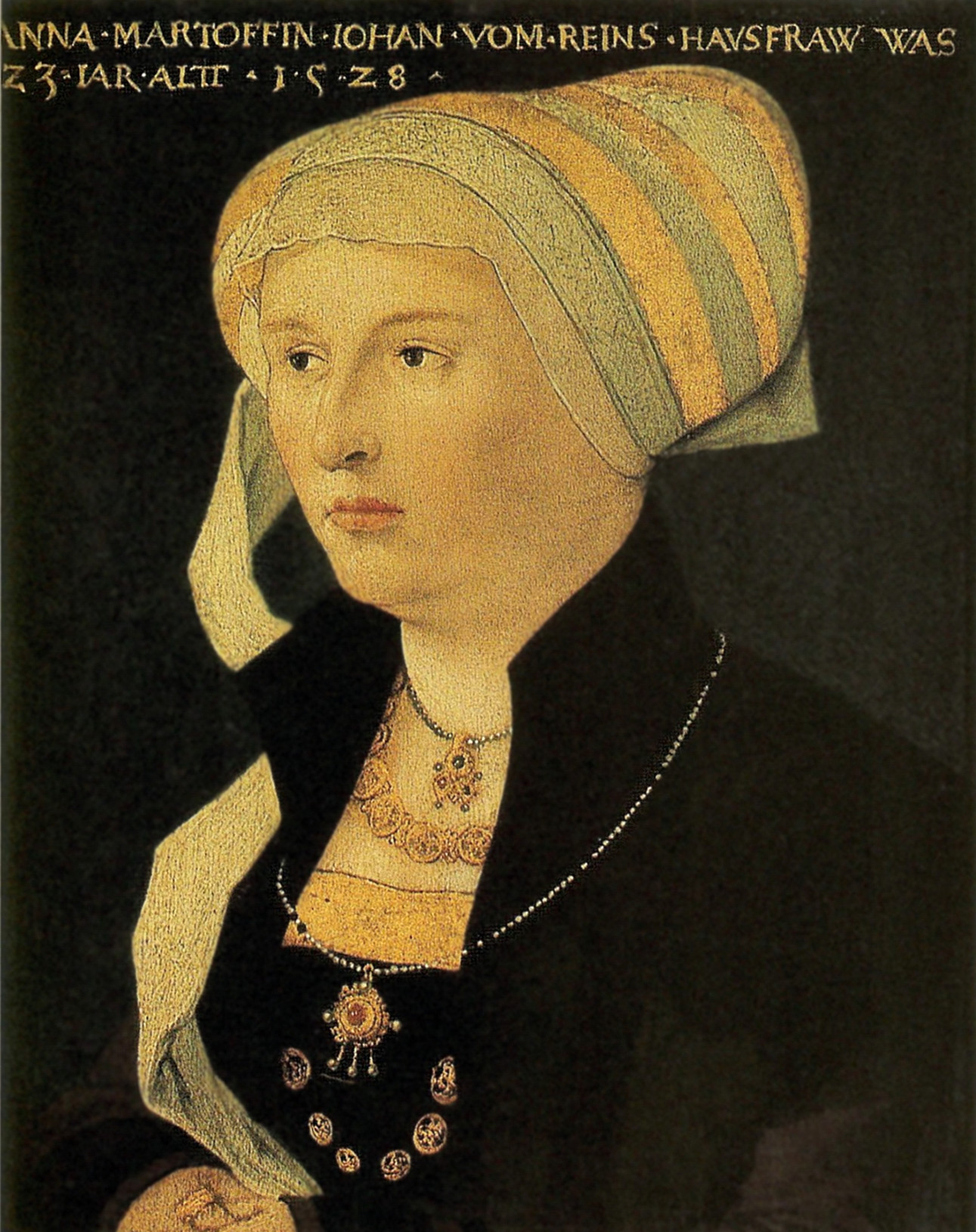
Portrait of Anna Martoffin

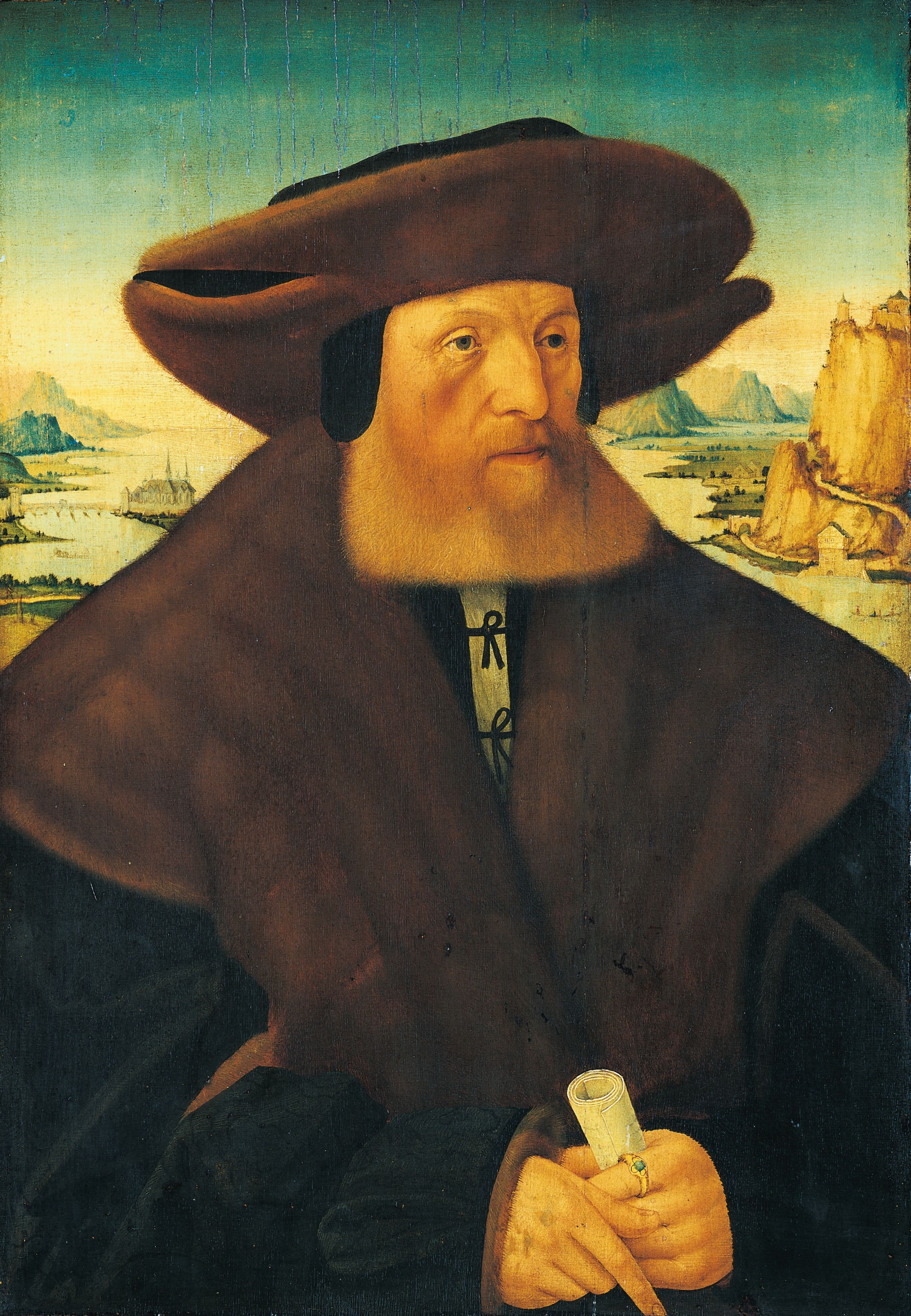
A (1529) portrait of Hamman von Holzhausen (1467-1536), A Patron and Humanist from Frankfurt

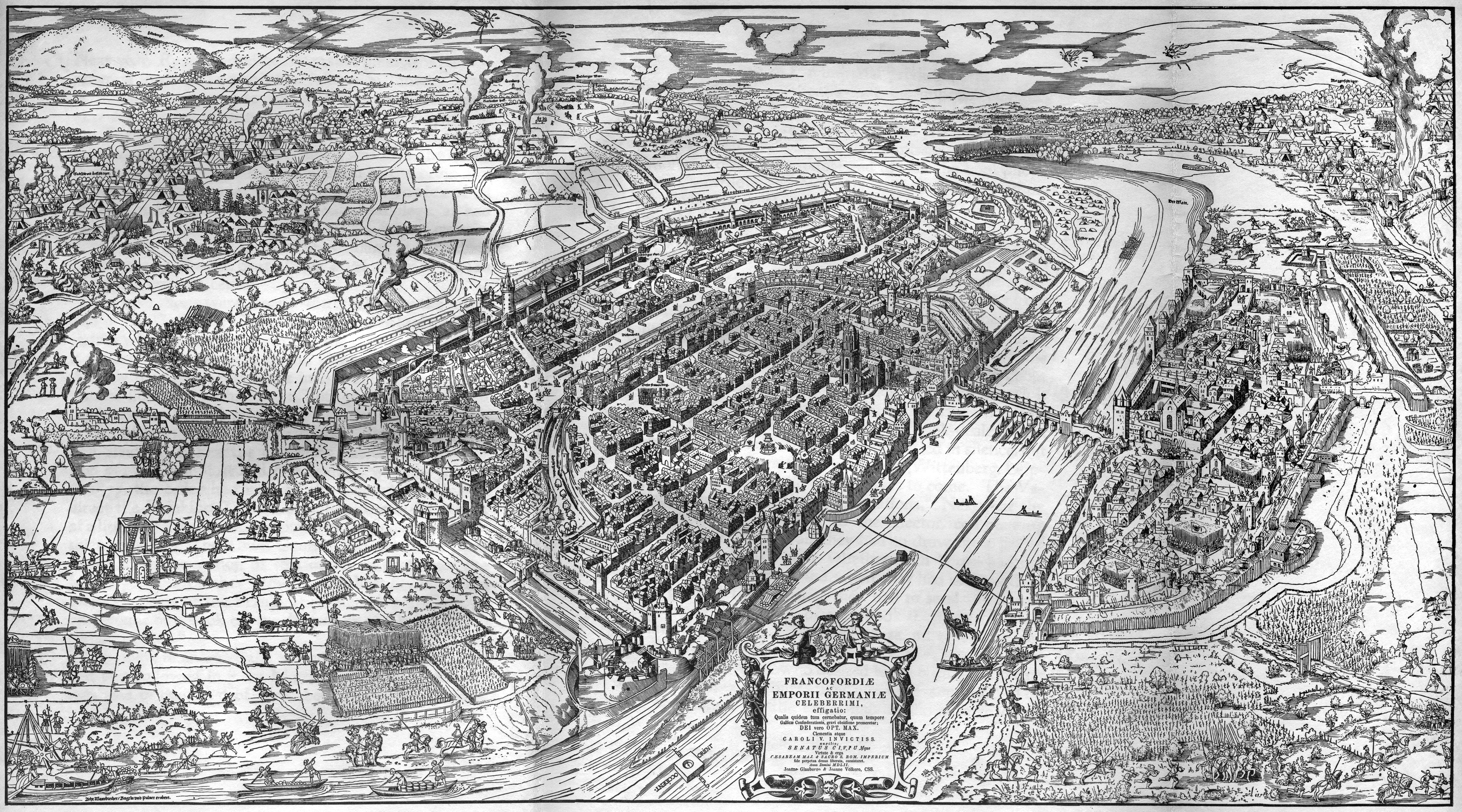
Complete plan of Frankfurt am Main (1552)

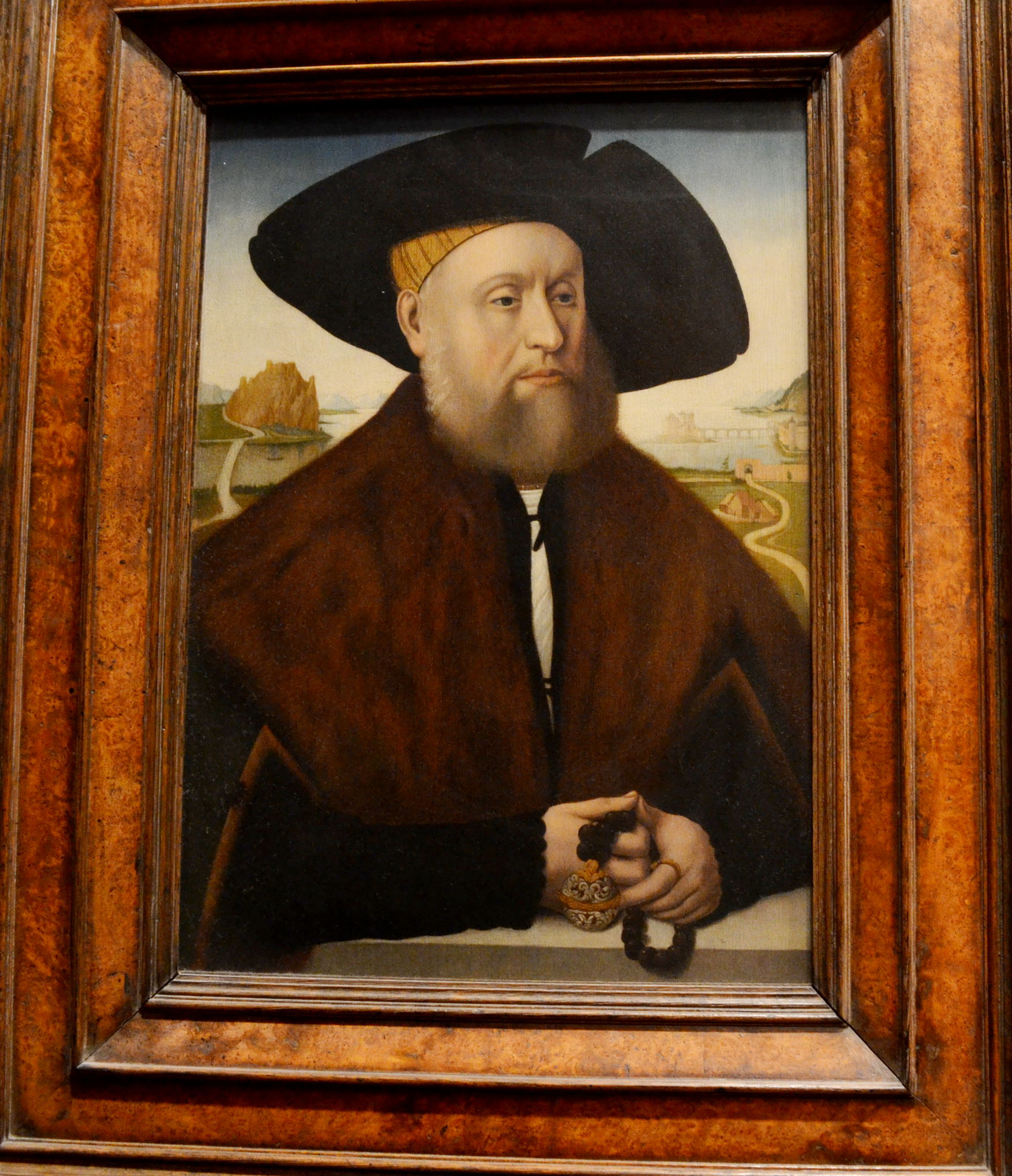
Portrait of a member of the vom Rhein Family' (late 1520s), oil and gold on wood
