= Niederdorla =

- Ortsteil of Vogtei
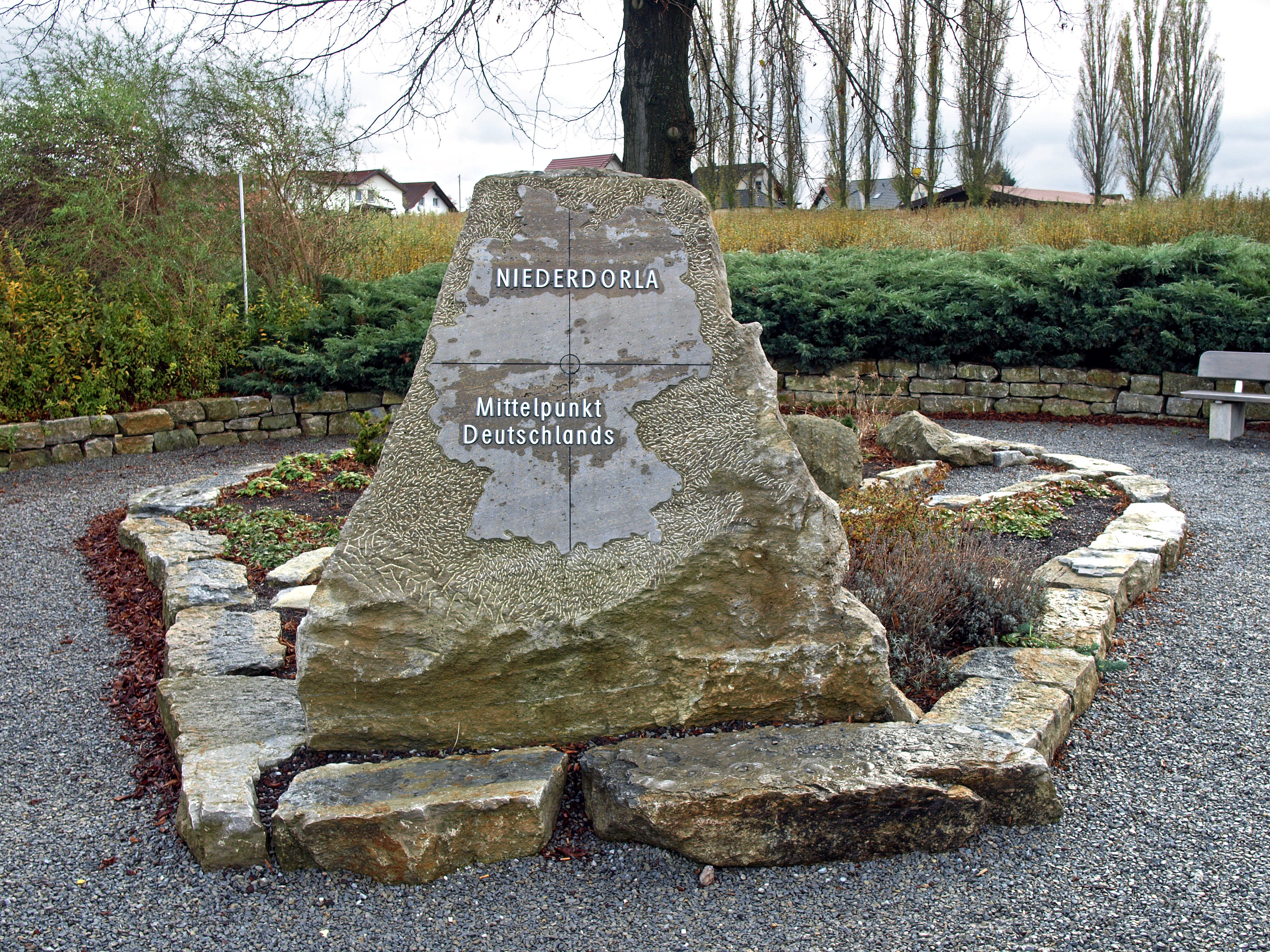
- Monument marking the village's status as the geographical centre of Germany

- Coat of arms
- Interactive map of Niederdorla
- Location within Germany Location within Thuringia
- Coordinates: 51°09′39″N 10°26′56″E
- Country: Germany
- State: Thuringia
- District: Unstrut-Hainich-Kreis
- Municipality: Vogtei

Area
  - Total: 14.64 km^{2} (5.65 sq mi)
- Elevation: 203 m (666 ft)

Population (2011-12-31)
  - Total: 1,352
  - Density: 92.35/km^{2} (239.2/sq mi)
- Time zone: UTC+01:00 (CET)
  - Summer (DST): UTC+02:00 (CEST)
- Postal codes: 99986
- Dialling codes: 03601
- Vehicle registration: UH
- Website: www.gemeinde-vogtei.de

Niederdorla (German pronunciation: [ˈniːdɐˌdɔʁla], lit. 'Lower Dorla', in contrast to "Upper Dorla") is a village and a former municipality in the Unstrut-Hainich-Kreis district of Thuringia, Germany. One of the possible geographical centres of Germany is within its area. The nearest city is Erfurt, which also is the capital city of Thuringia. Since 31 December 2012, it has been part of the municipality of Vogtei.

== Geographical centre of Germany ==
Niederdorla claims to be the most central municipality in Germany. A plaque was erected and a lime tree planted at 51°9′48.15″N 10°26′51.66″E after the 1990 German reunification. The point was confirmed as the centroid of the extreme coordinates by the Dresden University of Technology. Niederdorla also comprises the centre of gravity (equilibrium point) about 4.5 km (2.8 mi) to the southwest.

== People from Niederdorla ==
- Matthias Weckmann, born c. 1616 in Niederdorla, died 1674 in Hamburg, Baroque organist and composer

== See also ==
- Central Germany (geography)
