= Unstrut-Hainich (Verwaltungsgemeinschaft) =

Municipal association in Thuringia, Germany

Coordinates: 51.133°N 10.567°E

Unstrut-Hainich is a former Verwaltungsgemeinschaft in the district of Unstrut-Hainich-Kreis in Thuringia, Germany. The seat of the Verwaltungsgemeinschaft was in Großengottern. It was disbanded in January 2019.

The Verwaltungsgemeinschaft Unstrut-Hainich consisted of the following municipalities:

1. Altengottern
2. Flarchheim
3. Großengottern
4. Heroldishausen
5. Mülverstedt
6. Schönstedt
7. Weberstedt
