= Felix Friedrich =

German organist, church musician and musicologist

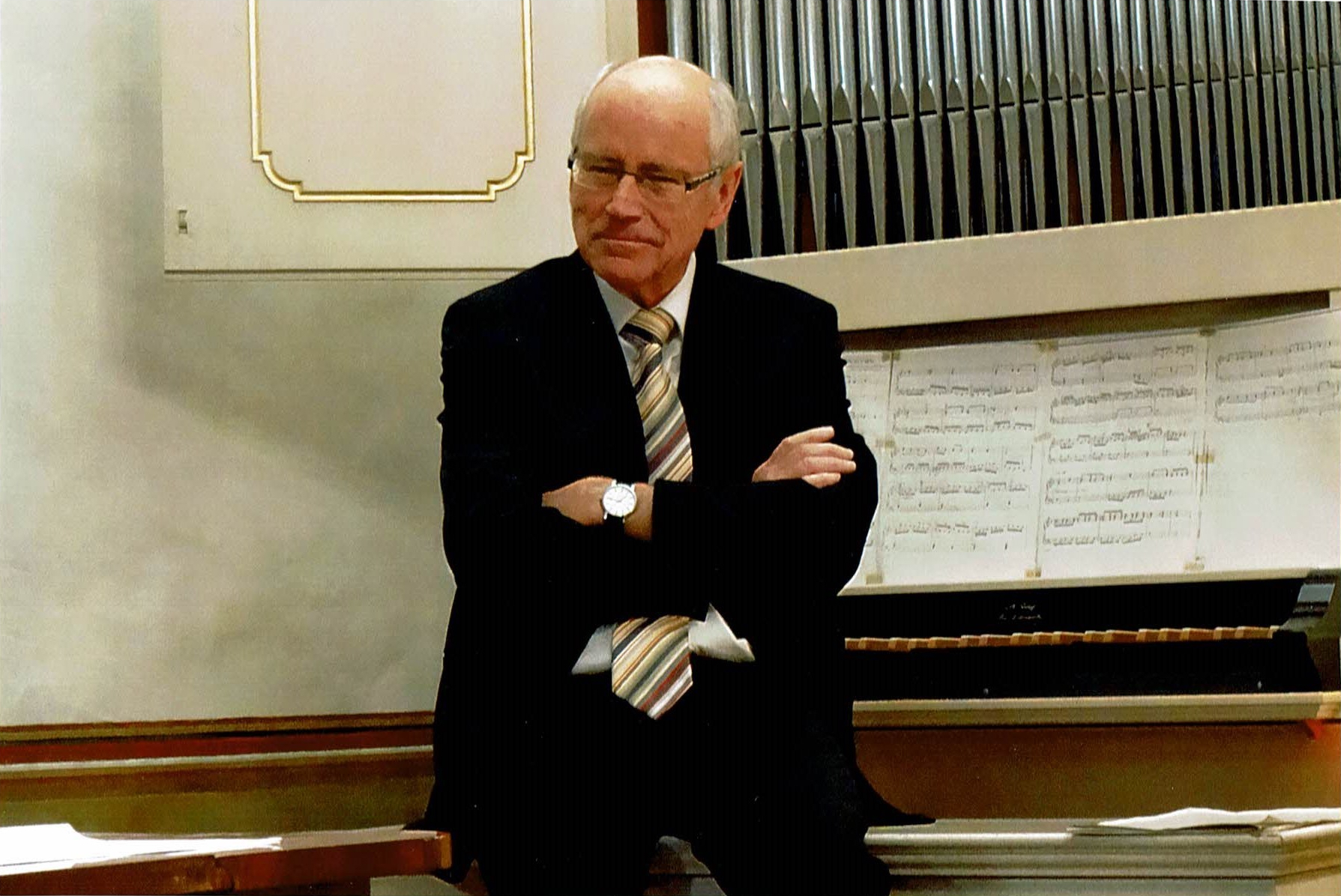
Image of Felix Friedrich

Felix Friedrich (born 1945) is a German organist, church musician and musicologist.

== Life ==
Friedrich was born in 1945 in Hochweitzschen near Döbeln. He studied church music and organ in Dresden and Weimar. In 1976 he was appointed organist at the organ of Tobias Heinrich Gottfried Trost of the Schlosskirche Altenburg. An extensive concert activity led him so far into all European countries as well as into the former USSR and into the USA. He has performed with great success at international music festivals: Salzburg Festival, International Congress of Organists in Cambridge, AGO-Convention Detroit among others.

Numerous radio, television and disc recordings were produced with him. So far he has released over 80 CDs. He is particularly committed to Neue Musik and has given over 50 world premieres. As a soloist he regularly performs with major orchestras and conductors (among others Marek Janowski, Fabio Luisi, Kurt Masur, Helmuth Rilling, Peter Schreier).

In 1987 he received his doctorate from the Martin Luther University of Halle-Wittenberg. Musicological work is an important part of his artistic work. Since 1991 he has been the director of the "Thüringische Orgelakademie". For the CD edition of all organs by Gottfried Silbermann he was awarded the Annual Prize of the German Record Critics 2003 and in 2006 the Culture Prize of the City of Altenburg together with Klaus-Jürgen Kamprad's querstand publishing house.

== Publications ==
- Der Orgelbauer Heinrich Gottfried Trost. Wiesbaden 1989.
- Johann Ludwig Krebs. Leben und Werk. Altenburg 1988.
- Die Orgel im Exlibris. Altenburg 2002
- Orgeln im Altenburger Land. Altenburg 1994
- Thematisch-systematisches Verzeichnis der musikalischen Werke von Johann Ludwig Krebs (Krebs-WV). Altenburg 2009
- Felix Friedrich an den Orgeln in Bad Lausick, Rötha/St. Marien, Schweikershain und Glauchau.
- Numerous articles in MGG und New Grove

== Annotated editions ==
- Charles-Marie Widor: Symphonie Gothique for organ, Six Duos for organ and piano, Variations de Concert sur un thème original for piano. Schott Music Mainz.
- Bedřich Smetana: Organ works. Dr. J. Butz-Musikverlag Bonn.
- Johann Ludwig Krebs, organ, piano and chamber music. Carus-Verlag Stuttgart and Noetzel-Verlag Wilhelmshaven.
- Ottorino Respighi: Suite for organ and orchestra. Dr. J. Butz-Musikverlag Bonn.
- B-A-C-H - Fugues for organ from the late 18th century. Dr. J. Butz-Musikverlag Bonn.
- Johann Pachelbel: Organ works. Schott Music Mainz.

== Recordings ==
- Silbermann organs in Vogtland - Mylau and Reichenbach. Motet Ursina
- Johann Ludwig Krebs: Organ Works. Berlin Classics
- Johann Sebastian Bach: Organ works. Capriccio/Delta
- Johann Sebastian Bach: Clavier- Practice Part III Motette Ursina
- Edvard Grieg. Peer Gynt. Philips
- Johann Ludwig Krebs: Complete works for organ. 11 CD. (querstand)
- New organ music from Scandinavia and Central Europe. querstand
- Musical instruments in Bachhaus Eisenach. Aarton
- The organs of Tobias Heinrich Gottfried Trost. crosswise
- The organs of Zacharias Hildebrandt. crosswise
- Organ and piano, organ and orchestra. (querstand)
- Siegfried Steinkogler: Organ Works. ORF

== World premieres ==
- Howard Arman: Seine Linke liegt unter meiner Schulter
- Henry Berthold: Concerto for organ and orchestra
- Jean-Luc Darbellay: Cantus for horn and organ
- Jörg Herchet: orgelkomposition 4
- Kurt A. Hueber: Memento mori
- Georg Katzer: Missa profana for organ and Sound house for orchestra and organ
- Maximilian Kreuz: Kyrie eleison und Agnus Dei
- Achim Müller-Weinberg: Warten auf G.... concert for organ and Orchestra
- Friedrich Schenker: Michelangelo-Sinfonie for choir, orchestra, speaker and organ
- Siegfried Thiele: Suite for organ
- Karl Ottomar Treibmann: Trostmusik
- Günther Witschurke: Hommage à Johann Ludwig Krebs
- Ruth Zechlin: Verkündigung
