= Seebach, Mühlhausen =

Seebach
- Ortsteil of Mühlhausen
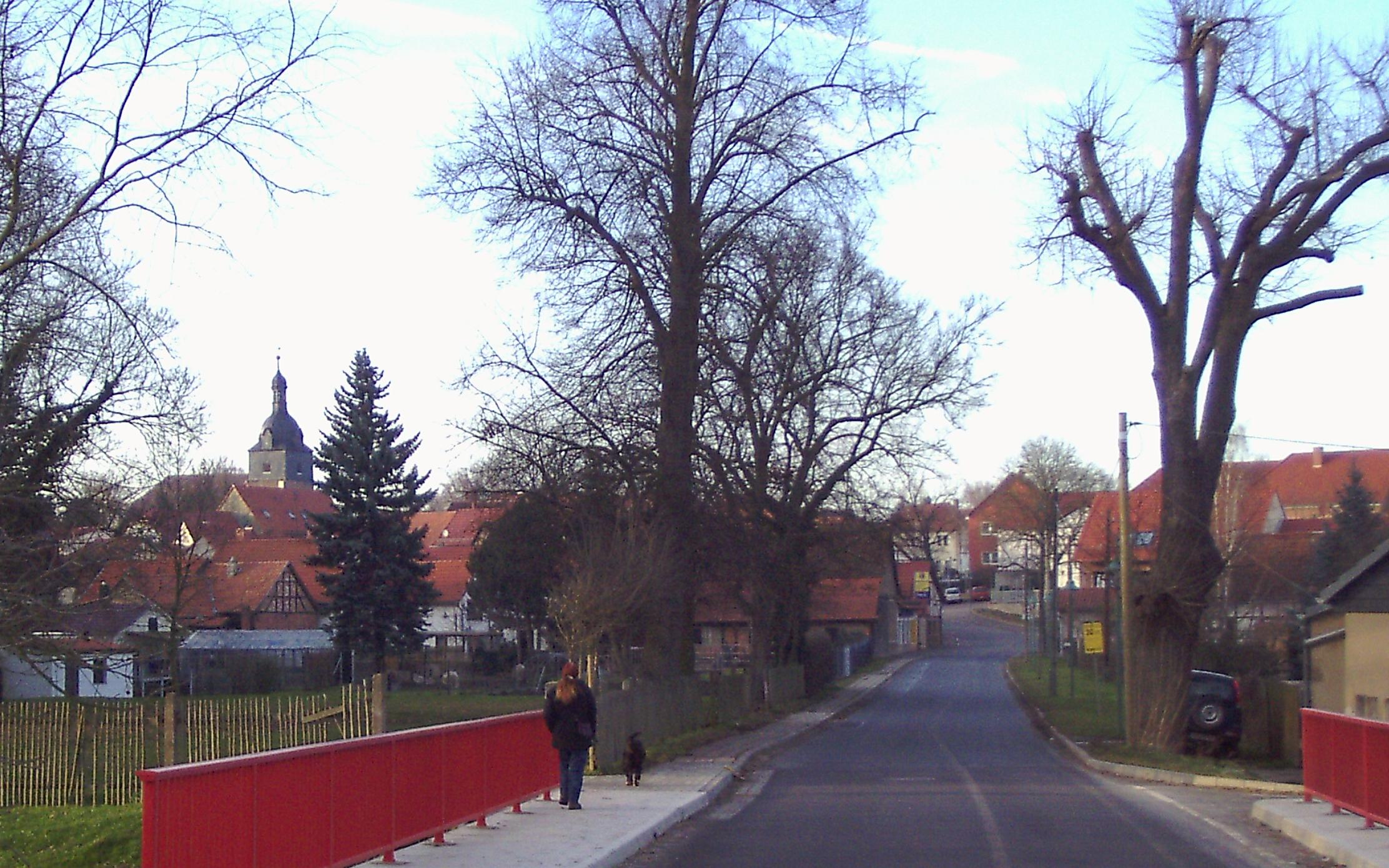
- Entrance to Seebach, view from the south
- Interactive map of Seebach
- Location within Germany Location within Thuringia
- Coordinates: 51°9′52″N 10°30′49″E
- Country: Germany
- State: Thuringia
- District: Unstrut-Hainich-Kreis
- Town: Mühlhausen
- First mentioned: 859

Government
  - Mayor: Beatrice Gebhardt
- Elevation: 187 m (614 ft)

Population (March 2021)
  - Total: 655
- Time zone: UTC+01:00 (CET)
  - Summer (DST): UTC+02:00 (CEST)
- Postal codes: 99998
- Dialling codes: 03601
- Vehicle registration: UH, LSZ, MHL
- Website: muehlhausen.de

Seebach (pronounced [ˈzeːbax]) is a village and a rural quarter of the town of Mühlhausen in Thuringia, central Germany. It lies on the right side of the Unstrut river.

== Geography ==
=== Location ===
Seebach lies to the north of the Seebach, a left-bank tributary of the Unstrut coming from Niederdorla, at an altitude of between 190 m (620 ft) and 195 m (640 ft) above NN. The highest elevations within the Seebach terrain are the Kobenberg (213.6 m (701 ft) above NN) in the south and the Kahler Berg (208.1 m (683 ft) above NN) in the southwest.

=== Geology ===
The near-surface geological subsoil of the hilly farmland around Seebach is characterised by the rocks of the Gypsum Keuper and the Bunte Mergel (Middle Keuper). The mostly clayey rocks are overlain by thick loess loam layers, especially on the hilltops. In the broad Unstrut valley in the east, alluvial loams are exposed.

== History ==
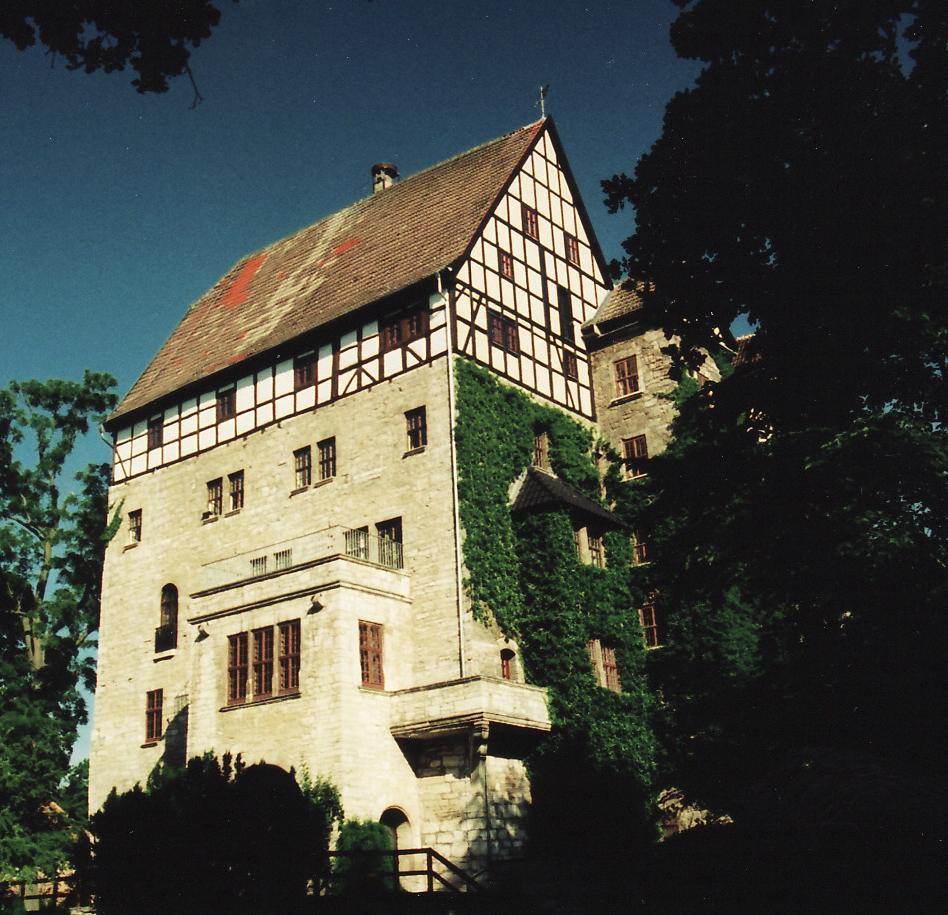
The moated castle of Burg Seebach

Seebach was first mentioned as "Sebecke" in a deed of gift from Count Erpho to the Prince-Bishopric of Würzburg in 859 AD. The village was named after a 1.5 kilometres (0.93 mi) long lake that has long since silted up. In the register of the tithes of the Hersfeld Abbey, which was compiled between 881 and 899, Seebach is probably mentioned under the name "Seobach" as a place liable to tithes in the Friesenfeld territory. The Romanesque predecessor of today's St John's Church was built in 1123.

The moated castle of Burg Seebach is said to have been built around 1227 by Lutz von Seebach on behalf of the archbishops of Mainz. Hans Sittich von Berlepsch, Saxon bailiff at Wartburg Castle, acquired the castle in 1523; it was destroyed in the Peasants' War in 1525 and subsequently rebuilt by him. The castle was modified later, especially in the 19th century and 1911–1914, into the multi-storey stone building with half-timbered superstructure that has survived to the present day.

Seebach belonged to the Electorate of Langensalza until 1815, and after its cession to Prussia from 1816 to 1944 to the district of Langensalza in the province of Saxony.

The commitment of the owner of the castle and career officer Hans Freiherr von Berlepsch (1857–1933) to scientific and practical bird protection was recognised in 1908 when the Royal Prussian State Government recognised his estate as an ornithological "experimental and model station". The "old master of German bird protection" has lain in a simple grave in the Seebach cemetery since 1933. Since 1936, the institution at Seebach Castle has officially been allowed to use the title Staatliche Vogelschutzwarte ("State Bird Protection Station").

In 1945, first an American, then a Soviet occupation moved into the castle. The von Berlepsch family was expropriated due to the land reform in the Soviet occupation zone of Germany and thus lost their ancestral seat Seebach. Both von Berlepsch families had to leave Seebach.

In 1946, the "Ornithological Research Centre" was able to move into the lower floor of the moated castle. It became a sub-department of the German Democratic Republic's "Institute for Plant Protection Research" in Kleinmachnow and focused on the effects of the large-scale use of toxic agrochemicals in GDR agriculture on bird life and on the "defence against harmful birds". The current head of the institution, Dr Jaehne, describes the testing of 300 toxic agents on a colony of Japanese quail kept specifically for this purpose as a "sad phase in our history".

Seebach Castle underwent an urgently needed thorough renovation after the fall of communism.

On 30 June 1994, Seebach became part of the newly created municipality of Weinbergen. Since 1 January 2019, when the municipality of Weinbergen was dissolved and its villages joined the town of Mühlhausen, Seebach has been a quarter of that town.

== Sights ==
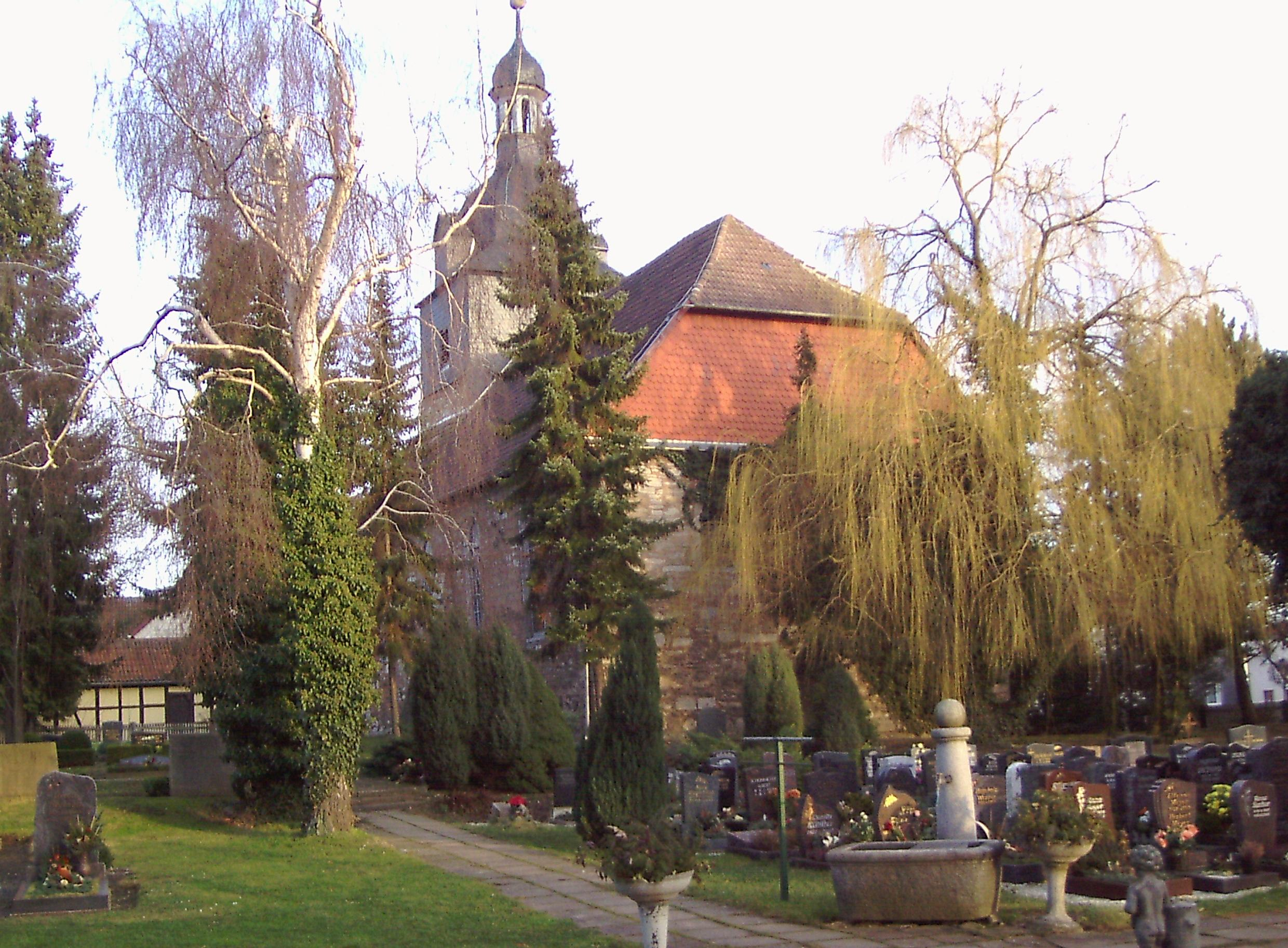
St John's Church with churchyard

- In the west of the village, there is the Seebach moated castle with its bird protection station, a branch of the Thuringian State Institute for the Environment and Geology (TLUG), which has existed since 1908 and was awarded the title Staatliche Vogelschutzwarte ("State Bird Protection Station") in 1936. The castle is embedded in a park with old trees and a park pond. Visits are possible.
- In the centre of the village, there is the Lutheran church of St John the Evangelist which was founded on a Romanesque predecessor building first mentioned in 1123.
- The grave of Hans von Berlepsch, the founder of German bird protection, can be found in the cemetery.

== Economy ==
Seebach is characterised by agriculture. The surrounding hills are mainly used for agriculture. In the north-east of the village, the agricultural cooperative Agrargenossenschaft Großengottern has its headquarters, a large agricultural company with 3,700 hectares (14 mi^{2}) of usable land, as well as a sales outlet of the associated food company. To the west of the village is a large stable with a biogas plant.

In the industrial area in the north-east, there is also an automobile recycling company. In the eastern part of the village, there is a company producing pickled preserves, in particular barrel sauerkraut. The white cabbage is grown for this purpose in the Unstrut floodplain and on the loess soils of the Keuper hills in the Seebach territory and in the immediate vicinity. The special crops need a lot of water, which they receive in times of drought from the Seebach-Oppershausen reservoir built for irrigation purposes to the west of the village. The reservoir has a capacity of 5 million m³, making it one of the largest reservoirs in the Inner Thuringian agricultural hill region.

== Transport ==
The village is tangent to the Bundesstraße (federal highway) 247 in the east. There is a DB Regio railway stop to the north-east of the village. Seebach is connected to the village of Höngeda in the north by a second-order country road (L 2101). In the south, the road continues to Heroldishausen and joins the road 2100 between Großengottern and Mülverstedt.

== Notable people ==
- August Adolph von Berlepsch (1790–1867), forester
- August von Berlepsch (1815–1877), bee-keeper and researcher
- Hans Freiherr von Berlepsch (1857–1933), regular officer and ornithologist
- Mechthild von Alemann (born 1937), politician (FDP)

== Miscellaneous ==
- The 100th anniversary of the Vogelschutzwarte (bird protection station) in Seebach was commemorated with a special stamp.
