= Hainich =

Hill chain in Germany

Coordinates: 51°06′N 10°23′E

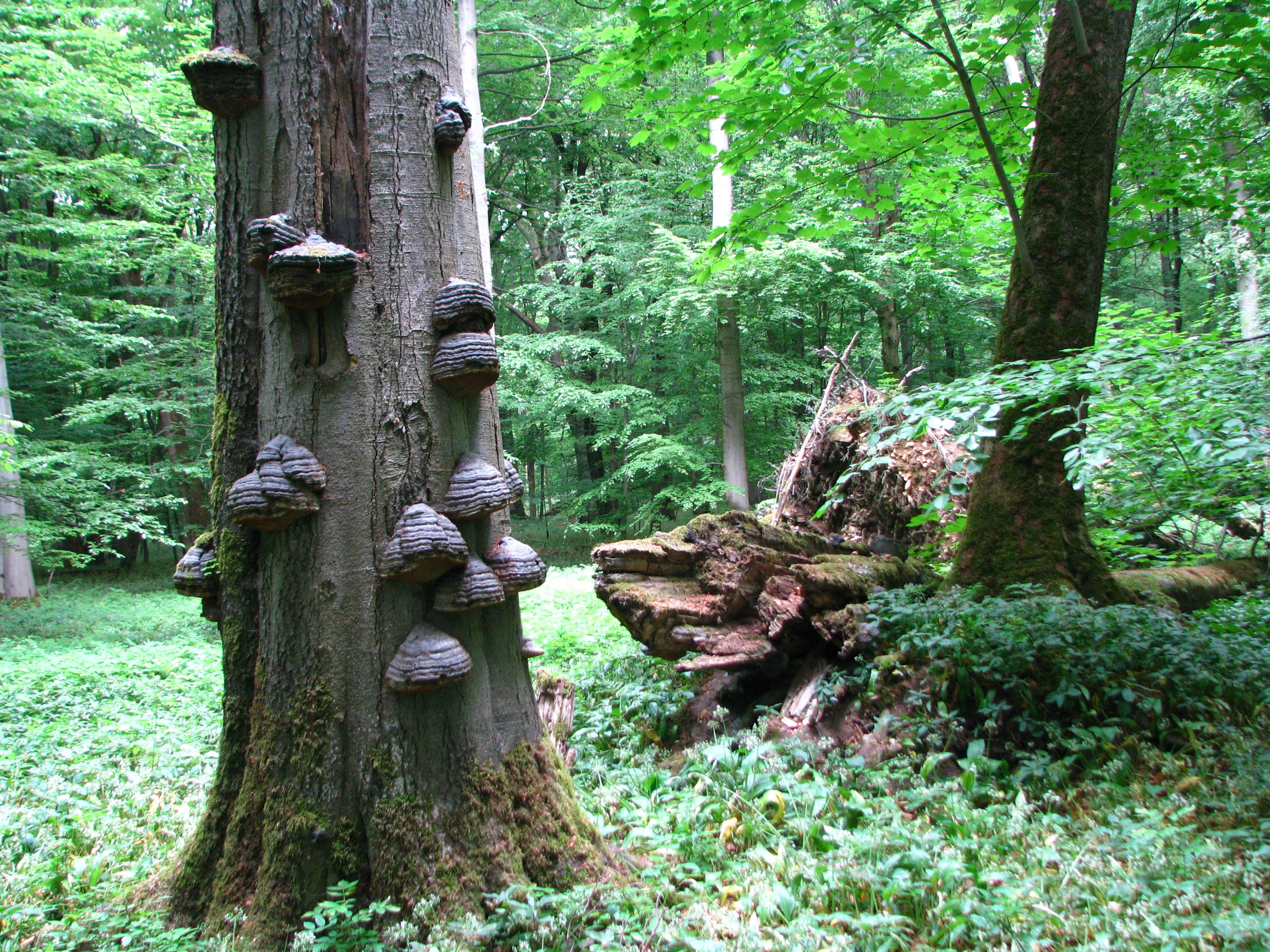
Primeval beech forest in Weberstedt Forest in the centre of Hainich National Park

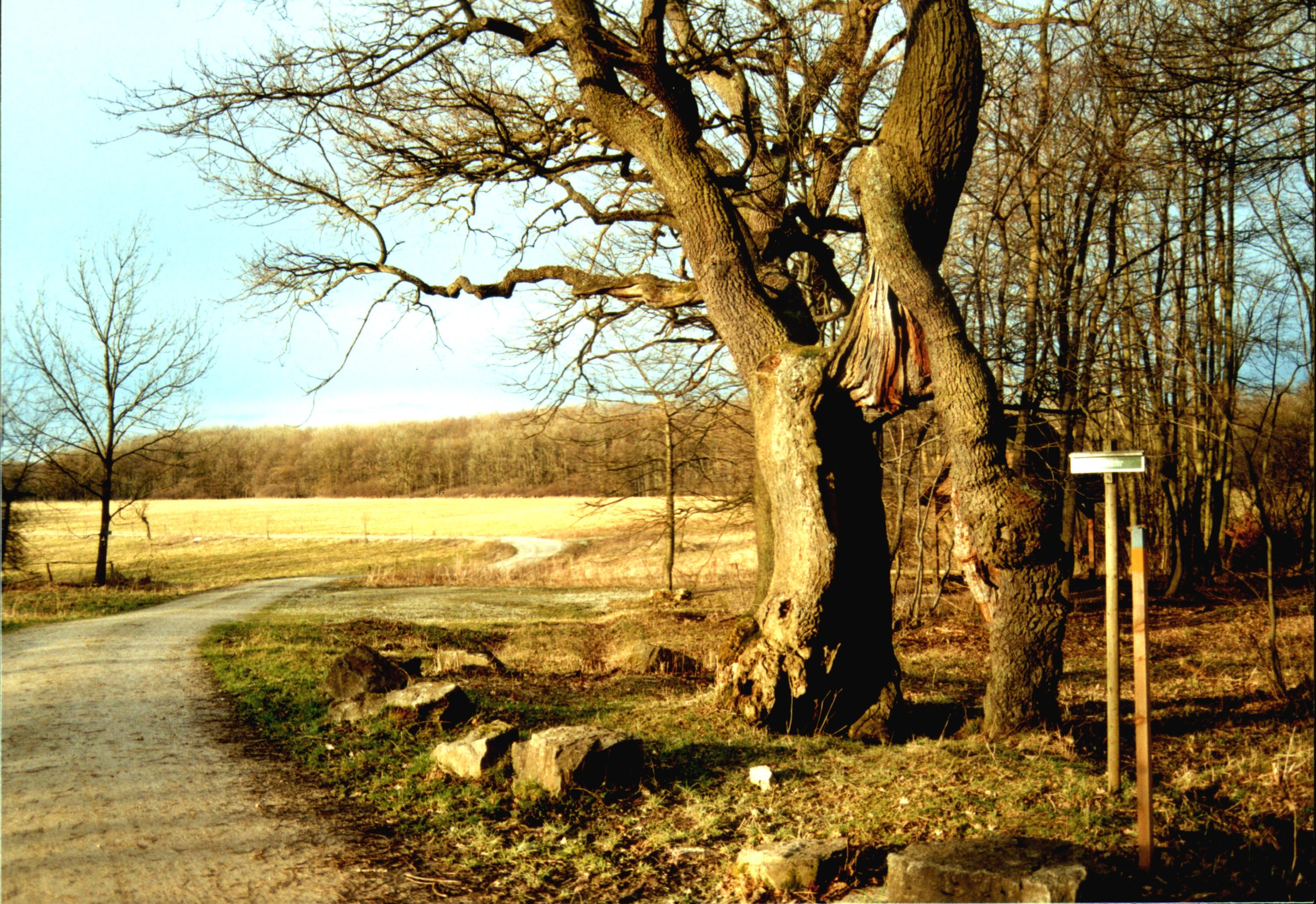
Betteleiche is the landmark of Hainich

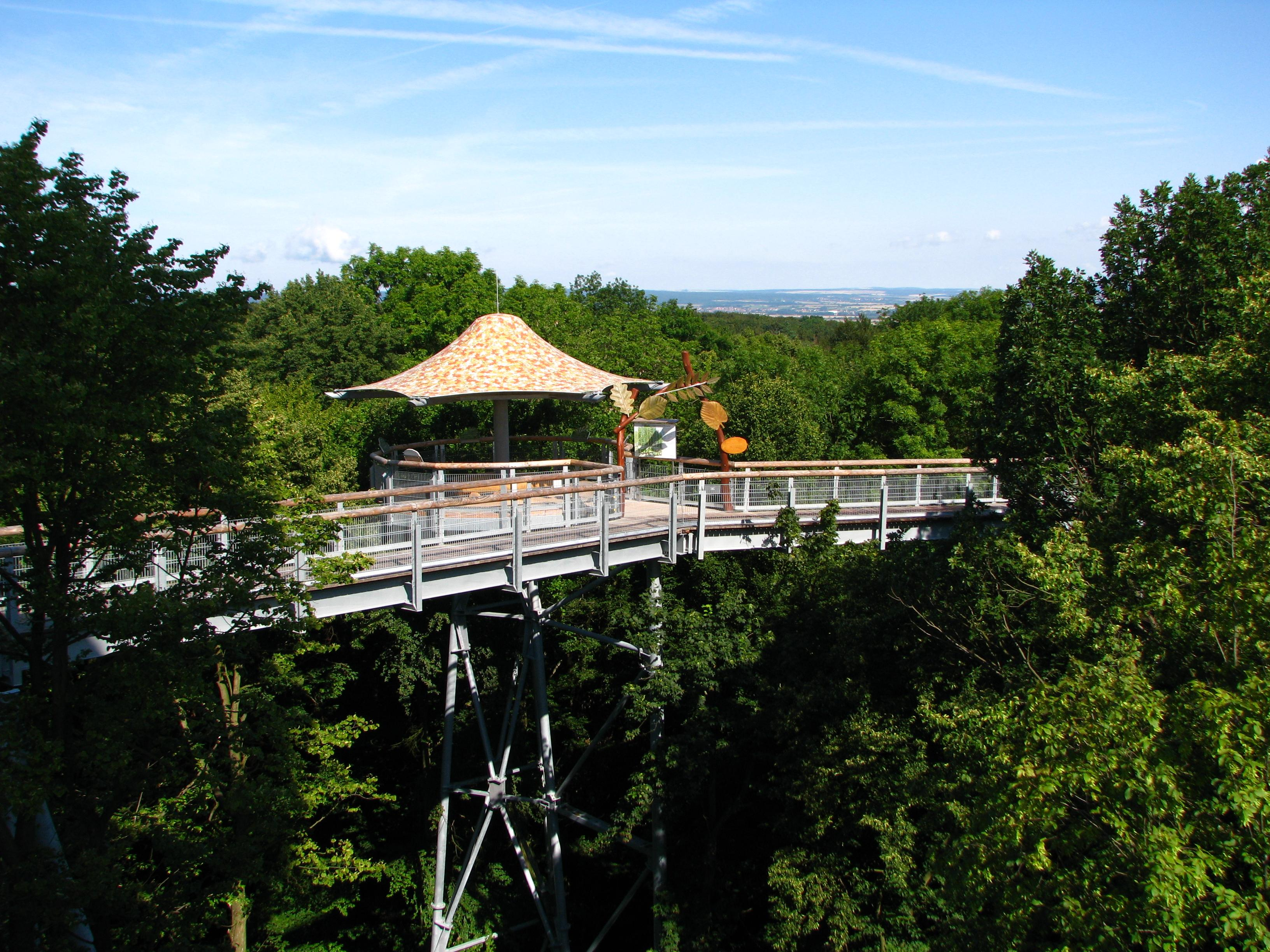
Information hut in form of a mushroom on the top of tree canopy path in National Park Hainich

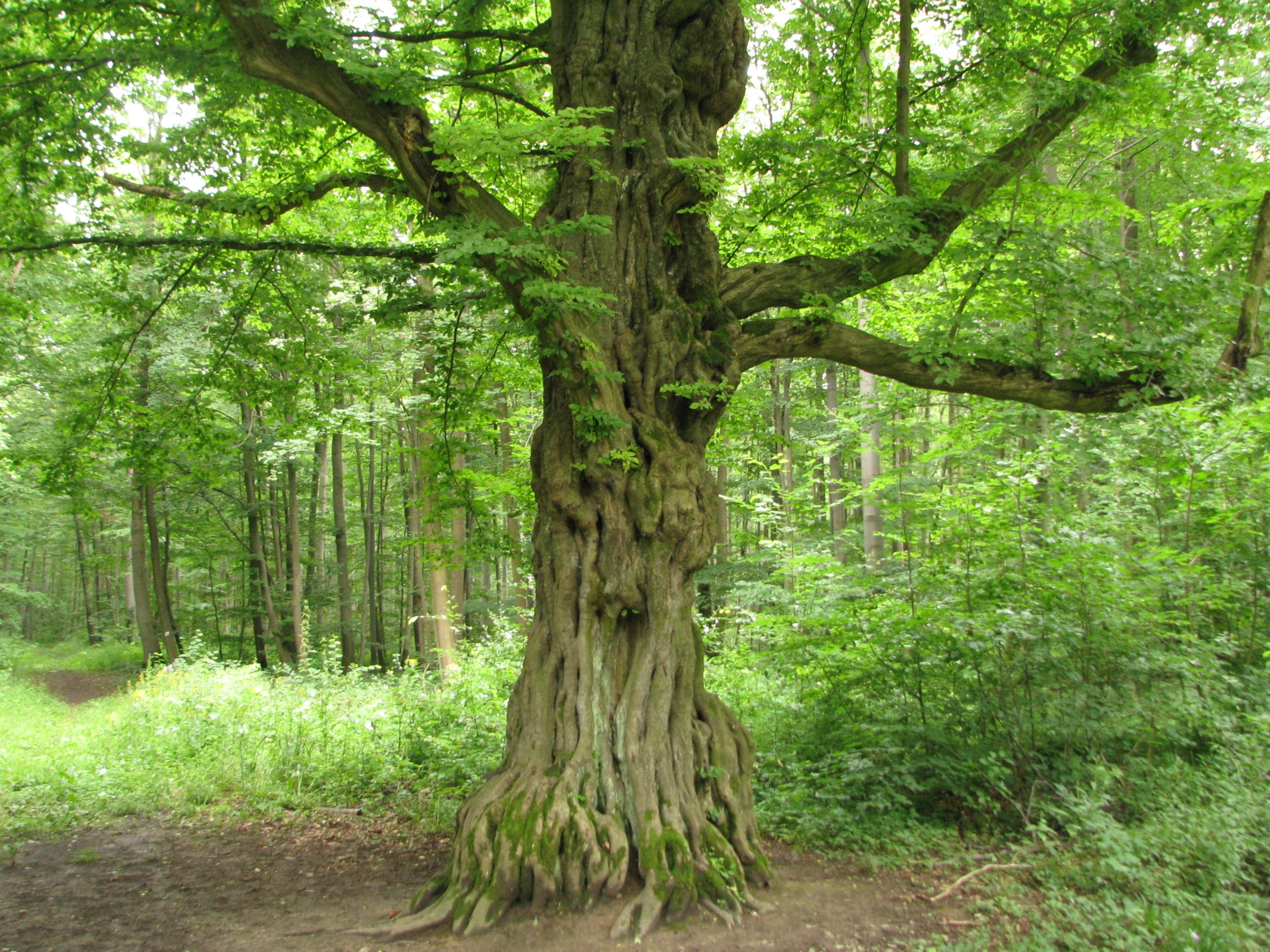
Corpusbuche, a curious old hornbeam in Mühlhäuser Stadtwald (Hainich)

Hainich (German pronunciation: [ˈhaɪnɪç]) is a forested hill chain in the state of Thuringia in Germany, between the towns of Eisenach, Mühlhausen and Bad Langensalza. Hainich covers an area of around 160 km² (61,8 sq mi), of which, since 31 December 1997, half has been designated as Hainich National Park. The highest point in Hainich is Alte Berg at 1621 ft (494 m). The Mühlhäuser Stadtwald in the northern part of Hainich is the largest municipal forest in Thuringia. The landmark of Hainich is Betteleiche, a 600-year-old common oak at Ihlefeld.

== Geography ==
Hainich is 18,6 mls (30 km) long from north to south and 2,5 to 5 mls (4 to 8 km) broad from west to east. The western edge of Hainich leads to Lempertsbach and Lauterbach valley and is steeper than the eastern slope. In the northwest you can find high rocks like Sommerstein and Winterstein. The reason for the steeper slopes in western Hainich is the Saalfeld-Gotha-Eichenberg fault. Because of limestone the Hainich creeks are dry for the most time of the year. In the east of Hainich water rises up in strong sources like Kainspring or Popperöder Quelle. So Hainich is a karst region.

=== Communities ===
The following communities take part of Hainich: Eigenrieden, Heyerode, Hallungen, Nazza, Mihla, Lauterbach, Bischofroda, Berka v.d Hainich, Behringen, Reichenbach, Craula, Zimmern, Alterstedt, Weberstedt, Mülverstedt, Flarchheim, Kammerforst, Oppershausen, Langula, Niederdorla, Oberdorla, Mühlhausen.

== Geology ==
The geological surface of Hainich is Middle Triassic limestone so called Muschelkalk.

== Climate ==
The annual average precipitation at Hainich ridge is as 31.5 in (800 mm). The average temperature is 43,7 °F (6,5 °C). The lower parts in the east are drier and warmer. The next commercial weather station is near Weberstedt.

== Ecology ==
Hainich contains the largest coherent area of deciduous trees in Germany. The main trees are beech, mixed with ash, maple, tilia cordata, hornbeam and chequer tree (Sorbus torminalis). Hainich is also known as an important habitat for European wildcat (Felis silvestris). Central parts of Hainich National Park, so Weberstedt and Schöndorf forest, are rich on dead wood. That's the reason for the incidence of 522 beetles with their habitat only in wood. Biologists found from 1992 to 2008 altogether 2080 of different beetles in Hainich National Park.

== Forestry ==
The north of Hainich is managed by the forestry service in Creuzburg. The forests belong to the municipality of Mühlhausen and to the cooperatives of Oberdorla, Niederdorla, Langula and Kammerforst. Selective tree cutting and uneven-aged management are dominant in the beech forests. Sycamore maple and Chequer tree are bringing the best yield. In former times oaks and hornbeam were favored.

== Tourism ==
A traditional trail is Rennstieg. It is 19,5 mls (31,3 km) long and leads from Eigenrieden in the north to Behringen in the south across Hainich. On 26 August 2005 nearby Thiemsburg forester's house in the southeast of Hainich one of the largest tree canopy paths was declared to be open. It is the most important institution for environmental education in Thuringia and a platform for ecological research in the treetop region of a broadleaf forest. An attraction in Mühlhäuser Stadtwald are the Redwood trees (Sequoiadendron giganteum) from 1884. They are the largest ones in Thuringia. A trail from Weißes Haus on the eastern edge of Hainich leads to this site. Another curious tree, also in Mühlhäuser Stadtwald, is Corpusbuche a 400-year-old hornbeam.
