= Großengottern =

- Ortsteil of Unstrut-Hainich
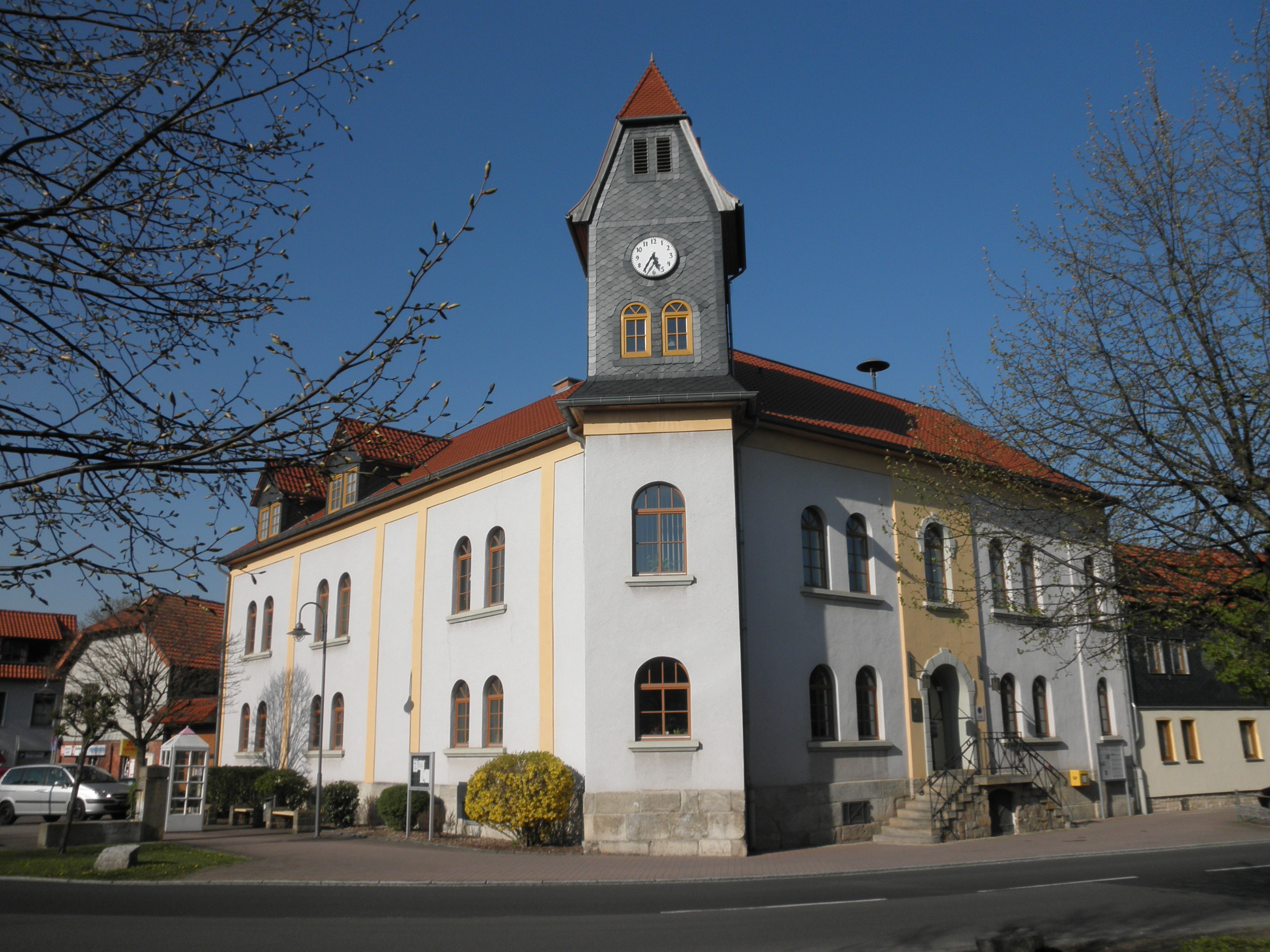
- Town hall

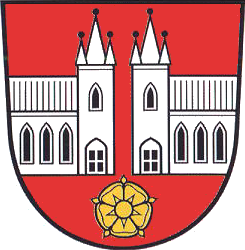
- Coat of arms
- Interactive map of Großengottern
- Location within Germany Location within Thuringia
- Coordinates: 51°9′N 10°35′E
- Country: Germany
- State: Thuringia
- District: Unstrut-Hainich-Kreis
- Municipality: Unstrut-Hainich
- First mentioned: 811 or 1253

Area
  - Total: 19.34 km^{2} (7.47 sq mi)
- Elevation: 187 m (614 ft)

Population (2017-12-31)
  - Total: 2,286
  - Density: 118.2/km^{2} (306.1/sq mi)
- Time zone: UTC+01:00 (CET)
  - Summer (DST): UTC+02:00 (CEST)
- Postal codes: 99991
- Dialling codes: 036022
- Website: grossengottern.com

Großengottern (German pronunciation: [ɡʁoːsn̩ˈɡɔtɐn]) is a village and a former municipality in the Unstrut-Hainich-Kreis district of Thuringia, Germany. Since 1 January 2019, it is part of the municipality of Unstrut-Hainich.

== Geography ==
Großengottern is located in the northern Thuringian basin between the towns of Mühlhausen and Bad Langensalza. The village of Großengottern lies in the area of the Inner Thuringian hilly farmland, the north and the east of the village, the Gotternsches Ried, in the Unstrut floodplain between Mühlhausen and Bad Langensalza. The highest elevation is 220 metres (720 ft) above sea level (NN) at Kammerforster Weg to the west of the village, the lowest at about 173 metres (568 ft) above sea level (NN) on the Unstrut in the far east of the terrain. Other elevations are the two former undercut slope areas of the Unstrut, the 193.3-metre-high (634 ft) Hopfenberg hill to the north-east and the 193.6-metre-high (635 ft) Schalkenberg to the south-east of the village. The Gottern area is mainly used for agriculture, with arable farming predominating. Poplar forests are found on the southern edge of the Gotternsches Ried; the Großengottern dam is a reservoir originally built for the irrigation of the fields.

== History ==
The village was first mentioned in a document in 811; however, according to Wolfgang Kahl, the first documentary mention of Großengottern took place on 13 March 1253.

There was once a castle site in the area of the Walpurgis' cemetery. The church and the cemetery are most likely located on the site of the medieval manor castle. The gatehouse from the cemetery in 1580 and the church tower, built in 1494, still show the fortified nature of the area.

The Mülverstedt convent of the Hermits of Saint William acquired a plot of land in Großengottern in the first half of the 14th century in order to set up a hospital here. The village chapel of St Andrew probably emerged from this facility around 1347. In the 15th century, the hospital was described as a leprosarium; it was one of the 39 leprosariums known so far in Thuringia. The complex was further altered by rebuilding in the 18th and 19th centuries. The Lords of Hopffgarten had converted the estate into an old people's home. A woman known as Katzenbertha ("Cats Bertha") can be traced as the last resident. From 1958 to 1990, a local history museum was housed in the former hospital.

In the Late Middle Ages and Early Modern Period, the Lords of Seebach held the office of Schultheiß (mayor) in Großengottern along with market rights and a castle fiefdom.

Until 1815, the village belonged to the Electoral Saxon district of Langensalza and, after its cession to Prussia, from 1816 to 1944 to the district of Langensalza in the Province of Saxony.

On 4 March 1949, a four-engine US supply plane for the Berlin Airlift exploded and crashed between Großengottern and Heroldishausen. Four of the five crew members were able to save themselves with parachutes, but Lieutenant R. C. Stephens lost his life. He was honoured in 1999 by erecting a memorial plaque near the crash site on a road. During the time of the GDR, the crash was kept secret as far as possible.

Since 1993, Großengottern was a member and administrative seat of the Unstrut-Hainich administrative association, whose member municipalities (except of Schönstedt) merged to form the rural municipality of Unstrut-Hainich on 1 January 2019.

== Culture and sights ==
- The Lutheran churches of St Martin and St Walpurgis with vicarage and gateway to the churchyard.
- The former hospital St.-Andreas-Kapelle (St Andrew's Chapel) consisted of the hospital house, the chapel and two outbuildings. The chapel was a one-storey building with a gable roof. A small bell tower rises above the west gable.
- Village museum with the remains of an Electoral Saxon post mile column from 1729 in the courtyard. At that time, the village belonged to the Duchy of Saxony-Weißenfels. The village museum is part of a larger complex with an exhibition of old agricultural machinery and tractors on the grounds of the Hornhardtsches Rittergut ("Hornhardt's Knights' Estate"). Also on display are two of the four engines of an American supply plane ("sultana bomber") that crashed near Großengottern on 4 March 1949. The airplane was en route for the Berlin Airlift from West Germany to West Berlin, which was blockaded by the Red Army.
- War memorial for the fallen of both world wars.
- Memorial plaque for an airman killed in the crash of a US Berlin Airlift airplane in March 1949. The memorial, erected in 1999, is located about 3 kilometres (1.9 mi) west of Großengottern on Kammerforster Weg, just before its junction with the road from Heroldishausen to Seebach.
