= Unstrut-Hainich =

- Municipality
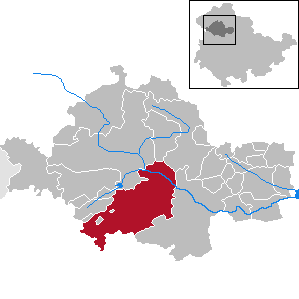
- Location of Unstrut-Hainich within Unstrut-Hainich-Kreis district
- Interactive map of Unstrut-Hainich
- Location within Germany Location within Thuringia
- Coordinates: 51°08′N 10°34′E
- Country: Germany
- State: Thuringia
- District: Unstrut-Hainich-Kreis
- Subdivisions: 7

Area
  - Total: 117.09 km^{2} (45.21 sq mi)
- Elevation: 225 m (738 ft)

Population (2025-12-31)
  - Total: 6,378
  - Density: 54.47/km^{2} (141.1/sq mi)
- Time zone: UTC+01:00 (CET)
  - Summer (DST): UTC+02:00 (CEST)
- Postal codes: 99991, 99947, 99986
- Dialling codes: 036022, 036028
- Vehicle registration: UH

Unstrut-Hainich (German pronunciation: [ˈʊnʃtʁuːt ˈhaɪnɪç, -ˈʊns]) is a municipality in the district Unstrut-Hainich-Kreis, in Thuringia, Germany. It was created with effect from 1 January 2019 by the merger of the former municipalities of Altengottern, Flarchheim, Großengottern, Heroldishausen, Mülverstedt and Weberstedt. On 1 January 2024, it absorbed the former municipality Schönstedt. The name refers to the river Unstrut and the hill chain Hainich.
