= Tobias Heinrich Gottfried Trost =

German organ-builder

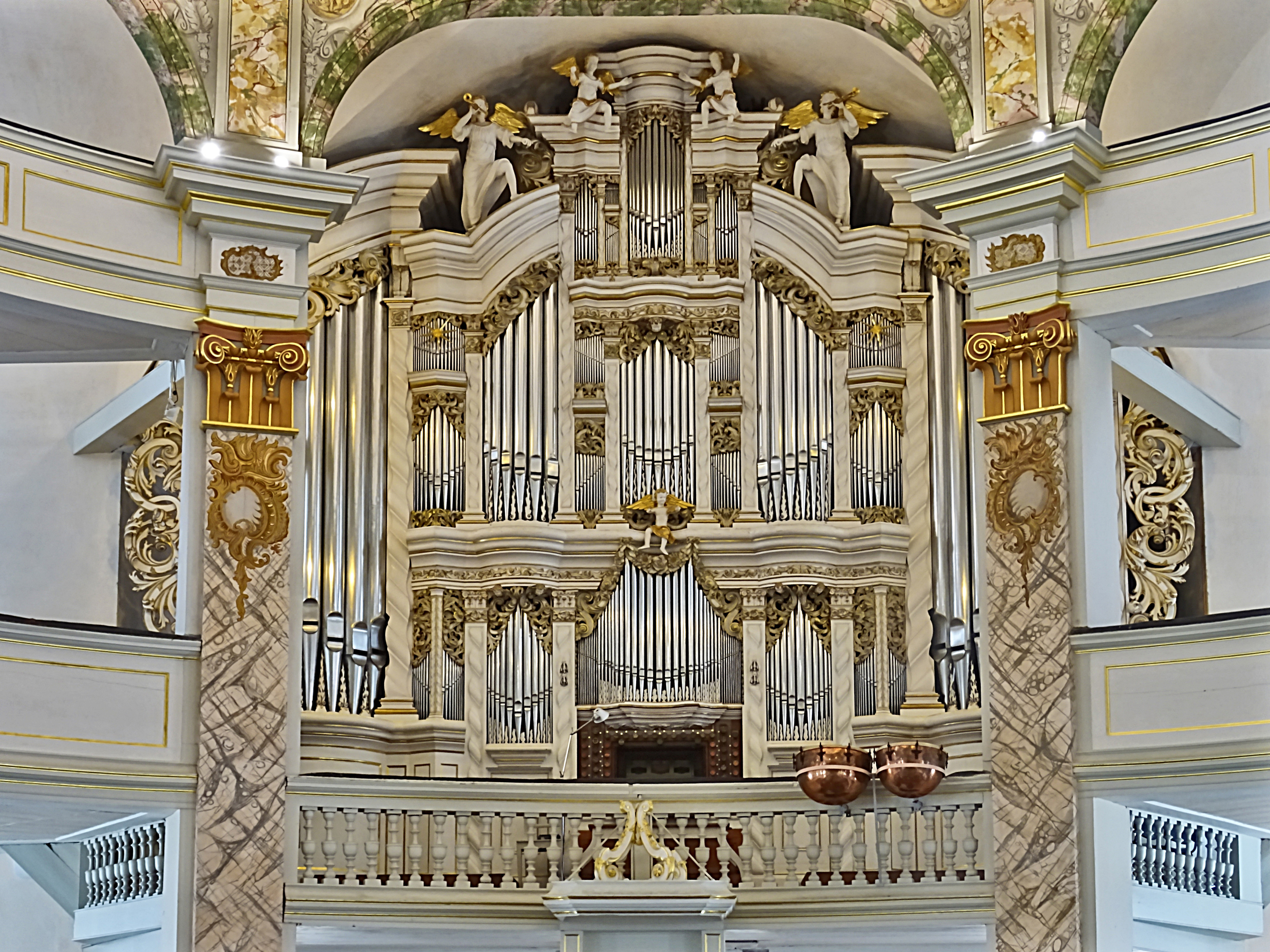
Organ in Waltershausen

Tobias Heinrich Gottfried Trost (born around 1680; died 12 August 1759 in Altenburg) was a leading Thuringian organ-builder. Johann Sebastian Bach held him in high regard. His organs in the city church of Waltershausen (1722–1730) and in the Altenburg Palace (1735–1739) are amongst the best-known Baroque organs of middle-Europe, and are largely preserved in their original state.

== Life ==
Tobias Heinrich Gottfried Trost was son of the organ-builder Johann Tobias Gottfried Trost and his wife, Anna Dorothea, née Thüm (died 1703). The first work that can be assigned to him was carried out between 1697 and 1706 in conjunction with his father, from whom he learned his craft. On 3 November 1704 he married Susanna Catharina Schweinefleisch (died 1749) in Tonna. By 1711 he was a master-builder in his own right.

In early 1718 Trost moved to the house of his brother-in-law in Mockern, and then again to Altenburg in 1722, after the death of his father. Following an argument with Johann Jacob Donati the elder over organ-building privileges, he was chosen on 23 November 1723 as organ-builder to the court. The argument with Donati broke out again in 1726/1727.

In 1733 Trost found himself in financial difficulties and took out loans with his son-in-law and two widows. His health began to deteriorate in 1754; in the summer of 1756 he suffered a stroke, and he died in 1759 after three months' serious illness.

== Career ==
Five rebuilds and 21 new organs can be assigned to Trost. Amongst others, he built the organ of the evangelical church in Waltershausen, the largest baroque organ in Thuringia. Another of his important works is that in the chapel of the Altenburg palace, which was much admired by Franz Liszt. Bach's pupil Johann Ludwig Krebs was organist of this organ from 1756 to 1780. A later organist at Altenburg, Wilhelm Stade praised the organ in 1880 in his assessment:

Die Orgel der Schlosskirche gilt als eine der besten Orgeln Deutschlands, und dies nicht mit Unrecht, denn sie zeichnet sich durch Glanz, Kraft, besonders der Bässe, durch charakteristische, feinsinnige Intonation einzelner Stimmen aus; die Solidität der Arbeit ließ nicht zu wünschen übrig.

The organ of the palace chapel is rated as one of the best in Germany, and this with good reason, because it is outstanding for its brilliance, its power, and especially for its bass notes, and through the characteristic sensitive intonation of its individual voices. The solidity of its workmanship leaves nothing to be desired.

— Wilhelm Stade

While Gottfried Silbermann built fairly conventional organs following five basic standardised patterns, Trost was more experimental. He frequently tried new ideas, and favoured colour stops. His flute choirs were particularly strong, reaching up into the one-foot pitch range. On the other hand, he used mixtures only sparingly. Each division had only one mixture containing thirds, and he did not use the Scharf or Cymbale stops. He used reed pipes sparingly, mostly confined to the pedal, but he appreciated "toy" stops and effects. Trost divided his stops between Hauptwerk (Great), Brustwerk, and Pedal, sometimes with an Oberwerk. This was the only arrangement he ever used.

Trost was a poor businessman. He often missed deadlines and exceeded agreed costs, causing disagreement with his employers. It is known that he worked on the Waltershausen organ from 1722 to 1730 despite having agreed to complete the work in two and a half years. The city councillor Marci was driven to poetry about the "dissolute organ-builder Trost", whose name translates as "comfort" or "consolation":

Vor gethan und nach bedacht, hat manchen,
und auch Uns bey diesem gantzen Kirch-Bau,
in viel Leid und Unglück bracht.
Der Orgelmacher heisst zwahr Trost,
doch giebt Er uns gar schlechten Trost,
Ach weren wir vom Trost erlost.

—Stadtrat Marci
Translation:

From start to finish many men,
Have suffered building organs, then
We too have joined their ranks, with Trost:
"Consolation" is his name's translation,
But he gives us scant elation,
"No-Trost!" is what we hope for most.

Gottfried Silbermann was asked for an expert opinion of the Altenburg organ. Despite his appreciation of the organ, Silbermann made various suggestions for improvements, "concerning which H. Trost went to much effort, sparing himself no work, but which can have brought him little profit". After its completion in 1739 this organ rapidly became a magnet for organists and a popular concert instrument.

== Organs on which Trost worked ==
The roman numerals indicate the number of manuals. An uppercase "P" indicates an independent pedal organ with its own sounding stops, while a lowercase "p" indicates a pull-down pedal linked to the keyboards, merely allowing the player to play manual keyboard notes with their feet. The Arabic numerals indicate the number of sounding registers (i.e. stop-knobs excluding accessories such as tremulants and couplers).

Year	Location	Church	Image	Manuals	Registers	Comments
1697–1701	Bad Langensalza	St. Stephani		III/P	34	A new-build carried out with his father; replaced in 1885
1701	Tonna					A new-build carried out with his father; no longer exists
1705 (?)	Aschara	St. Peter's church		II/P		A new-build carried out with his father; destroyed by fire in the 18th century
1705–1706	Eckardtsleben	St. Vitus church		I	8 (?)	New-build; no longer exists
1709–1713	Döllstädt	St. Peter and Paul church		II/P	20	New-build; only the façade remains
1712–1717	Großengottern	St Walpurgis' church		II/P	22	A new-build, largely remaining; restored in 1996/1997
1722	Aspach	St. Ulrich's church		I	9	A new-build attributed to Trost
1720–1723	Großstöbnitz (Schmölln)	Evangelical/Lutheran church		I/P	8	A new-build, replaced in 1886
1721–1726	Narsdorf-Ossa	Village church		I	9	A new-build, completed by Johann Jacob Donati. Replaced in 1886
1722–1730	Waltershausen	Stadtkirche		III/P	47	A new-build, surviving intact. Restored 1995-1998. Waltershausen organ
1730?	Saalfeld	Saalfeld castle				A new-build attributed to Trost
1730–1733	Kriebitzsch	St Veit's church				A new-build, replaced in 1899
1731–1733	Eisenberg	Palace church				An enlargement of the original organ by Christoph Donat (1683), remaining to this day, with minor modifications in 1776 and 1862; restored 1959-1963, and returned to its 1733 condition with further restoration from 1986.
1730–1735	Stünzhain, in Altenburg	Village church		I		A new-build, of which some ranks remain
1735?	Altenburg	Chapel at the Altenburg palace (a Positiv organ)				A new-build, partly remaining in Thonhausen and in the Gnadenkapelle, Altenburg
1735–1739	Altenburg	Altenburg palace (Main organ)		II/P	36	A new-build, substantially remaining, restored 1974-1976
1744–1746	Thonhausen	Lutheran church		I/P	11	A new-build, much rebuilt since
1745–1746	Nobitz	Lutheran village church		I/P	10	A new-build, replaced in 1826
1746	Bocka (Windischleuba)	Village church		I/P	10	A new-build attributed to Trost, parts remaining
1747–1748	Lohma an der Leina, in Langenleuba-Niederhain	Evangelical church		I/P	10	A new-build that no longer exists; replaced in 1878
1747–1750	Saara	Christophorus church		I/P	15	A new-build, parts remain
1747–1752	Eisenberg	St. Peter's church		II/P	24	A new-build of which nothing remains; replaced 1848

== Literature ==
- Friedrich, Felix (2001). "Trost, Tobias Heinrich Gottfried". Grove Music Online (8th ed.). Oxford University Press. ISBN 978-1-56159-263-0. (subscription, Wikilibrary access, or UK public library membership required)
- Friedrich, Felix (1989). Der Orgelbauer Heinrich Gottfried Trost. Leben – Werk – Leistung. Leipzig: Deutscher Verlag für Musik. ISBN 3-370-00287-6.
