= St Walpurgis' Church, Großengottern =

St Walpurgis' Church
- German: St.-Walpurgis-Kirche
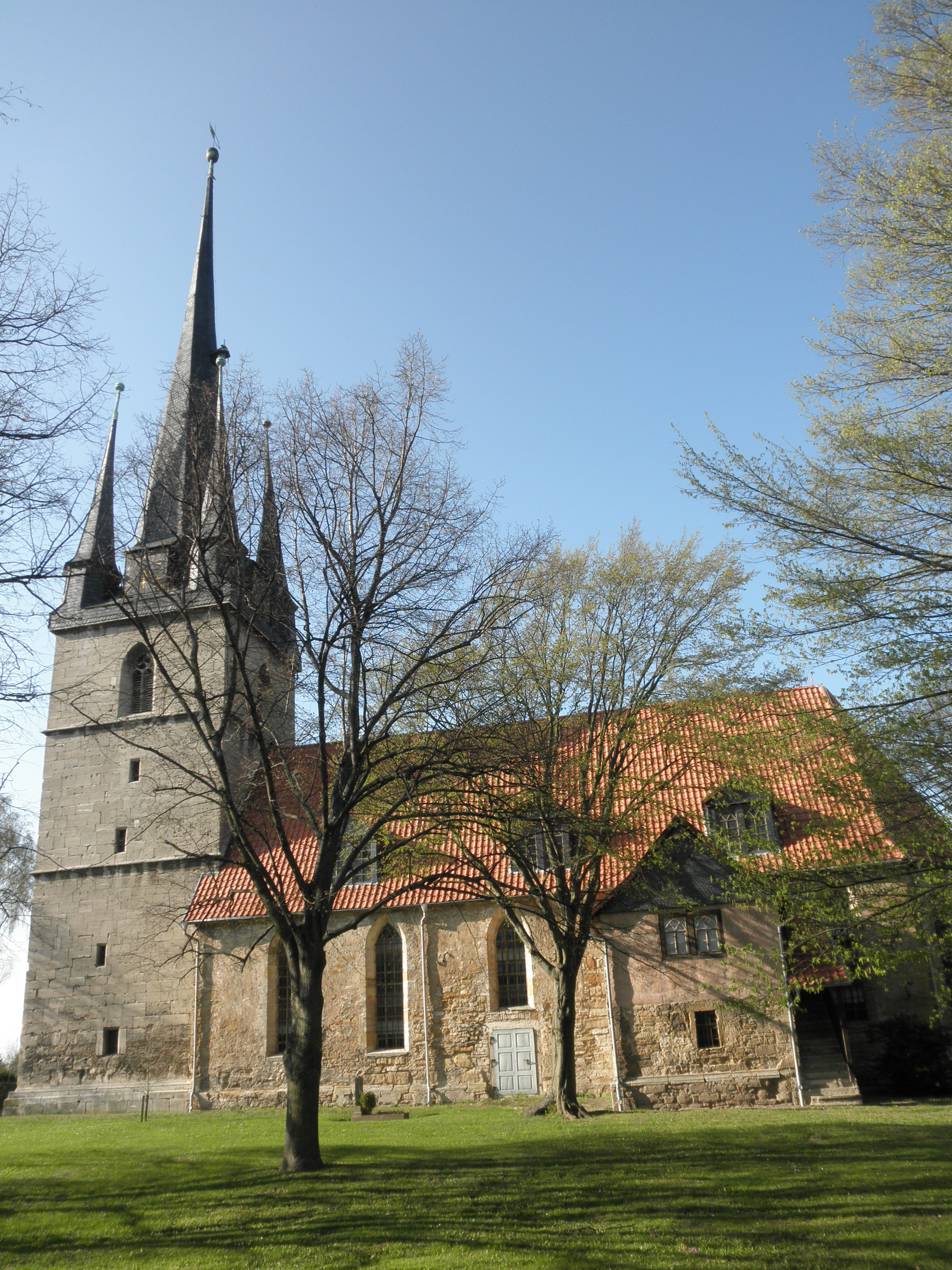

- Location in Germany
- 51.147423°N 10.558226°E
- Location: Großengottern, Unstrut-Hainich-Kreis, Thuringia
- Country: Germany
- Denomination: Lutheran
- Previous denomination: Roman Catholic

History
- Status: Parish church
- Dedication: Saint Walpurga

Architecture
- Style: Late Gothic
- Years built: 15th century

St Walpurgis' Church (German: St.-Walpurgis-Kirche) in the upper part of the village of Großengottern in Thuringia, Germany, is a Late Gothic church building dating from the 15th century. Today, it is a Lutheran parish church. St Walpurgis' Church is known for its large Baroque organ by the significant organ builder Tobias H. G. Trost.

== History and architecture ==
Like St Martin's Church in the lower part of Großengottern, which is also Late Gothic and was first mentioned in a document in 1318, St Walpurgis' Church is older than the written records indicate. A priest has been resident in Großengottern since 1280. St Walpurgis' Church was first mentioned in a document in 1494 when it was reconstructed and extended. Since 1500, both churches have hardly been changed structurally. The many similarities include the appearance and are applied to the church and village seals.

St Walpurgis' Church was built on pre-existing foundation walls and walls of a predecessor church. The vicarage and the gateway to the church are located next to it. The aisleless church is built of rubble stone masonry. The rectangular nave with a three-sided choir was built in 1478, and the west tower bears an inscription with the date 1494. Alterations were made in the 18th century and 1851–1852. Restorations were carried out in 1952 and 1993–1995. The tower has a pointed arch portal and curtain arch windows, while the nave has pointed arch windows and the choir has tracery windows. The interior is finished with a wooden barrel vault and surrounded by a two-storey wooden gallery from 1739.

== Interior ==
In the east is a neo-Gothic pulpit altar with pinnacles and tracery. In the tower room is a Romanesque baptismal font with a round-arched frieze on the basin. There is another baptismal font from 1739 in the choir. A Late Gothic St James altar from the beginning of the 16th century is now set up in the St James chapel at the bottom of the tower. The central shrine of the winged altar shows carved figures of Saints Nicholas, James and Walpurgis. The open wings show scenes from the life of St James on their inner sides. In the choir, there are coloured stained-glass windows with biblical motifs from 1908. An altar crucifix was created in the first half of the 18th century. A gravestone for a knight of Großengottern is preserved on the outer northern portal.

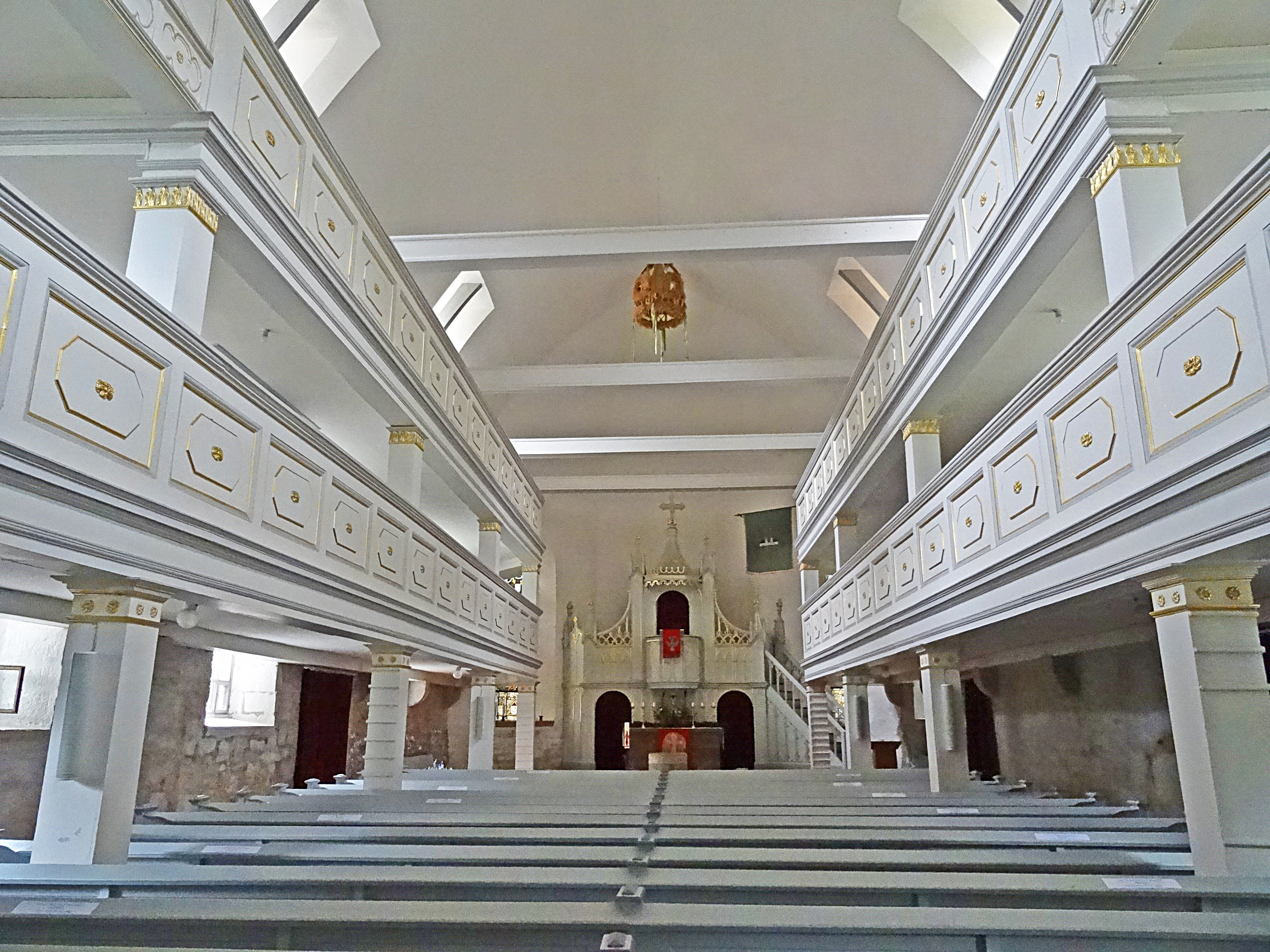
Interior view

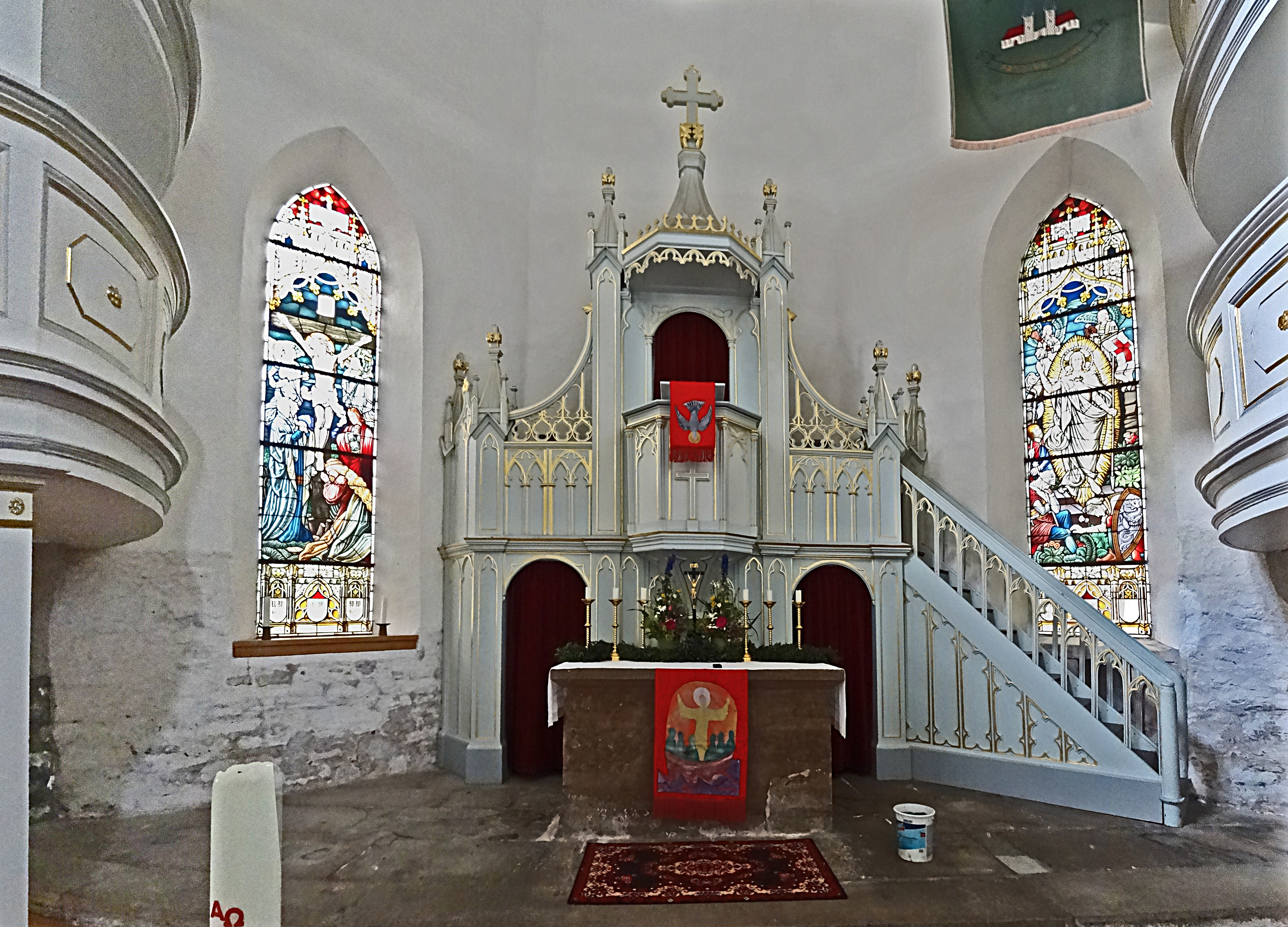
The altar

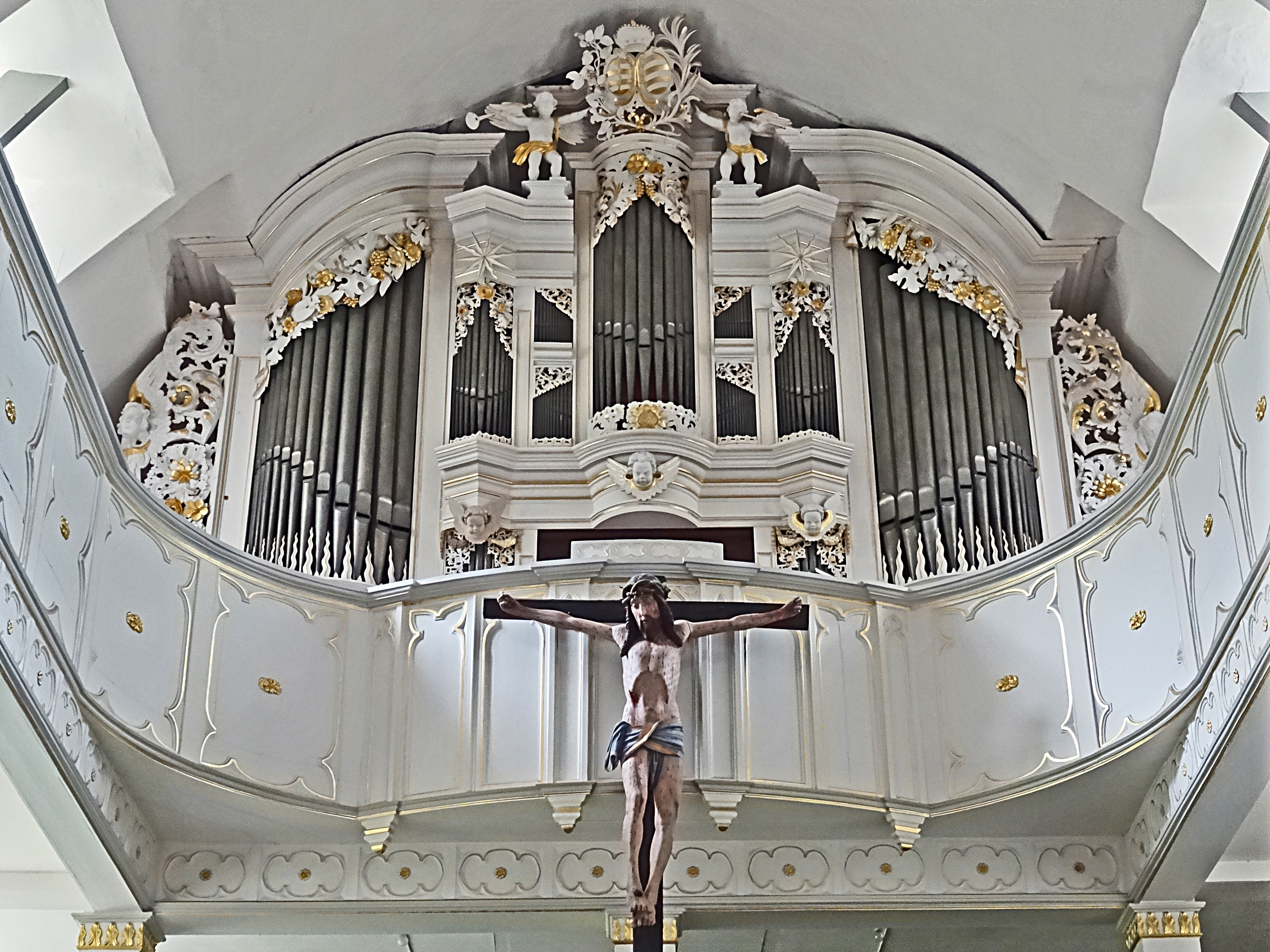
The Trost organ

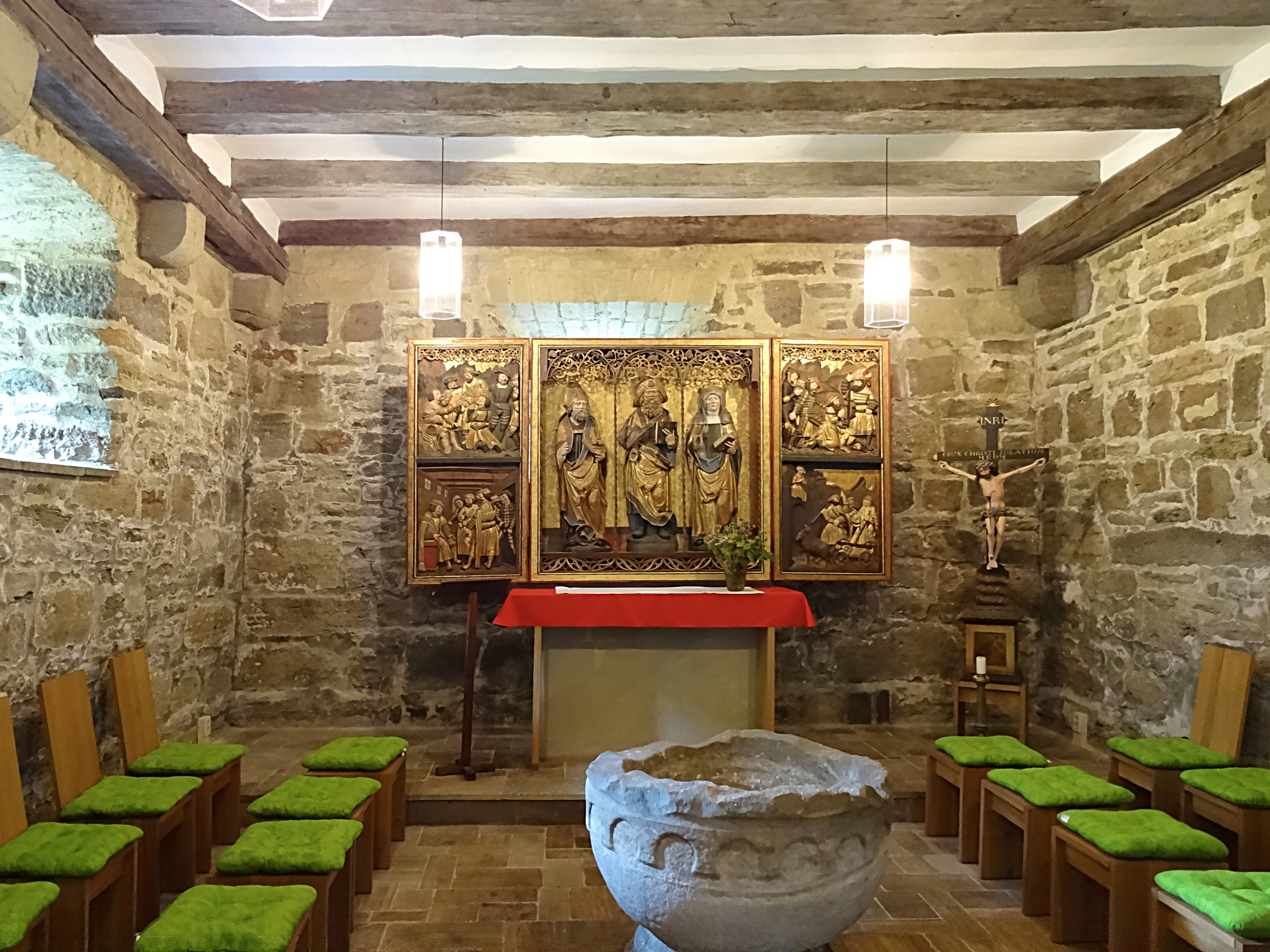
St James chapel

== Organ ==
Since 1717, the church has had a valuable organ by Tobias Heinrich Gottfried Trost with 26 stops on two manuals and pedal. A special feature is the arrangement of some of the stops above the manuals. In 1848–1849, Ernst Siegfried Hesse reworked the actions and the manuals and replaced individual stops. In 1878, the organ suffered damage from a lightning strike. Friedrich Petersilie restored the organ and replaced some stops. A proposal for a fundamental change of the organ remained unrealised. In the years 1940–1947, Rudolf Kühn restored the organ under the guidance of Rudolf von Beckerath. In 1999, the organ was restored by Eule Orgelbau Bautzen according to the original stop list, which reads:

I Main division CD–c^{3}
1	Große Quintathöne	16′	(T) / (n)
2	Principal	8′	(T)
3	Viol di Gamba	8′	(T) / (n)
4	Bordun	8′	(T) / (H)
5	Principal	4′	(T)
6	Gemshorn	4′	(n)
7	Groß Quinta	3′	(T) / (n)
8	Nassatt	3′	(T) / (n)
9	Supraoctava	2′	(T)
10	Sesquialtera	1 3/5′	(n)
11	Groß Mixtura IV		(T) / (n)
12	Trompete	8′	(n)

II Chest division CD–c^{3}
13	Lieblich Gedackt	8′	(T)
14	Principal	4′	(T)
15	Fledouse Doppelt	4′	(T) / (n)
16	Quinta	3′	(n)
17	Octava	2′	(T) / (n)
18	Mixtur III		(n)

Pedal CD–c^{1}
19	Subbaß	16′
20	Groß Viol di Gamb Baß	16′
21	Quintathön-Baß (= No. 1)	16′
22	Principal Baß	8′
23	Bordun-Baß (= No. 4)	8′
24	Octav-Baß (= No. 5)	4′
25	Posaunen Baß	16′
26	Trompeten-Baß (= No. 12)	8′

- Effect stop: Cymbelstern in C, Cymbelstern in G
- Couplers:: manual coupler, pedal coupler – I, pedal coupler – II.
- Subsidiary stops and auxiliaries: tremulant, shutoff valve
- Annotations:

(T) = stop wholly or partially by Tobias Heinrich Gottfried Trost (1716)
(H) = stop wholly or partially by Ernst Siegfried Hesse (1849)
(n) = stop wholly or partially new (1997)

== Bibliography ==
- Dehio, Georg (1998). Handbuch der deutschen Kunstdenkmäler. Thüringen (in German). München/Berlin: Deutscher Kunstverlag. p. 533. ISBN 3-422-03050-6.
