= Wolfgang Graf von Blücher =

German paratrooper (1917–1941)

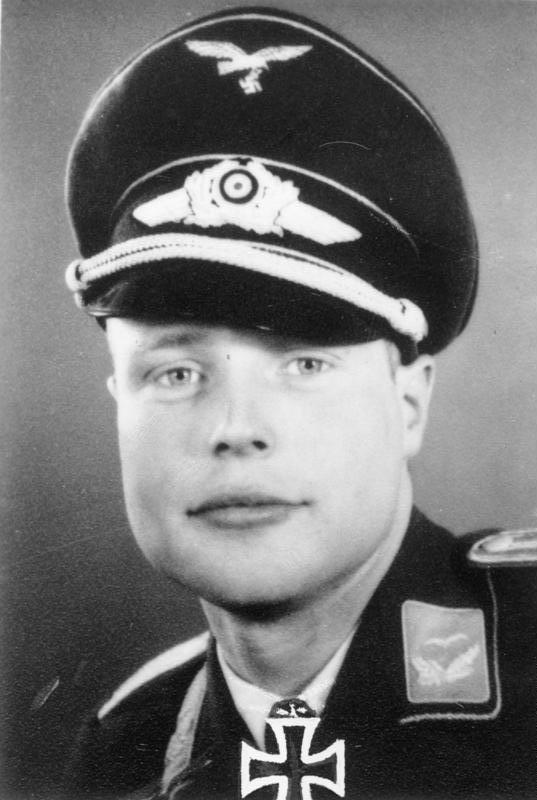
- Wolfgang Graf von Blücher
- Born: 31 January 1917; Altengottern
- Died: 21 May 1941 (aged 24); Iraklion, Crete
- Burial place: German War Cemetery at Maleme
- Military career
- Allegiance: Nazi Germany
- Branch: Heer; Luftwaffe
- Service years: 1934–35; 1937–41
- Rank: Oberleutnant of the Reserves
- Unit: Fallschirmjäger-Regiment 1
- Conflicts: World War II: Norwegian Campaign; Battles of Narvik; Battle of the Netherlands; Battle of Crete †
- Awards: Knight's Cross of the Iron Cross

Wolfgang Henner Peter Lebrecht Graf von Blücher (31 January 1917 – 21 May 1941) was a highly decorated Oberleutnant of the Reserves in the Fallschirmjäger during World War II. He was also a recipient of the Knight's Cross of the Iron Cross. The Knight's Cross of the Iron Cross, and its variants were the highest awards in the military and paramilitary forces of Nazi Germany during World War II. Graf von Blücher was one of three brothers who were killed during the Battle of Crete, all three of them on 21 May 1941.

== Awards and decorations ==
- Fallschirmschützenabzeichen
- Iron Cross (1939)
  - 2nd Class (18 April 1940)
  - 1st Class (24 May 1940)
- Knight's Cross of the Iron Cross on 24 May 1940 as Leutnant of the Reserves and Zugführer (platoon leader) in the 2./Fallschirmjäger-Regiment 1
