= Günther Witschurke =

German composer and music educator

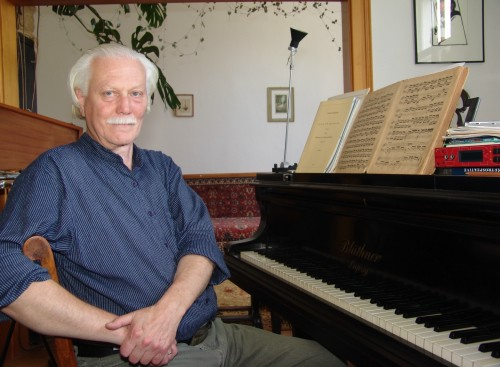
Günther Witschurke, in July 2007

Günther Witschurke (19 July 1937 − 4 July 2017) was a German composer and music educator.

== Life ==
Born in Dresden, Witschurke studied in Dresden with Alois Bambula and completed his studies with the Staatsexamen. He used his experience as a trombone player in various orchestras as a basis for external composition studies with the professors Karl-Rudi Griesbach, Hans-Hendrik Wehding and Fritz Geißler in Dresden.

Since 1978 Witschurke had been based in Altenburg. Until 1989 he was employed as trombonist at the Landeskapelle there. Since then he has been working as a freelance composer and music teacher. His works have not only been performed in many German cities, but have also been made known abroad (performances in Hungary, Bulgaria, France, Ireland, Israel, Austria, Spain, Great Britain, Switzerland, the Netherlands and the United States). Since 1990, the chamber music ensemble Eccolo has been grouped around the composer and is committed to the promotion of his works. In 2010 Witschurke was awarded the culture prize of the city of Altenburg.

Witschurke died after a long illness in Altenburg at the age of 79.

== Work ==
Witschurke's extensive oeuvre comprises over 180 works, including operas, ballets, orchestral works, choral works and symphonies, solo concertos, chamber music, organ works and songs. Some of his works were lost in the fire of the Altenburg Castle in 1987.

=== Stage work ===
- Aschenputtel, Schauspielmusik op. 12 (1974, world premiere 1974)
- Der Selbstmörderklub, Ballet op. 42 (1987)
- Mann im Mohn, Spieloper for children op. 97 (1994, UA 1995)
- Amor und Psyche, Chamber orchestra op. 98 (1994, UA 1995)
- Monadenoper, große Oper op. 100 (1994)

=== Concerts ===
- Posaunenkonzert op. 16 (1975)
- Paukenkonzert op. 17 (1976, UA 1981)
- Violinkonzert op. 37 (1986, UA 1989)
- Tripelkonzert für Englischhorn, Bassklarinette, Kontrafagott und Streichorchester op. 58 (1990, UA 1992)

=== Orchestral works ===
- Sarabande (first version) op. 6 (1968, UA 1968)
- Dramatische Ouvertüre op. 8 (1971, UA 1971)
- Marienbildnis op. 36 (1986, UA 1996)
- Vierte Sinfonie op. 45 ("Altenburger Sinfonie") (1987, UA 1989)
- Die Glasfenster von Jerusalem op. 116 (1997, UA 2002)
- Motette für Kammerorchester in Memoriam Josquin des Prés (1998, UA 1998)
- Ground Zero op. 152 (2002)

=== Chamber music ===
- Aus einer Träne eine Perle machen for speakers, woodwinds, strings and glockenspiel op. 38 (1986, UA 1986)
- Streichquartett op. 50 (1989, UA 1990)
- Eccolo for seven woodwinds op. 61 (1991, UA 1991)
- sans nom for four woodwinds op. 71 (1992, UA 1992)
- Melos for bassoon and three low strings op. 76 (1992)
- Requiem für Käthe Kollwitz for violin, piano, synthesizer and percussion op. 91 (1993, UA 1995)
- Lasst uns nun gehen gen Bethlehem for chamber orchestra and speaker op. 120 (1997, UA 1997)
- Collage avec Choral for trumpet, trombone, organ, xylophone and glockenspiel op. 139 (2000, UA 2000)
- Collage avec chant for organ, trumpet, viola, cello, glockenspiel and cabaza op. 153 (2003, UA 2003)
- Gloria in exelsis deo for organ, trumpet, flute and glockenspiel op. 161 (2005, UA 2005)
- Pentaton for piano, flute, cello, glockenspiel and gong op. 174 (2007, UA 2007)
- Friedensgebet for organ, two trombones, tuba, soprano voice, timpani, glockenspiel and gong op. 178 (2009, UA 2009)
- ∞ for organ, two trombones, tuba, soprano voice, timpani, glockenspiel and gong op. 180 (2010, UA 2010)
- NY for organ, trumpet, viola, flute, timpani, xylophone, glockenspiel and percussion op. 181 (2010)

=== Choral music ===
- Die Glocken von Chatyn for Choir and Orchestra op. 23 (1980, UA 1989)
- Messe der Demut for mixed choir and orchestra op. 72 (1992, UA 1994)
- Krippenspiel (Weihnachtsgeschichte) for children choir, four recorders, organ, percussion and speaker op. 84 (1993, UA 1993)
- DO NO PA for mixed choir, organ, trumpet, timpani and glockenspiel (1999, UA 1999)
- Legende for girls choir op. 138 (1999, UA 2000)
- „Dem Herrn will ich singen und spielen“ for brass ensemble, organ, timpani, glockenspiel, gong, tubular bell and mixed choir op. 164 (2005)
- ...höre meine Stimme... for three part girls choir and organ op. 170 (2007, UA 2007)
- Passion. Das Leiden unseres Herrn Jesus Christus nach dem Matthäus-Evangelium for mixed choir, speaker, instrumental ensemble and organ op. 171 (2007, UA 2008)

=== Music for brass instruments ===
- Marienbildnis for four trombones op. 26 (1982, UA 1984)
- Passacaglia op. 55 (1989, UA 1990)
- Die fünfte Posaune op. 57 (1990, UA 1991)
- Die sechste Posaune op. 64 (1991, UA 1991)
- Die siebte Posaune op. 80 (1993, UA 1993)
- Drei Begegnungen for brass orchestra, organ and timpani op. 95 (1994, UA 1995)
- Selig sind die Sanftmütigen for four trombones op. 124 (1998, UA 1998)
- DEUS NOSTER REFUGIUM for brass orchestra, organ and percussion op. 141 (2001, UA 2001)

=== Solo pieces and duos ===
- Miniature für Posaune und Klavier op. 9 (1971, UA 1971)
- Klavierbuch für Eszter und Vera op. 21 (1978, UA 1992)
- Guernica für Klavier op. 35 (1986, UA 1987)
- Hommage à Johann Ludwig Krebs, Toccata für Orgel solo op. 53 (1989, UA 1990)
- Hymnen für Orgel (ohne Pedal) und Fagott op. 117 (1997, UA 2000)
- Tränenloses Requiem für Orgel solo op. 78a (1999, UA 1999)
- Lamentation for New York für Orgel solo op. 146 (2001)
- Construction für Orgel solo op. 147 (2002, UA 2003)
- Trinité für Orgel solo op. 158 (2005, UA 2005)
- Series für Violine solo op. 182 (2011)

=== Lieder ===
- Fünf Duette for alto and horn with percussion op. 22 (1979, UA 1980)
- Novembertag for alto and piano op. 30 (1985, UA 1991)
- Harzmondzyklus for alto and piano op. 63 (1991, UA 1991)
- Die Liebe ist gestorben an dir for mezzo-soprano op. 73 (1992, UA 1993)
- Zwei koreanische Lieder for soprano and bassoon op. 101 (1995, UA 1995)
- Alles hat seine Zeit for organ and soprano op. 115 (1997, UA 1997)
- Lied an den toten Freund for piano, soprano, percussion and speaker op. 127 (1998, UA 1998)

== Literature ==
- Sebastian Hennig: Vom Kopf in die Hand an das Ohr – Die Musik des Günther Witschurke* . In Kunststoff. Das Kulturmagazin aus Mitteldeutschland, issue May/June/July 2011, pp. 58–59 .
- Herrmann, Matthias; Weiss, Stefan (ed.): Dresden und die avancierte Musik im 20. Jahrhundert. Teil III: 1966-1999. Laaber 2004, p. 127 f.
