= St Martin's Church, Großengottern =

St Martin's Church
- German: St. Martini
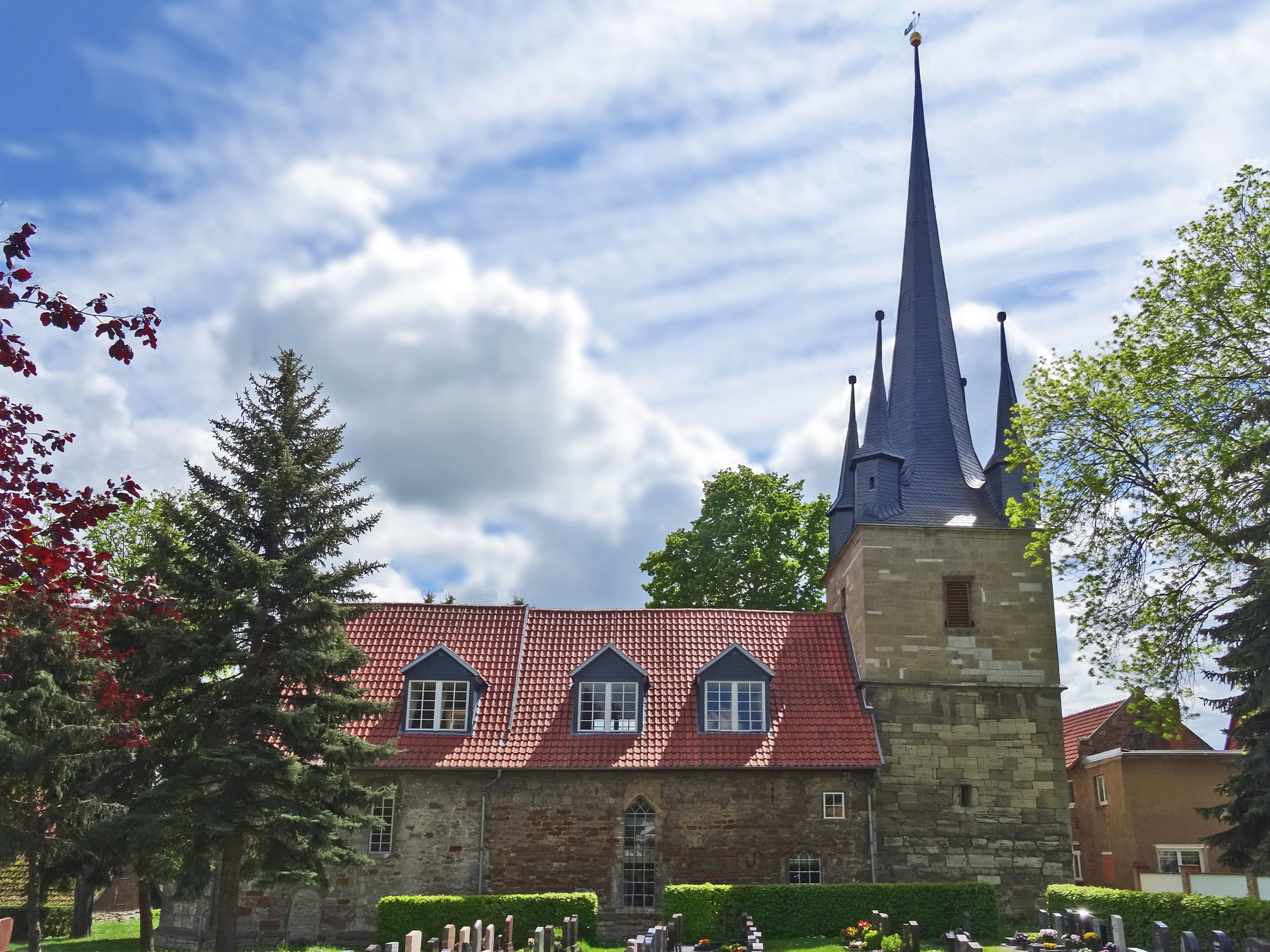
- View from north

- 51°09′01″N 10°34′08″E
- Location: Großengottern, Unstrut-Hainich-Kreis, Thuringia
- Country: Germany
- Denomination: Lutheran
- Previous denomination: Roman Catholic

History
- Status: Parish church
- Dedication: Martin of Tours

Architecture
- Style: Late Gothic

St Martin's Church (German: St.-Martini-Kirche) in the lower part of the village of Großengottern in Thuringia, Germany, is a Late Gothic church building. Today, it is a Lutheran parish church.

== History ==
Like St Walpurgis' Church in the upper part of Großengottern, which is also Late Gothic in style, St Martin's Church is older than the written records indicate. A parish priest has been resident in Großengottern since 1280. St Martin's Church, the older church, is documented in 1318. Since 1500, both churches have hardly been changed structurally. The many similarities include the appearance which is applied to the church and village seals. The choir and tower were built around 1500, further alterations took place in 1617–1647, and the east window was changed in the 19th century.

== Architecture and interior ==
The building is a rubble-stone construction with a three-sided choir and an indented west tower with a pointed spire and corner towers. The church is entered through a pointed arch portal in the south with crossed bars. The room, closed off with a wooden barrel vault, is surrounded by a three-sided, two-storey gallery from 1698. At the same time, the pulpit altar was created and furnished with wooden statues of the apostles Peter and Paul. The unusually large organ is a work by Johann Michael Hesse the Younger from 1842 with 18 stops on two manuals and pedal.

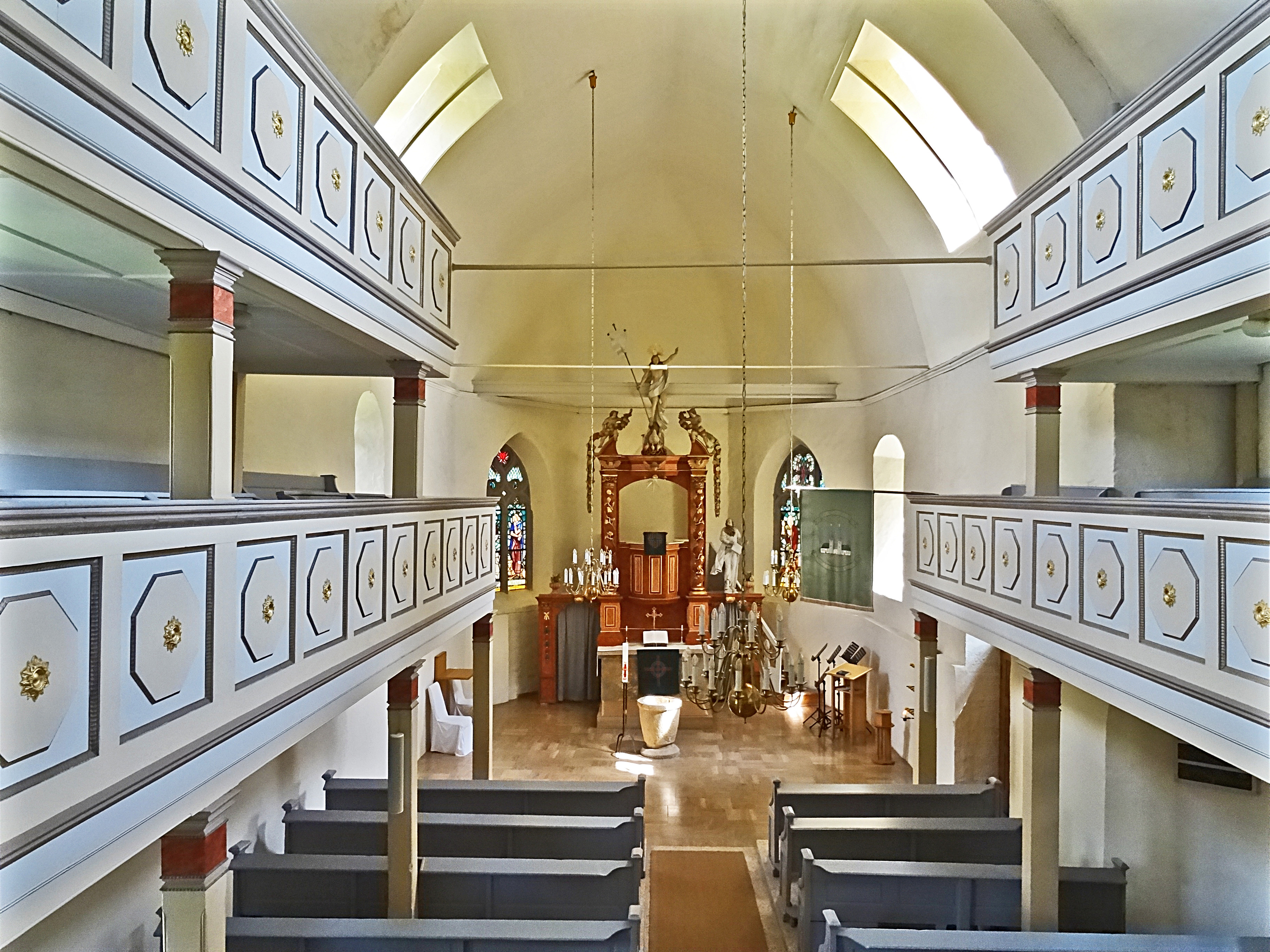
Interior view

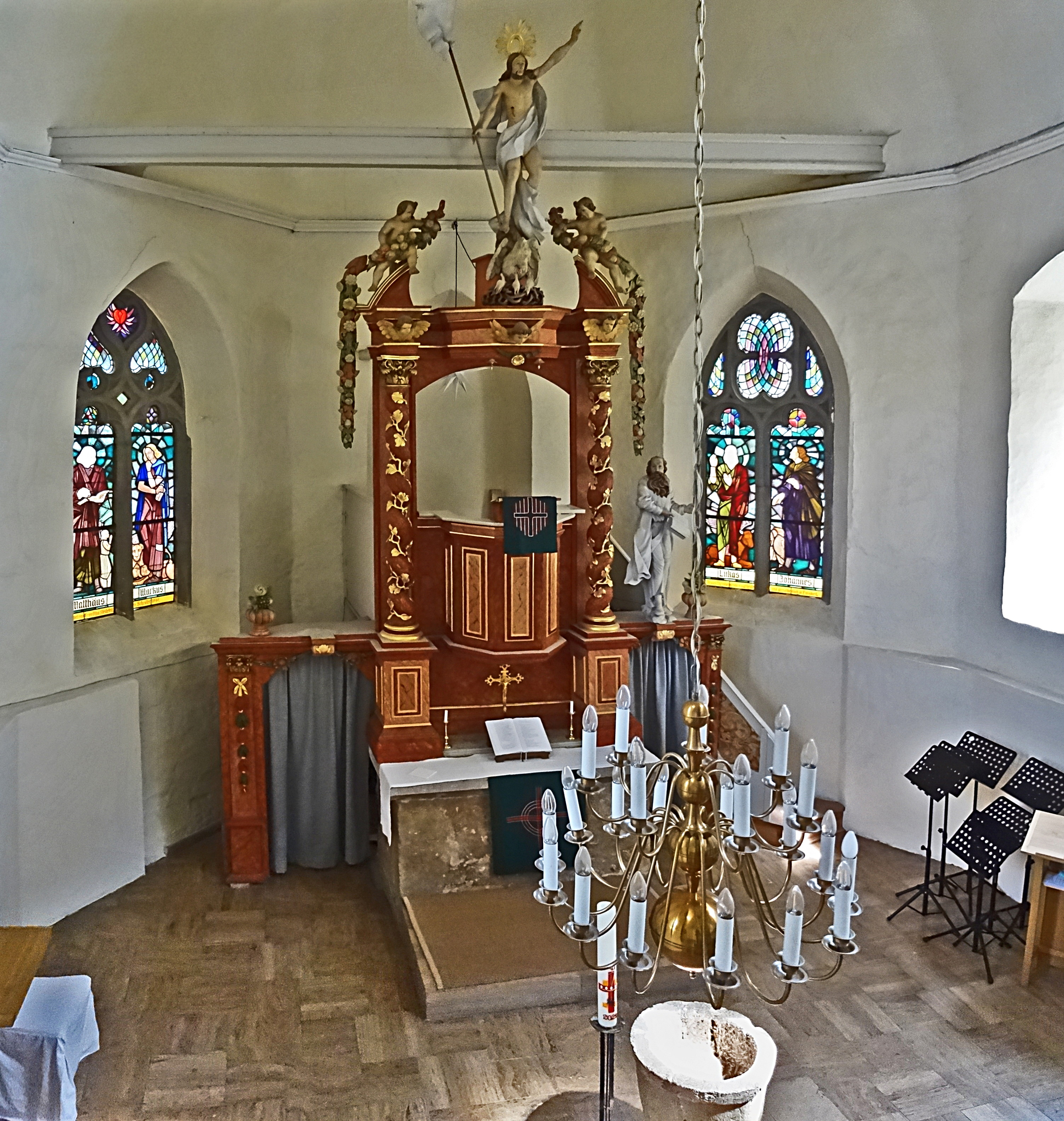
The altar

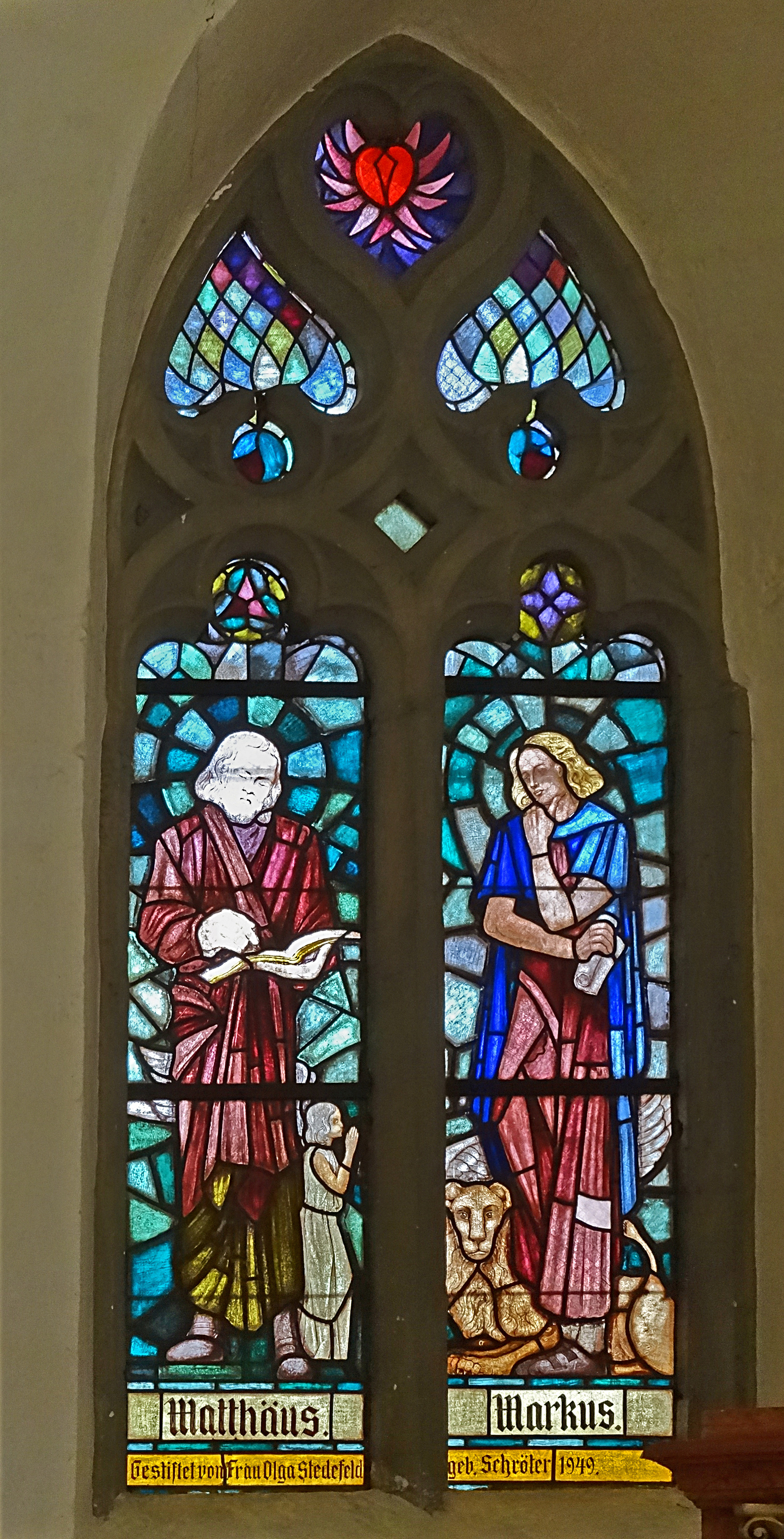
Left altar window

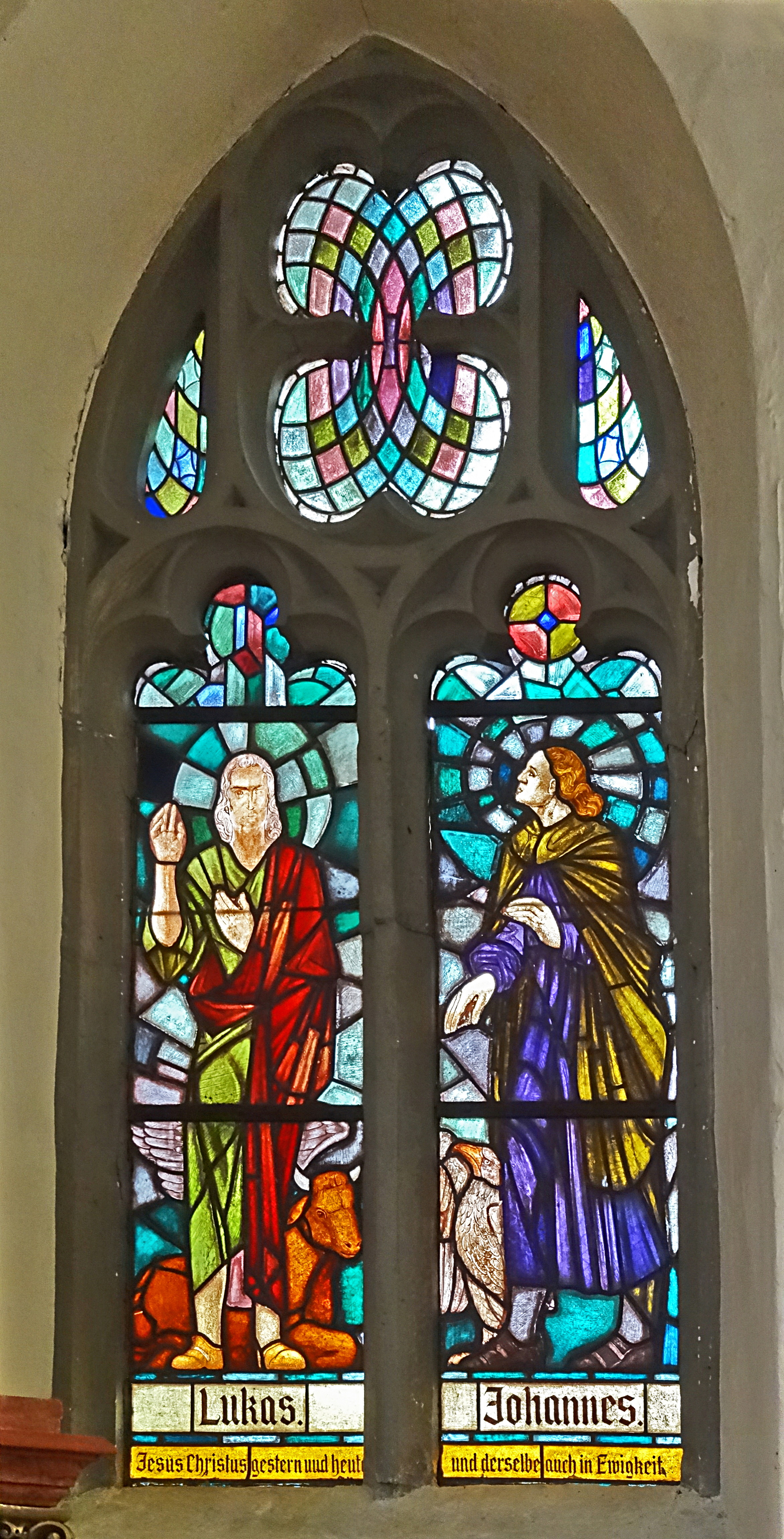
Right altar window

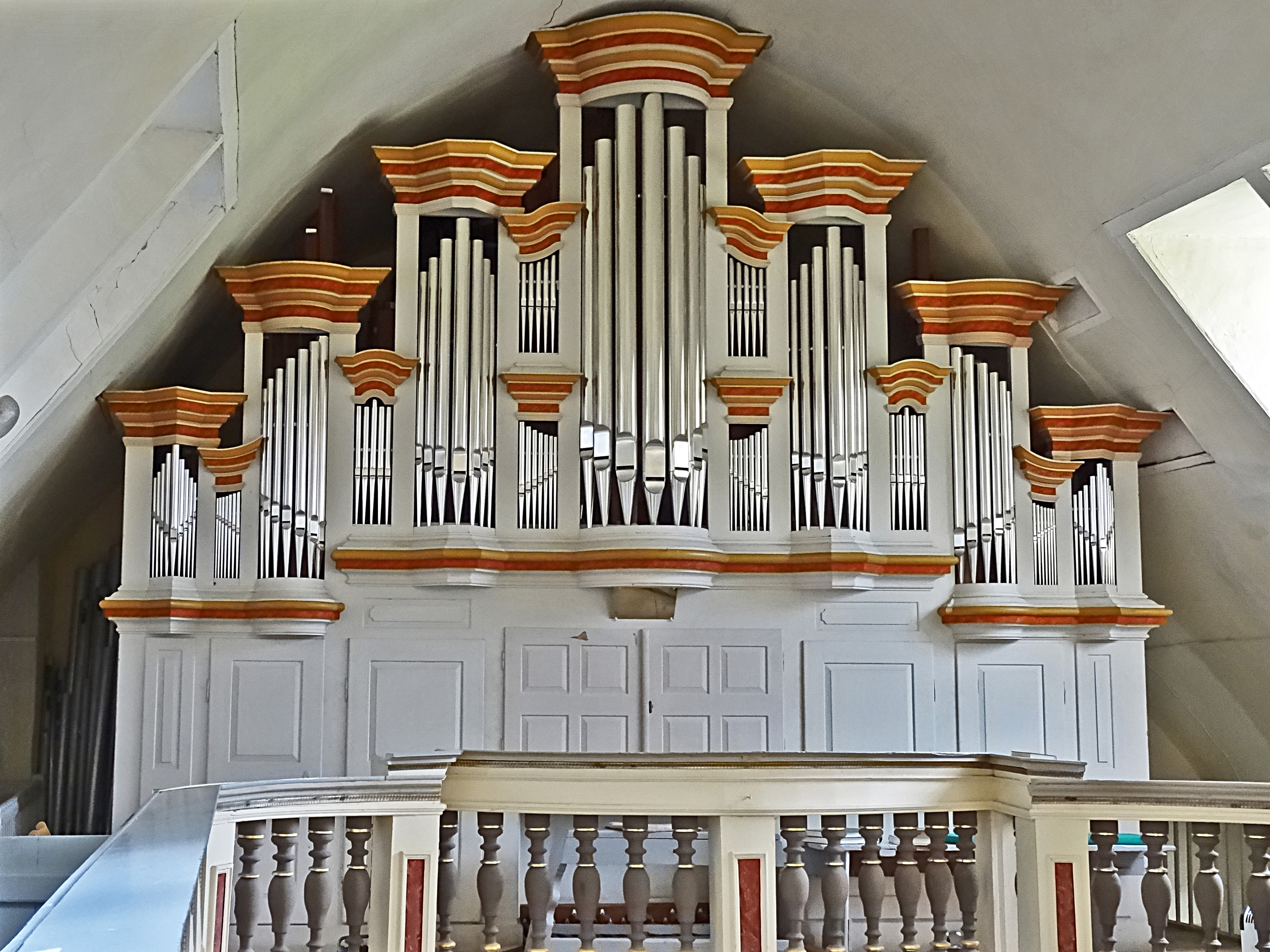
The Hesse organ

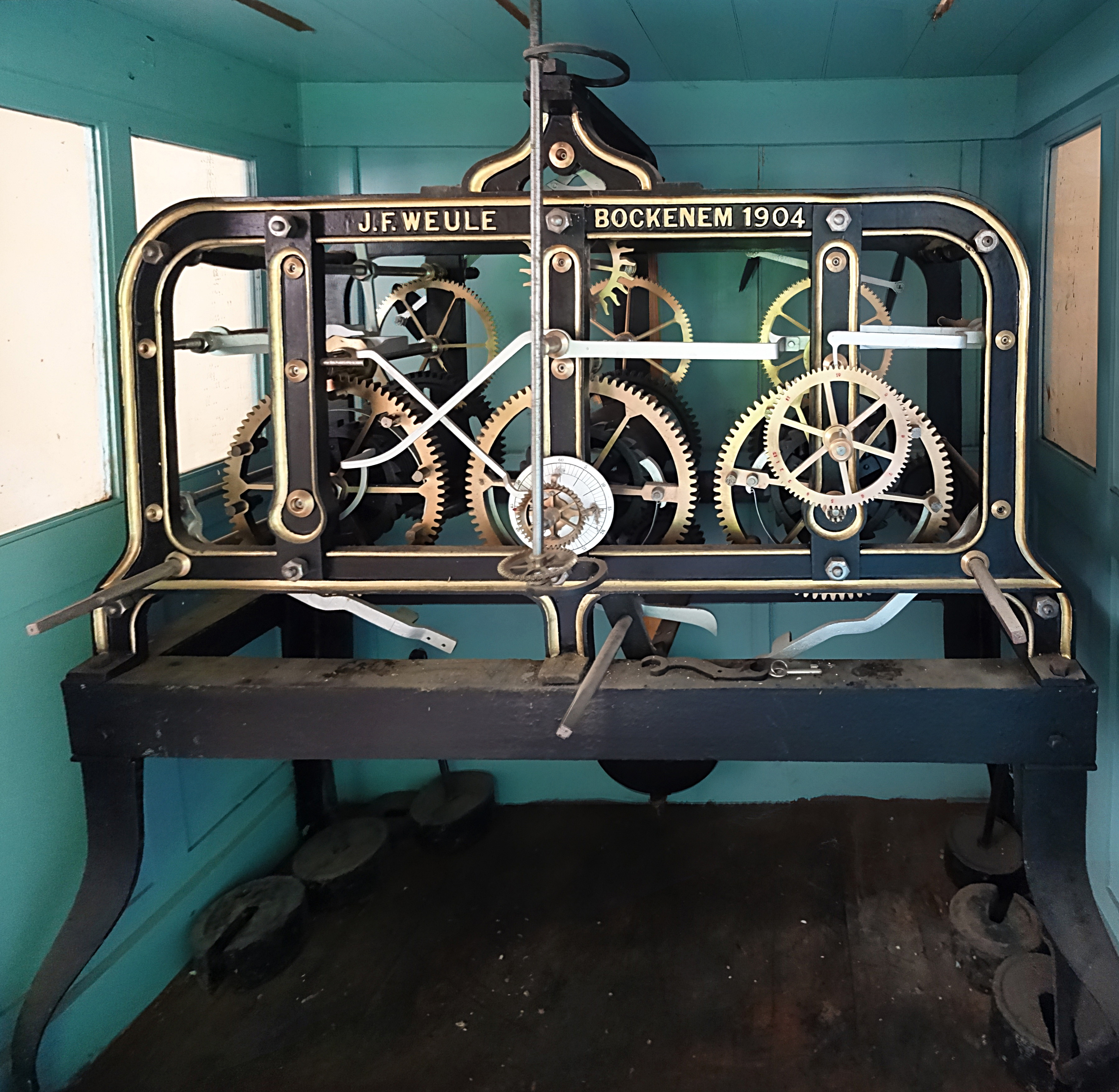
The tower clock (1904)

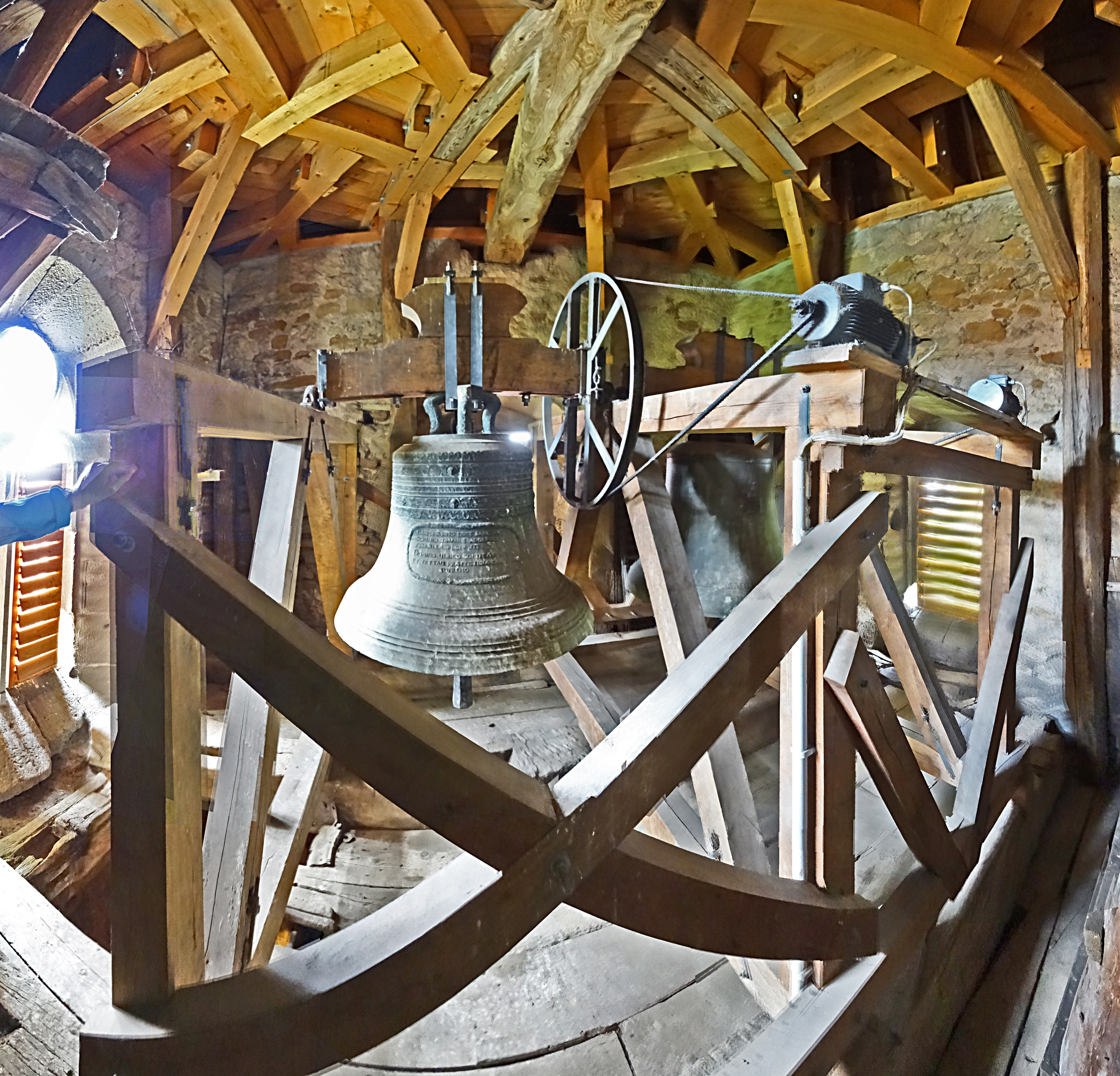
The bell

== Bibliography ==
- Dehio, Georg (1998). Handbuch der deutschen Kunstdenkmäler. Thüringen (in German). München/Berlin: Deutscher Kunstverlag. pp. 533 f. ISBN 3-422-03050-6.
