= Karl-Rudi Griesbach =

German composer, librettist, dramaturge, music critic and academic teacher

Karl-Rudi Griesbach (14 June 1916 – 8 May 2000) was a German composer, librettist, dramaturge, music critic and academic teacher.

== Life ==
Born in Breckerfeld, Westphalia, Griesbach attended a Gymnasium in Hamburg and subsequently studied composition with Philipp Jarnach and conducting with Eugen Körner at the Hochschule für Musik und Tanz Köln from 1937. After completing his studies in 1941 he served in the military in World War II and was taken prisoner of war by the Soviets in 1944, from which he was not released until 1949. The following year Griesbach settled in Dresden, where he lived until his death at age 83. In the years 1952 and 1953 he worked at a Berlin theater for a short time. He also wrote reviews and worked as a dramaturge at the Staatsoper Dresden. From 1952 to 1955, Griesbach taught at the Hochschule für Musik Carl Maria von Weber. From 1966 he worked there, first as a lecturer, from 1968 as professor of composition, until he retired from teaching in 1981. Griesbach was awarded, among others, the Martin-Andersen-Nexö-Kunstpreis of the city of Dresden (1961), the Art Prize of the German Democratic Republic (1967) and the Patriotic Order of Merit (1976). Griesbach's wife Margrit appeared as a pianist and interpreted mainly works of her husband.

== Music ==
Griesbach always tried to write music that was relatively easy to understand. For this reason he took up suggestions from Béla Bartók and also from Arnold Schönberg, but in the end he did not completely break with tonality and was, on the whole, a rather conservative composer for his generation. His music is characterized by a concise rhythm, rather rough timbres and concise forms. In his works, Griesbach sometimes referred to political themes. At the beginning of the 1960s he was interested in foreign musical cultures and was also inspired by blues and African music. His Afrikanische Sinfonie (African Symphony), composed at that time, was a considerable success. His main focus is on stage works. In the GDR and especially in Dresden Griesbach was a respected composer, but after the reunification he was largely forgotten.

== Compositions ==
Griesbach's music was published by Verlag Neue Musik.

- Orchestral work
  - Kleine Sinfonie (1950)
  - Afrikanische Sinfonie (1963)
  - Sinfonie (67) in memory of the Great Socialist October Revolution (1967)
  - Ostinati for orchestra (1976)
  - Kontakte for orchestra (1978)
  - Szene for orchestra
  - Konzertante Musik für Klavier und Kammerorchester (1964)
- Stage works
  - Kolumbus, opera (1958)
  - Der Schwarze – der Weiße − und die Frau, opera (1963)
  - Belle und Armand, opera (1988)
  - Aulus und sein Papagei, opera (1982)
  - Kleider machen Leute, ballet (1954)
  - Schneewittchen, ballet (1956)
  - Reinecke Fuchs, ballet (1977)
  - Samson, ballet (c. 1980)
- Vocal music
  - Planetarisches Manifest, cantata after Johannes R. Becher for soprano, baritone, piano, choir and orchestra (1962)
  - Trinke Mut des reinen Lebens, for baritone, female choir and orchestra based on texts by Goethe (1981)
  - Song cycle, texts by Shakespeare, Brecht, and others
  - Folk song arrangements
- Piano and chamber music
  - String Quartet (1977)
  - Musik für Flöte und Streichtrio (1953)
  - Kleine Olympiade: Klavierstücke für die Jugend (1961)
  - blues-impressions, five piano pieces in jazz style (1962)
  - Partita for piano (1986)
