= Altengottern =

- Ortsteil of Unstrut-Hainich
- Interactive map of Altengottern
- Location within Germany Location within Thuringia
- Coordinates: 51°10′N 10°34′E
- Country: Germany
- State: Thuringia
- District: Unstrut-Hainich-Kreis
- Municipality: Unstrut-Hainich

Area
  - Total: 18.33 km^{2} (7.08 sq mi)
- Elevation: 175 m (574 ft)

Population (2017-12-31)
  - Total: 1,017
  - Density: 55.48/km^{2} (143.7/sq mi)
- Time zone: UTC+01:00 (CET)
  - Summer (DST): UTC+02:00 (CEST)
- Postal codes: 99991
- Dialling codes: 036022

Altengottern (German pronunciation: [ˈaltn̩ɡɔtɐn]) is a village and a former municipality in the Unstrut-Hainich-Kreis district of Thuringia, Germany. Since 1 January 2019, it is part of the municipality Unstrut-Hainich.

== See also ==
- Wolfgang Graf von Blücher
