= Weberstedt =

- Ortsteil of Unstrut-Hainich
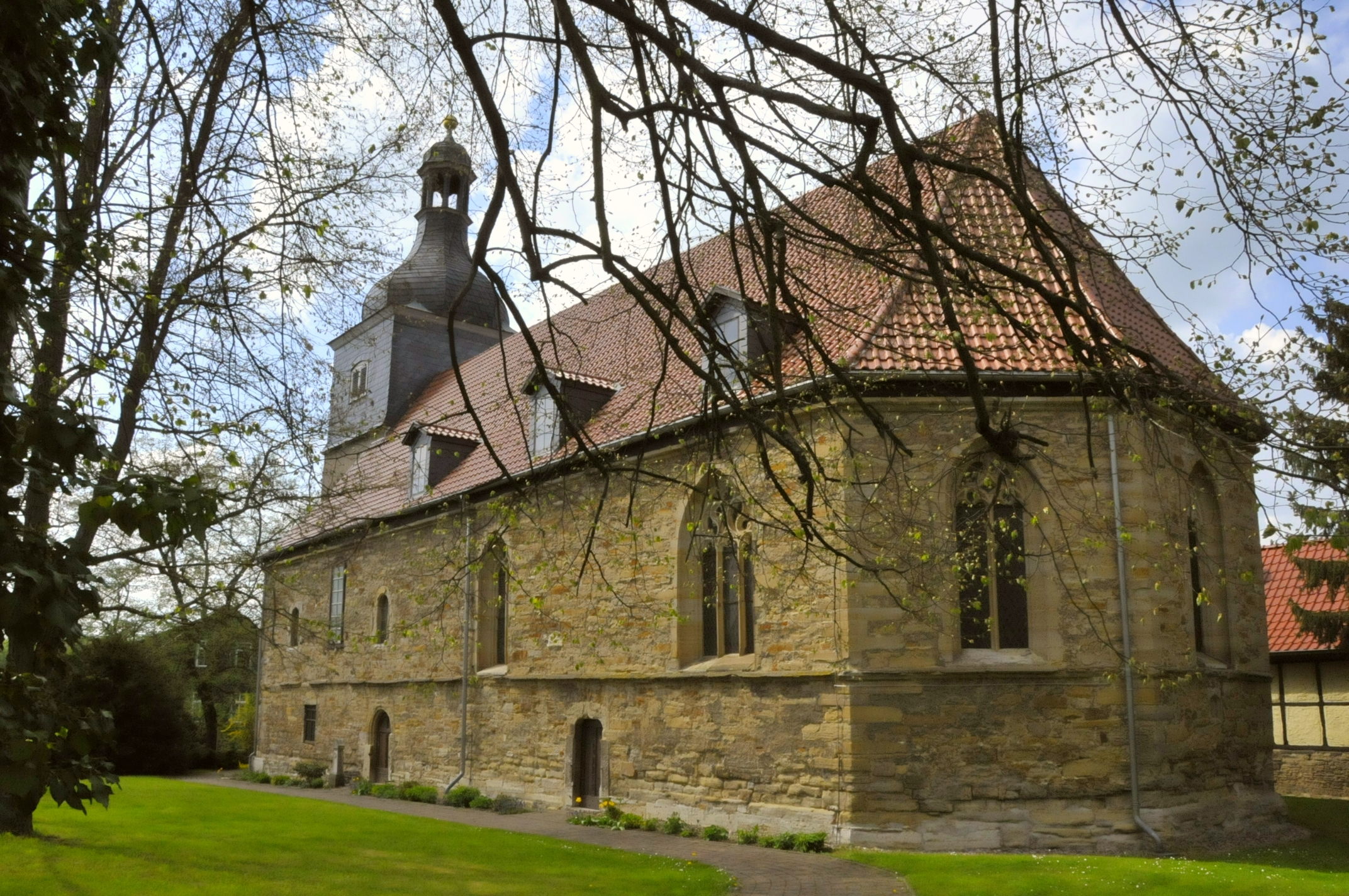
- Church of Saint Ulrich
- Interactive map of Weberstedt
- Location within Germany Location within Thuringia
- Coordinates: 51°6′N 10°30′E
- Country: Germany
- State: Thuringia
- District: Unstrut-Hainich-Kreis
- Municipality: Unstrut-Hainich

Area
  - Total: 18.36 km^{2} (7.09 sq mi)
- Elevation: 280 m (920 ft)

Population (2017-12-31)
  - Total: 597
  - Density: 32.5/km^{2} (84.2/sq mi)
- Time zone: UTC+01:00 (CET)
  - Summer (DST): UTC+02:00 (CEST)
- Postal codes: 99947
- Dialling codes: 036022

Weberstedt (German pronunciation: [ˈveːbɐʃtɛt]) is a village and a former municipality in the Unstrut-Hainich-Kreis district of Thuringia, Germany. Since 1 January 2019, it is part of the municipality Unstrut-Hainich.
