= Flarchheim =

- Ortsteil of Unstrut-Hainich
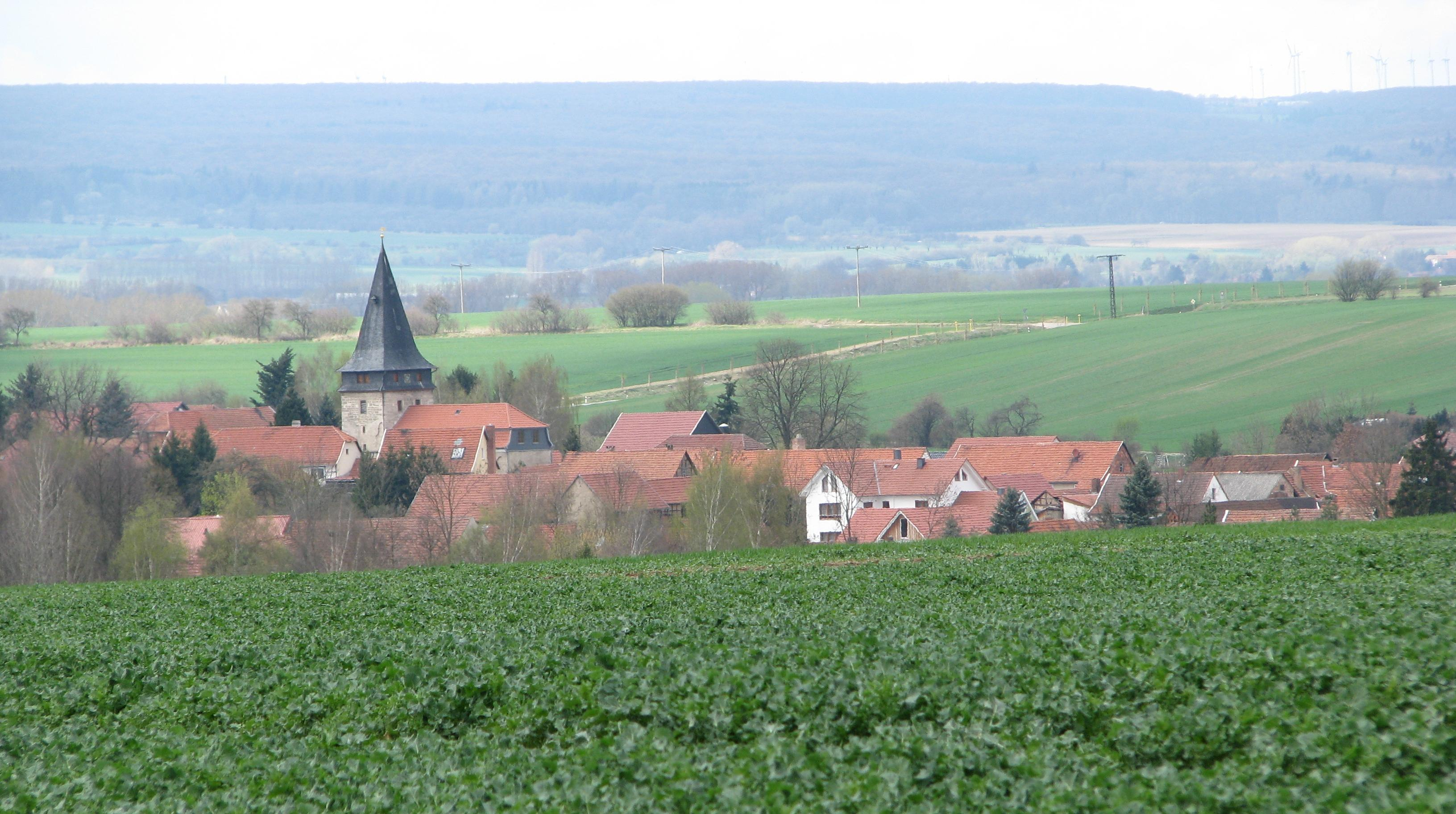
- Flarchheim seen from the southeast
- Interactive map of Flarchheim
- Location within Germany Location within Thuringia
- Coordinates: 51°7′N 10°28′E
- Country: Germany
- State: Thuringia
- District: Unstrut-Hainich-Kreis
- Municipality: Unstrut-Hainich

Area
  - Total: 11.86 km^{2} (4.58 sq mi)
- Elevation: 216 m (709 ft)

Population (2017-12-31)
  - Total: 417
  - Density: 35.2/km^{2} (91.1/sq mi)
- Time zone: UTC+01:00 (CET)
  - Summer (DST): UTC+02:00 (CEST)
- Postal codes: 99986
- Dialling codes: 036028
- Website: www.flarchheim.de

Flarchheim (German pronunciation: [ˈflaʁçhaɪm]) is a village and a former municipality in the Unstrut-Hainich-Kreis district of Thuringia, Germany. Since 1 January 2019, it is part of the municipality Unstrut-Hainich.

Flarchheim was the site of the Battle of Flarchheim on January 27, 1080, one of the very few times the Holy Roman Empire attempted to wage a midwinter military campaign in northern Europe.
