= Schönstedt =

- Ortsteil of Unstrut-Hainich
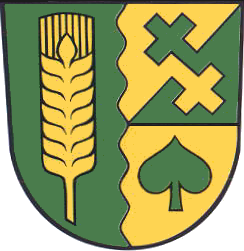
- Coat of arms
- Interactive map of Schönstedt
- Location within Germany Location within Thuringia
- Coordinates: 51°7′N 10°34′E
- Country: Germany
- State: Thuringia
- District: Unstrut-Hainich-Kreis
- Municipality: Unstrut-Hainich

Area
  - Total: 22.75 km^{2} (8.78 sq mi)
- Elevation: 188 m (617 ft)

Population (2022-12-31)
  - Total: 1,324
  - Density: 58.20/km^{2} (150.7/sq mi)
- Time zone: UTC+01:00 (CET)
  - Summer (DST): UTC+02:00 (CEST)
- Postal codes: 99947
- Dialling codes: 036022

Schönstedt (German pronunciation: [ˈʃøːnʃtɛt]) is a village and a former municipality in the Unstrut-Hainich-Kreis district of Thuringia, Germany. On 1 January 2024 it became part of the municipality Unstrut-Hainich.
