= Heroldishausen =

- Ortsteil of Unstrut-Hainich
- Interactive map of Heroldishausen
- Location within Germany Location within Thuringia
- Coordinates: 51°8′N 10°31′E
- Country: Germany
- State: Thuringia
- District: Unstrut-Hainich-Kreis
- Municipality: Unstrut-Hainich

Area
  - Total: 3.21 km^{2} (1.24 sq mi)
- Elevation: 207 m (679 ft)

Population (2017-12-31)
  - Total: 192
  - Density: 59.8/km^{2} (155/sq mi)
- Time zone: UTC+01:00 (CET)
  - Summer (DST): UTC+02:00 (CEST)
- Postal codes: 99991
- Dialling codes: 036022

Heroldishausen (German pronunciation: [heːʁɔldɪsˈhaʊzn̩]) is a village and a former municipality in the Unstrut-Hainich-Kreis district of Thuringia, Germany. Since 1 January 2019, it is part of the municipality Unstrut-Hainich.
