= Mülverstedt =

- Ortsteil of Unstrut-Hainich
- Interactive map of Mülverstedt
- Location within Germany Location within Thuringia
- Coordinates: 51°7′N 10°30′E
- Country: Germany
- State: Thuringia
- District: Unstrut-Hainich-Kreis
- Municipality: Unstrut-Hainich

Area
  - Total: 23.24 km^{2} (8.97 sq mi)
- Elevation: 220 m (720 ft)

Population (2017-12-31)
  - Total: 681
  - Density: 29.3/km^{2} (75.9/sq mi)
- Time zone: UTC+01:00 (CET)
  - Summer (DST): UTC+02:00 (CEST)
- Postal codes: 99947
- Dialling codes: 036022
- Website: www.muelverstedt.net

Mülverstedt (German pronunciation: [ˈmʏlvɐʃtɛt]) is a village and a former municipality in the Unstrut-Hainich-Kreis district of Thuringia, Germany. Since 1 January 2019, it is part of the municipality Unstrut-Hainich.
