= Schlotheim (Verwaltungsgemeinschaft) =

Municipal association in Thuringia, Germany

Coordinates: 51.250°N 10.667°E

Schlotheim is a former Verwaltungsgemeinschaft in the district of Unstrut-Hainich-Kreis in Thuringia, Germany. The seat of the Verwaltungsgemeinschaft was in Schlotheim. It was disbanded on 31 December 2019.

The Verwaltungsgemeinschaft Schlotheim consisted of the following municipalities:

1. Bothenheilingen
2. Issersheilingen
3. Kleinwelsbach
4. Körner
5. Marolterode
6. Neunheilingen
7. Obermehler
8. Schlotheim
