= Weinbergen =

- Municipality
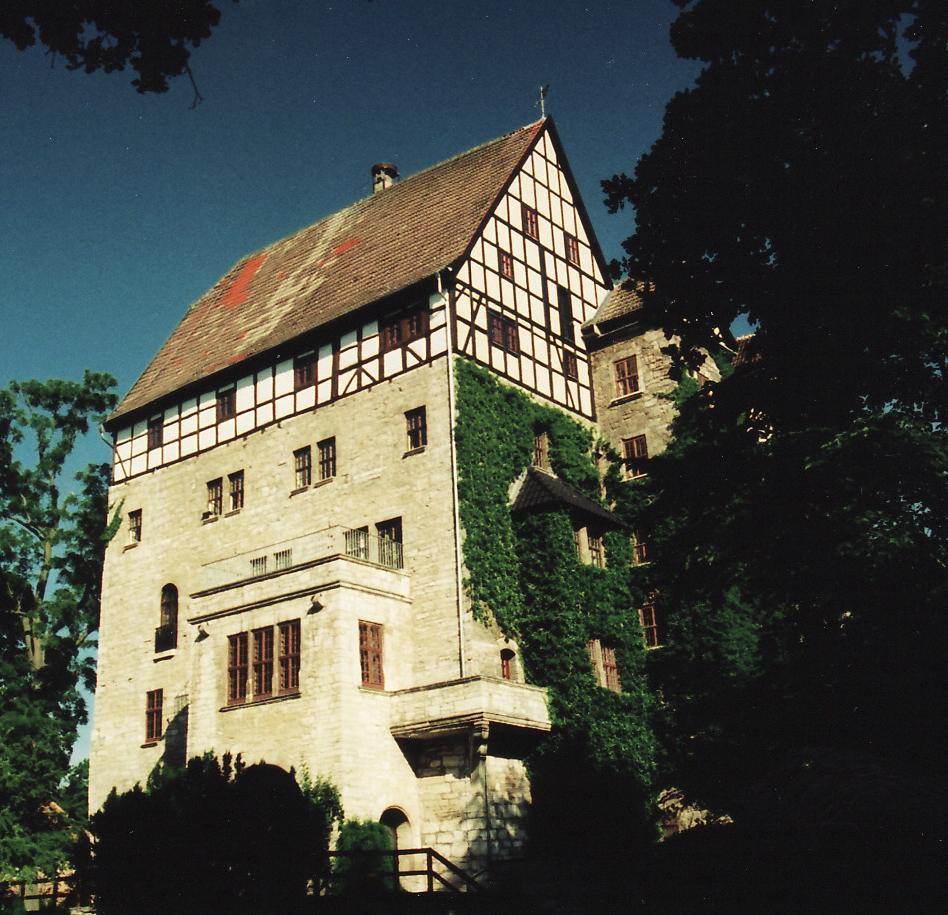
- Wasserschloss (Moated Castle) in Seebach
- Interactive map of Weinbergen
- Location within Germany Location within Thuringia
- Coordinates: 51°12′N 10°32′E
- Country: Germany
- State: Thuringia
- District: Unstrut-Hainich-Kreis
- Founded: 1994
- Disbanded: 2019-01-01
- Subdivisions: 4 villages

Area
  - Total: 43.77 km^{2} (16.90 sq mi)
- Elevation: 191 m (627 ft)

Population (2017-12-31)
  - Total: 3,068
  - Density: 70.09/km^{2} (181.5/sq mi)
- Time zone: UTC+01:00 (CET)
  - Summer (DST): UTC+02:00 (CEST)
- Postal codes: 99998
- Dialling codes: 03601
- Website: www.weinbergen.de

Weinbergen (German pronunciation: [ˈvaɪnˌbɛʁɡn̩]) is a former municipality in the Unstrut-Hainich-Kreis district of Thuringia, Germany. It was created on 30 June 1994 in the course of a territorial reform by the merger of the municipalities of Bollstedt, Grabe, Höngeda and Seebach. On 1 January 2019, Weinbergen was dissolved, and the four villages which it consisted of were incorporated into the territory of the town of Mühlhausen. The Seebach State Bird Protection Station, located in the former municipality, is known beyond the region.

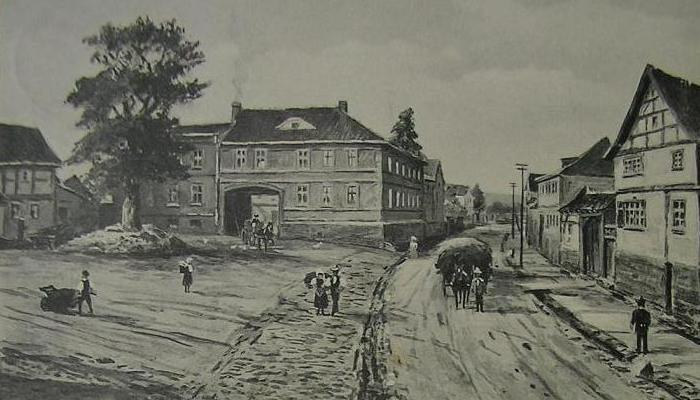
Großgrabe (part of Grabe, 1909)

== Geography ==
=== Location ===
The municipality of Weinbergen adjoined the urban area of Mühlhausen to the northwest. To the north-east it bordered on Körner, to the south-east on the administrative community of Unstrut-Hainich and to the west on the rural municipality of Vogtei. The municipality's altitude ranged from 182 m (597 ft) above NN on the Unstrut near Seebach to 389.8 m (1,279 ft) above NN on the Forstberg hill in the north.

=== Municipal structure ===
Weinbergen consisted of the four villages of Bollstedt, Grabe, Höngeda and Seebach. The municipal administration had its seat in Bollstedt.

=== Water bodies ===
The Unstrut and its tributaries Notter and Seebach flowed through the municipality of Weinbergen.

=== Transport ===
The Bundesstraße (federal highway) 247 in the section Mühlhausen–Bad Langensalza as well as the federal highway 249 connecting Mühlhausen with Sondershausen ran through the municipal area.

Bollstedt is connected to the city bus service of Mühlhausen.

The route of the disused Ebeleben–Mühlhausen railway line with the former stops at Bollstedt and Grabe ran in the northwest of the municipal area. The tracks and bridges were dismantled in 2007. The nearest connections to the railway network are in Seebach, with a DB Regio railway stop to the north-east of the village, and in Mühlhausen on the Gotha–Leinefelde railway line.

=== Climate ===
A weather station with a longer series of measurements is located in the village of Grabe. With an annual mean temperature of 8.7 °C (47.7 °F) and an average annual precipitation of 565 millimetres (22.2 in), the climate of Grabe is relatively warm, but already dry.

== History ==
The municipality of Weinbergen was created through the voluntary merger of the formerly independent municipalities of Bollstedt, Grabe, Höngeda and Seebach in the course of the first Thuringian territorial reform on 1 July 1994. On 8 March 2018, the municipal council decided by a narrow majority to incorporate Weinbergen into Mühlhausen as of 1 January 2019. The mayor during its entire existence was Hans-Martin Menge.

== Miscellaneous ==
With 99998, Weinbergen, together with Körner, had the highest postcode in the Federal Republic of Germany; the number 99999 was not assigned to any municipality, but was used by Deutsche Post AG in a special postmark in the village of Körner on 9 September 1999.
