= Grabe, Mühlhausen =

Grabe
- Ortsteil of Mühlhausen
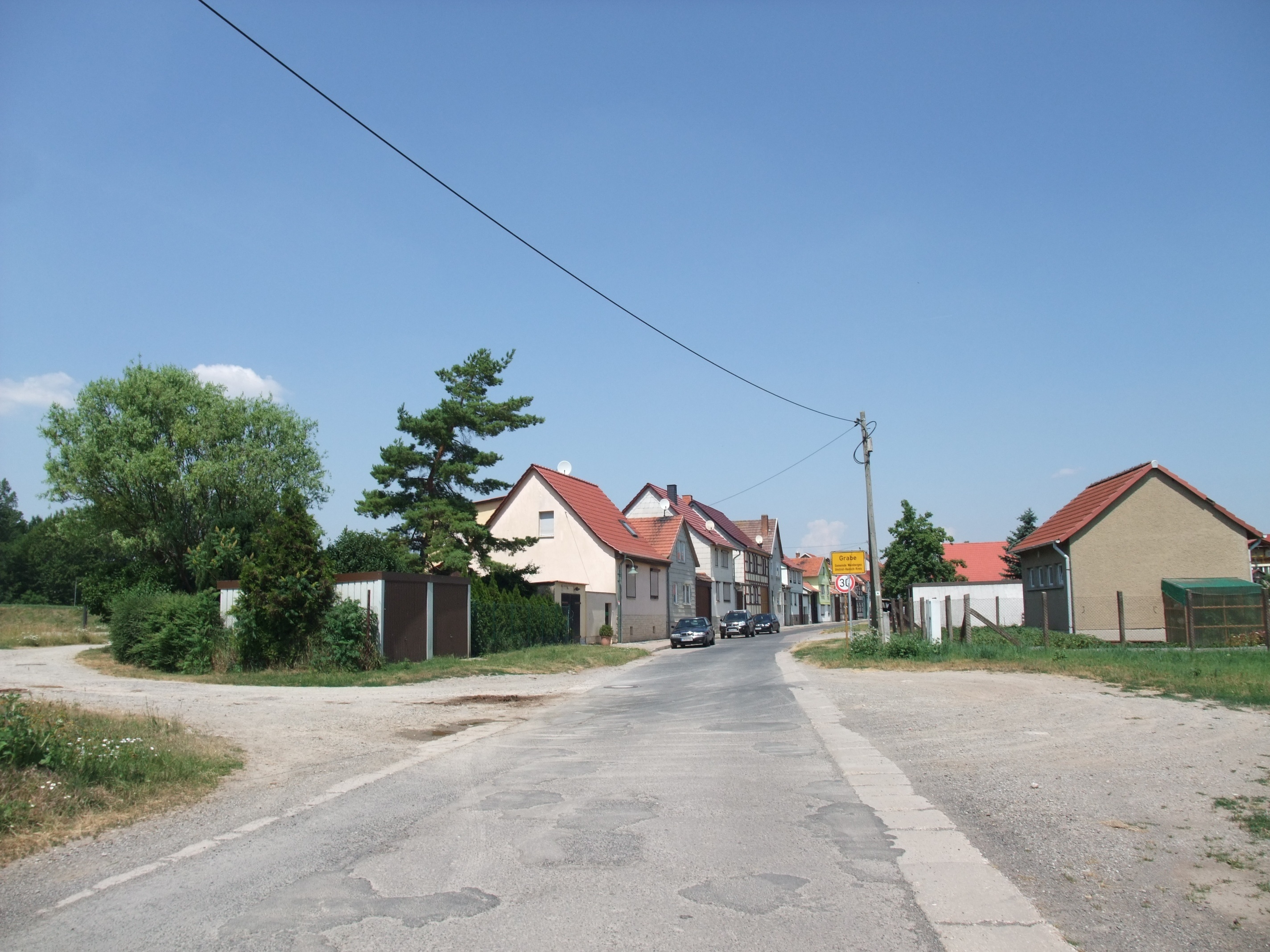
- Entrance to the village
- Interactive map of Grabe
- Location within Germany Location within Thuringia
- Coordinates: 51°13′34″N 10°32′30″E
- Country: Germany
- State: Thuringia
- District: Unstrut-Hainich-Kreis
- Town: Mühlhausen
- First mentioned: 997

Government
  - Mayor: Karsten Lutze
- Elevation: 199 m (653 ft)

Population (March 2021)
  - Total: 645
- Time zone: UTC+01:00 (CET)
  - Summer (DST): UTC+02:00 (CEST)
- Postal codes: 99998
- Dialling codes: 03601
- Vehicle registration: UH, LSZ, MHL
- Website: muehlhausen.de

Grabe (German pronunciation: [ˈɡʁaːbə]) is a village and a quarter of the town of Mühlhausen in Thuringia, central Germany. It consists of the settlements Kleingrabe (Smaller Grabe) and Großgrabe (Greater Grabe).

== Geography ==
Grabe is located 7 kilometres (4.3 mi) east of Mühlhausen. The Volkenroda Abbey in the neighbourhood can easily be reached on foot from Grabe. The village is connected to the Landesstraße (state road) 249. The terrain is hilly and lies on the edge of the Thuringian Basin and the Unstrut lowlands. The stream Notter flows through Grabe.

== History ==
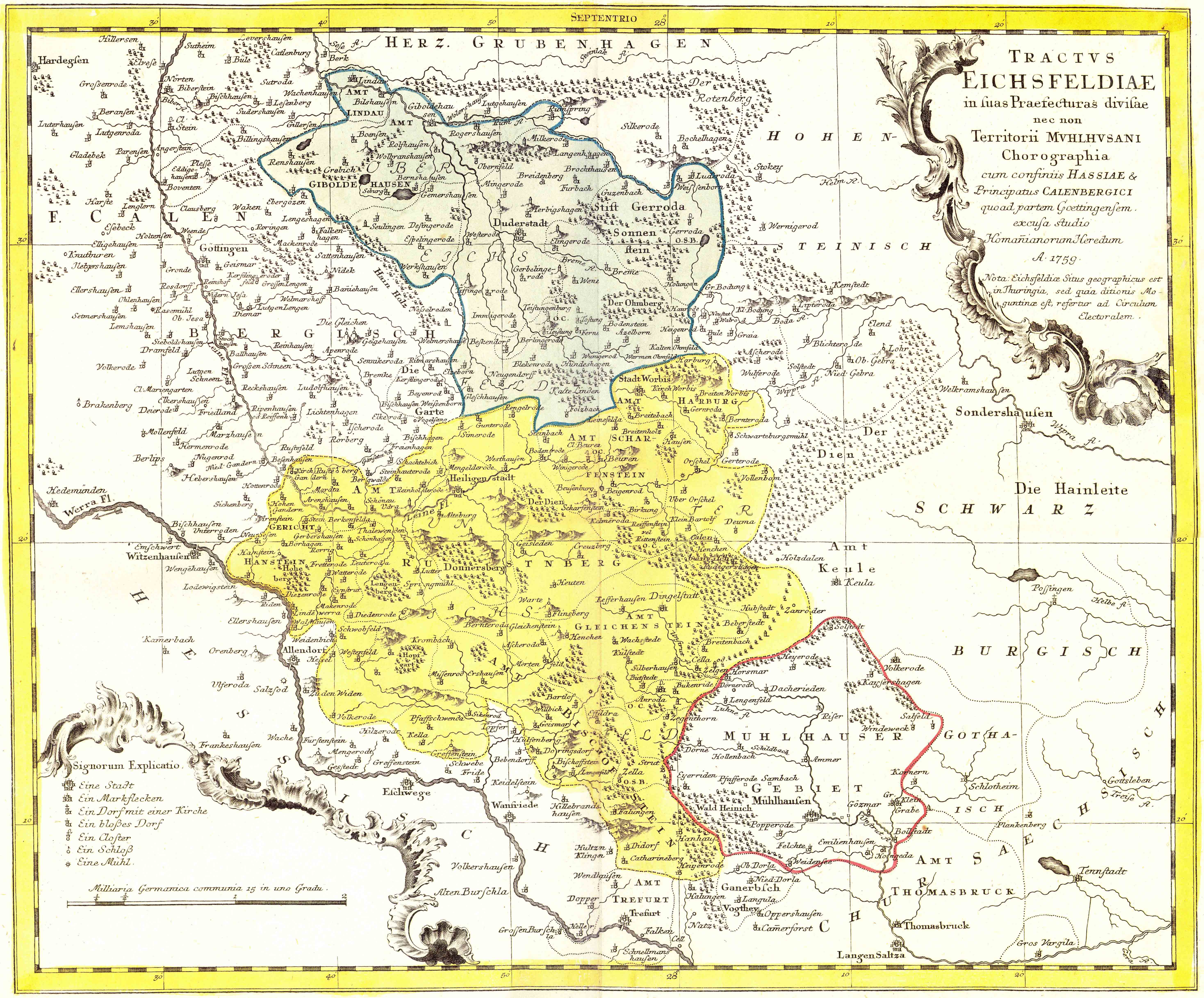
The Eichsfeld region and the territory of the Reichsstadt (imperial city) of Mühlhausen with Großgrabe and Kleingrabe around 1759 (the map contains some errors)

Großgrabe and Kleingrabe were first mentioned in a document on 17 July 997. On 4 June 1300, Landgrave Frederick I sold the village together with Bollstedt and Höngeda to the Reichsstadt (imperial city) of Mühlhausen. In 1565, there were 58 inhabitants in Wester-Grabe (Großgrabe) and 42 in Oster-Grabe (Kleingrabe).

In 1802, Großgrabe and Kleingrabe, together with Mühlhausen, fell to the Kingdom of Prussia, from 1807 to 1813 to the Kingdom of Westphalia (Dachrieden canton) created by Napoleon, and after the Congress of Vienna in 1816, they were assigned to the district of Mühlhausen i. Th. in the Prussian province of Saxony. The municipalities of Großgrabe and Kleingrabe were merged in 1965 to form the municipality of Grabe.

The village, which has always been agricultural, adopted new forms of land ownership after 1990. With equestrian sports, the connection to the city is further strengthened.

On 30 June 1994, Grabe became part of the newly created municipality of Weinbergen. Since 1 January 2019, when the municipality of Weinbergen was dissolved and its villages joined the town of Mühlhausen, it has been a quarter of that town.

== Sights ==
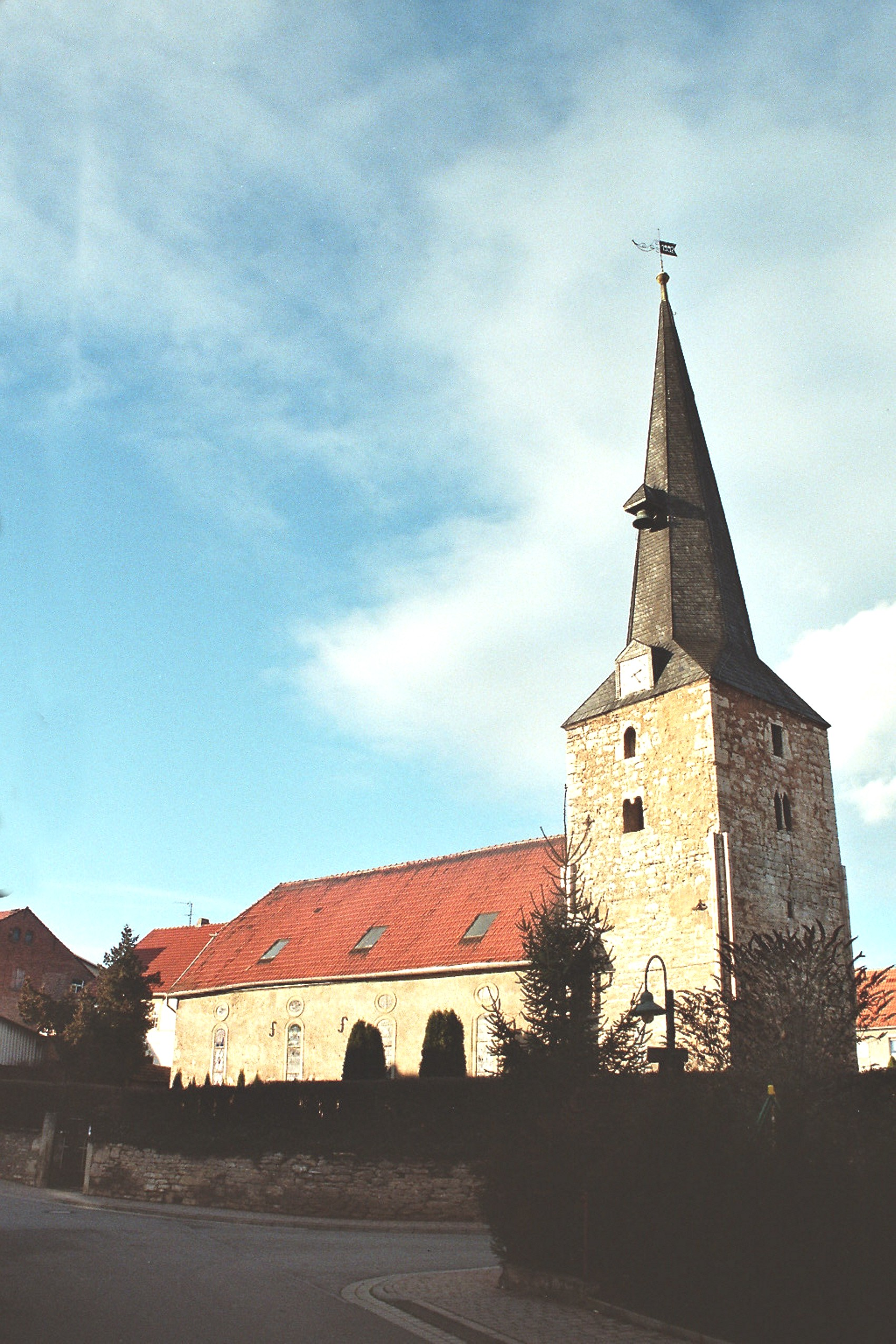
St George's Church

- St George's Church in Großgrabe
- Ruins of St Albanus's Church in Kleingrabe
- Furthmühle (Furth mill)

== Transport ==
Grabe station was on the Ebeleben–Mühlhausen railway line. Freight traffic was discontinued at the end of 1994 and passenger traffic on 31 May 1997. The line has been closed since 15 August 1998.

== Bibliography ==
- Kirchner, Christian (2011). Ortsfamilienbuch Kleingrabe 1407–1963. Bad Langensalza: Rockstuhl. ISBN 978-3-86777-264-8.
