= Nottertal-Heilinger Höhen =

- Town
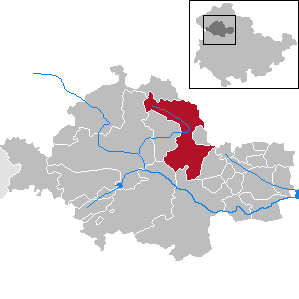
- Location of Nottertal-Heilinger Höhen within Unstrut-Hainich-Kreis district
- Interactive map of Nottertal-Heilinger Höhen
- Location within Germany Location within Thuringia
- Coordinates: 51°14′49″N 10°39′23″E
- Country: Germany
- State: Thuringia
- District: Unstrut-Hainich-Kreis

Government
  - Mayor (2023–29): Alexander Blankenburg

Area
  - Total: 75.95 km^{2} (29.32 sq mi)
- Elevation: 243 m (797 ft)

Population (2025-12-31)
  - Total: 5,750
  - Density: 75.7/km^{2} (196/sq mi)
- Time zone: UTC+01:00 (CET)
  - Summer (DST): UTC+02:00 (CEST)
- Postal codes: 99994
- Dialling codes: 036021
- Vehicle registration: UH

Nottertal-Heilinger Höhen (German pronunciation: [ˈnɔtɐˌtaːl ˈhaɪlɪŋɐ ˈhøːən], lit. 'Notter Valley-Heilingen Heights') is a town in the Unstrut-Hainich-Kreis district, in Thuringia, Germany. It was created with effect from 31 December 2019 by the merger of the former municipalities of Schlotheim, Bothenheilingen, Issersheilingen, Kleinwelsbach, Neunheilingen and Obermehler. It takes its name from the river Notter, that flows through the municipality, and the Heilingen hills.
