= Höngeda =

- Ortsteil of Mühlhausen
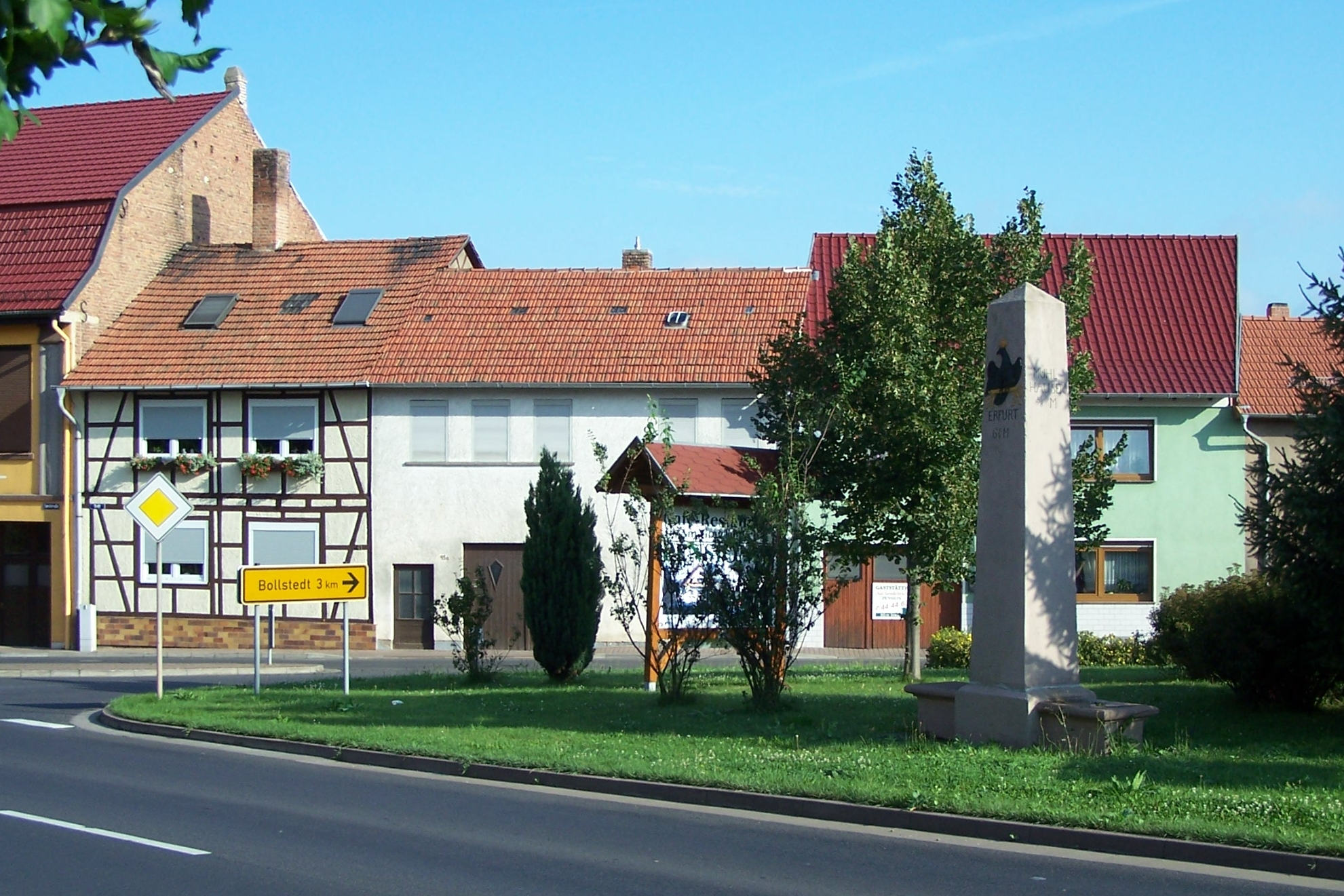
- The Prussian milestone in Höngeda
- Interactive map of Höngeda
- Location within Germany Location within Thuringia
- Coordinates: 51°10′55″N 10°30′12″E
- Country: Germany
- State: Thuringia
- District: Unstrut-Hainich-Kreis
- Town: Mühlhausen
- First mentioned: 876

Government
  - Mayor: Falk Güte
- Elevation: 198 m (650 ft)

Population (March 2021)
  - Total: 723
- Time zone: UTC+01:00 (CET)
  - Summer (DST): UTC+02:00 (CEST)
- Postal codes: 99998
- Dialling codes: 03601
- Vehicle registration: UH, LSZ, MHL
- Website: muehlhausen.de

Höngeda (pronounced [ˈhœŋəda]) is a village and a quarter of the town of Mühlhausen in Thuringia, central Germany.

== Geography ==
Höngeda is located southeast of Mühlhausen along the Landesstraße (state road) 247 from Mühlhausen to Gotha in the Thuringian Basin and in the two-kilometre-wide Unstrut lowlands. The area is a flat, undulating farmland. Poplars break up the landscape.

== History ==
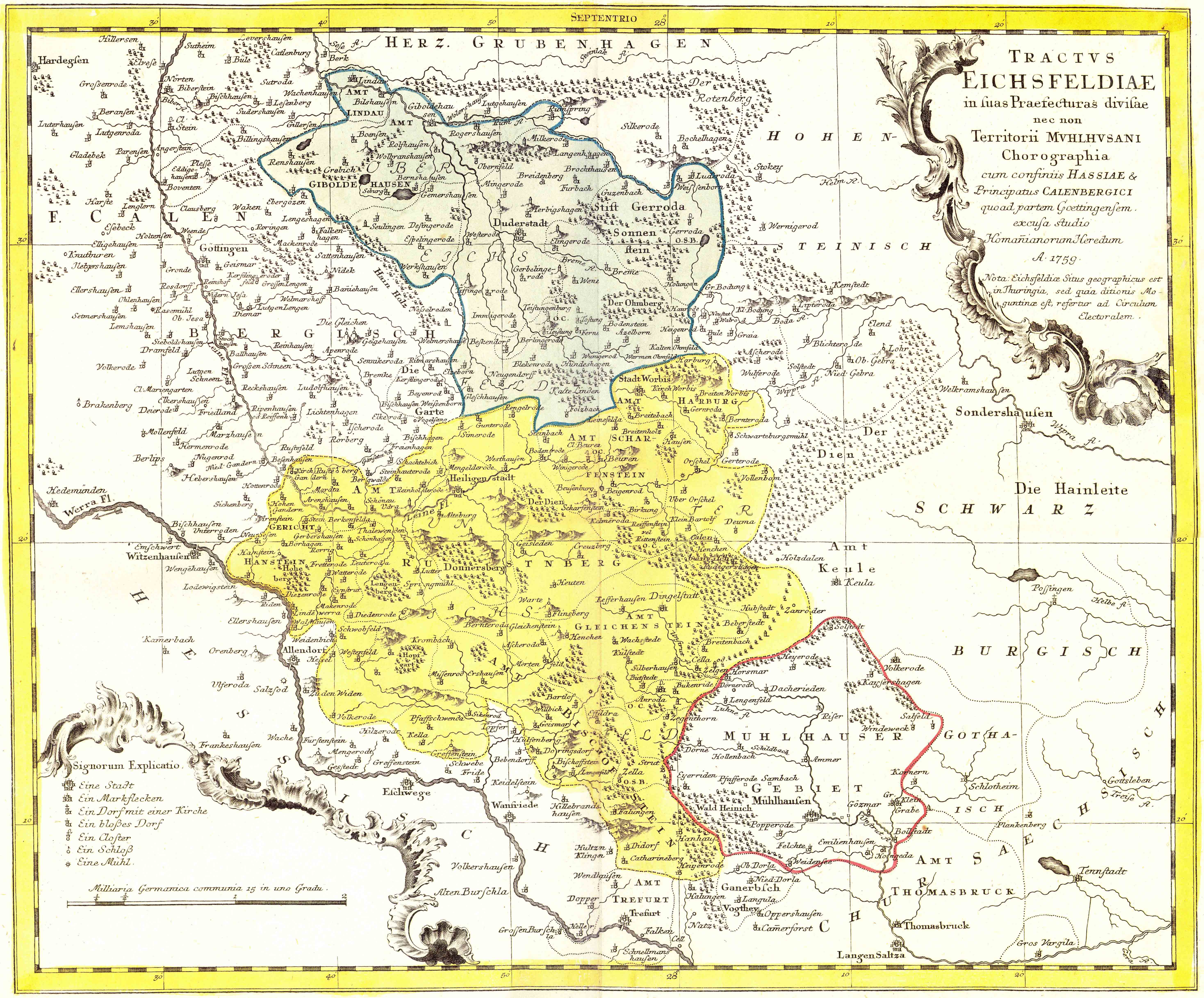
The Eichsfeld region and the territory of the Reichsstadt (imperial city) Mühlhausen with Hongeda (Höngeda) around 1759 (the map contains some errors)

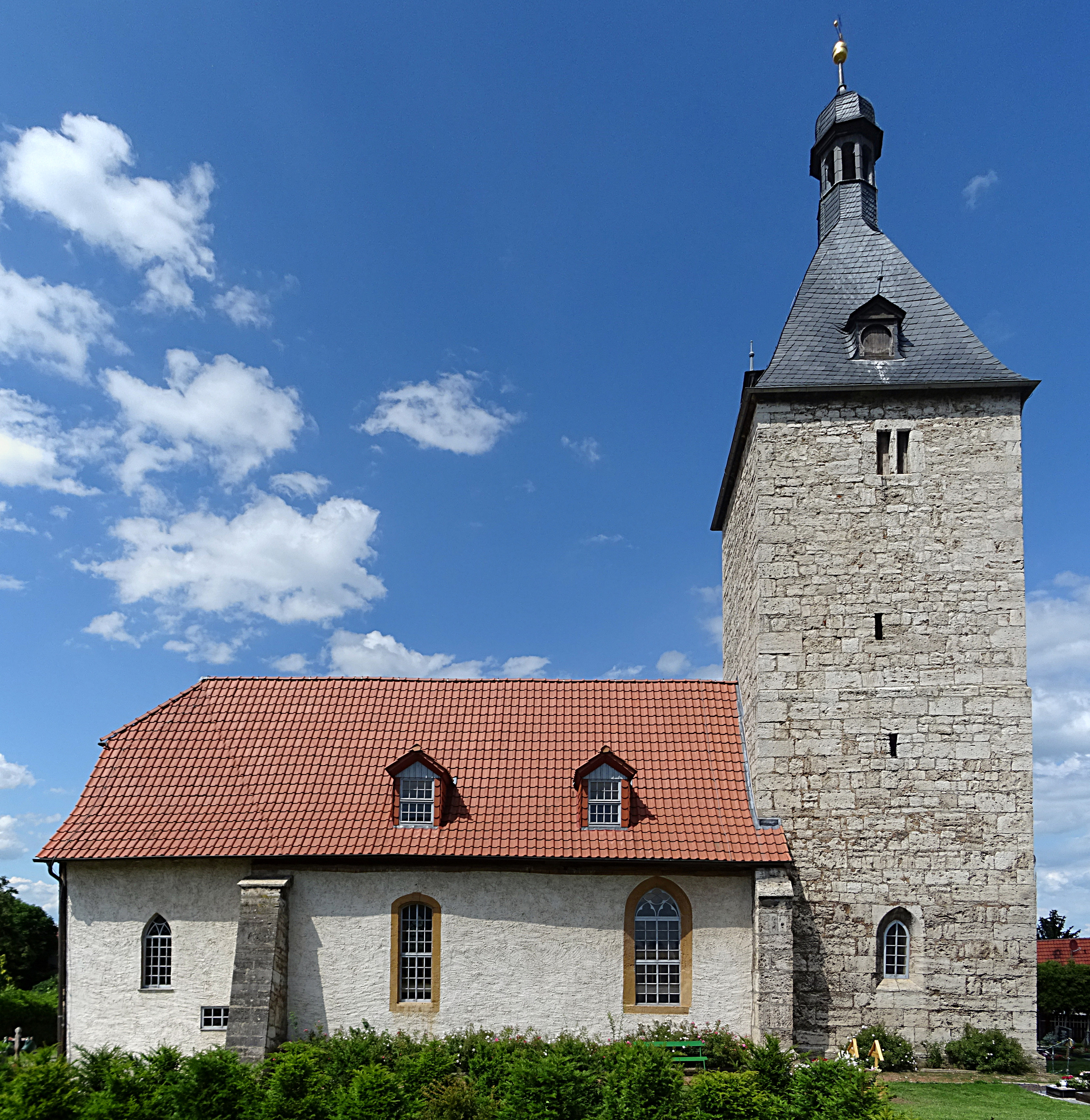
St Cyriacus's Church

Höngeda was first mentioned in a document on 18 May 876. On 4 June 1300, Landgrave Frederick I sold the village, together with Grabe and Bollstedt, to the imperial city of Mühlhausen. In 1565, there were 30 (male) inhabitants in Höngeda. In 1802, Höngeda, together with Mühlhausen, fell to the Kingdom of Prussia, from 1807 to 1813 to the Kingdom of Westphalia (Dorla canton) created by Napoleon, and after the Congress of Vienna in 1816, it was assigned to the district of Mühlhausen i. Th. in the Prussian province of Saxony.

Höngeda has always been an agriculturally oriented village, which after the fall of communism adopted new forms of land ownership. Small-scale industry has settled in the village. Animal enclosures and the gondola pond are attractions in the surrounding area.

On 30 June 1994, Höngeda was incorporated into the new municipality of Weinbergen. Since 1 January 2019, it has been a quarter of the town of Mühlhausen due to the accession of the municipality of Weinbergen to the town.

== Sights ==
- St Cyriacus's Church, Höngeda

== Notable people ==
- Karl Gottlieb Hildebrandt (1858–1925), physicist, school director, and university lecturer
- Walter Burghardt (1885–1938), politician (NSDAP)
- Klaus Listemann (born 1940 in Höngeda), Major General of the Nationale Volksarmee (National People's Army) of the German Democratic Republic
