= Bollstedt =

- Ortsteil of Mühlhausen
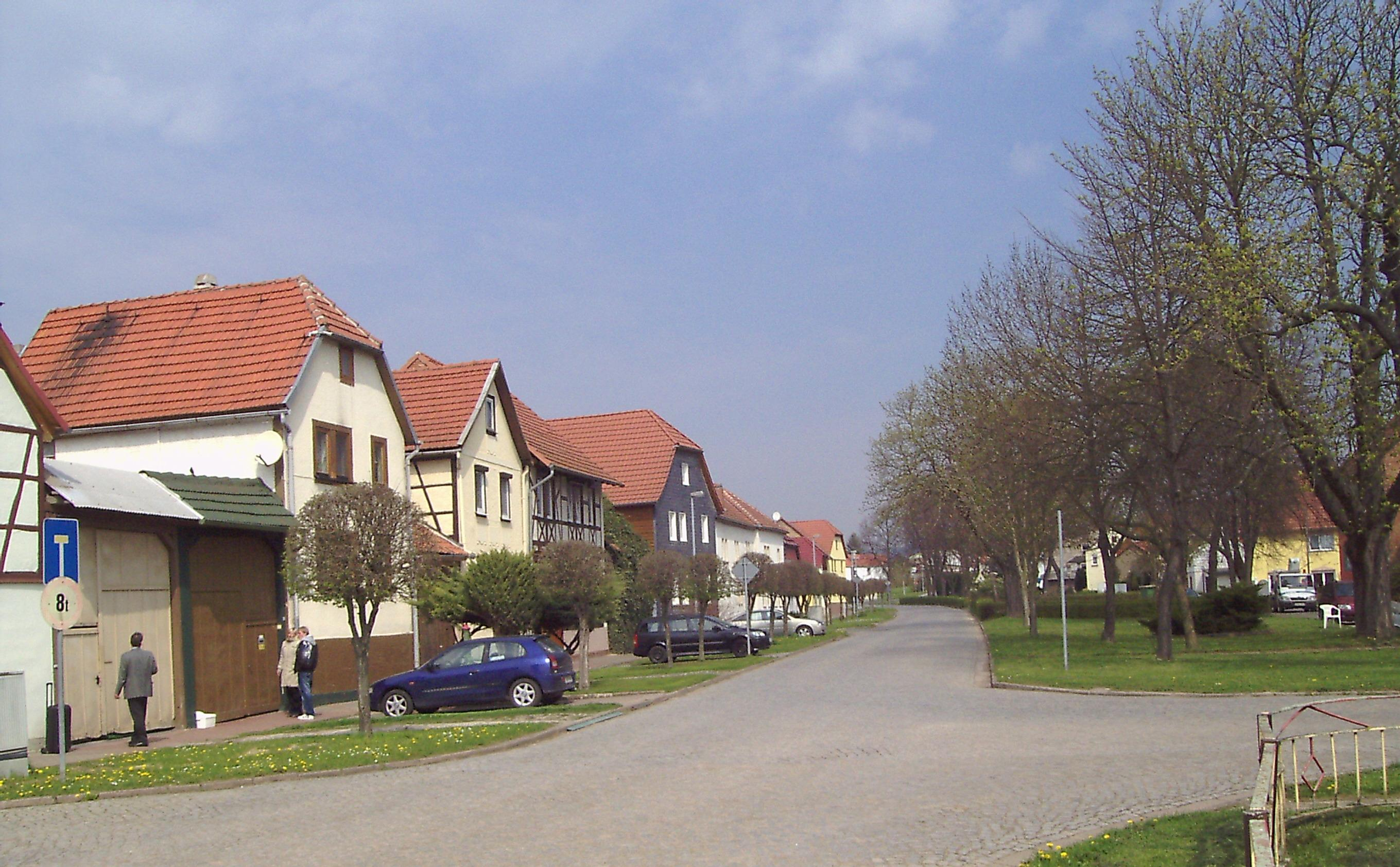
- Unter den Linden in Bollstedt

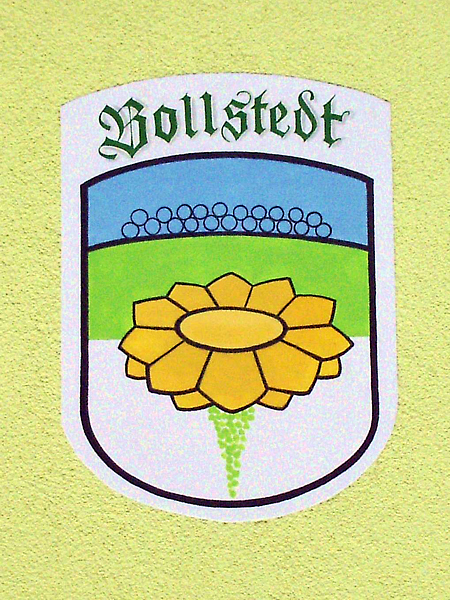
- Coat of arms
- Interactive map of Bollstedt
- Location within Germany Location within Thuringia
- Coordinates: 51°11′58″N 10°31′48″E
- Country: Germany
- State: Thuringia
- District: Unstrut-Hainich-Kreis
- Town: Mühlhausen
- First mentioned: 876

Government
  - Mayor: Thomas Ahke
- Elevation: 188 m (617 ft)

Population (March 2021)
  - Total: 1,001
- Time zone: UTC+01:00 (CET)
  - Summer (DST): UTC+02:00 (CEST)
- Postal codes: 99998
- Dialling codes: 03601
- Vehicle registration: UH, LSZ, MHL
- Website: muehlhausen.de

Bollstedt (pronounced [ˈbɔlʃtɛt]) is a village and a quarter of the town of Mühlhausen in Thuringia, central Germany, situated on the left bank of the Unstrut (river kilometre 28).

== Geography ==
=== Location ===
The village lies in an up-to-two-kilometre-wide Unstrut floodplain between Mühlhausen and Bad Langensalza and is embedded in the flat Inner Thuringian farmland. The lowest point of the village is 182 m above NN in the Unstrut valley, the highest is 249 m above NN on the Weinberg (vineyard) in the north. The village is bordered to the west by the straightened Unstrut, which is dammed on both sides, and is hardly visible because the foot of the dam is planted with a dense row of Lombardy poplars.

Forests can only be found on the Breiter Berg and the neighbouring Wachkuppe, where conifers were planted in the late 19th century.

=== Geology ===
The geology of the Unstrut floodplain is characterised by alluvial loams. The hills Weinberg in the north, Breiter Berg in the east and Roter Berg in the southeast are characterised by the clays, marls and sandstones of the Middle Keuper, which are overlain by boulder clay and loess several metres thick.

== History ==
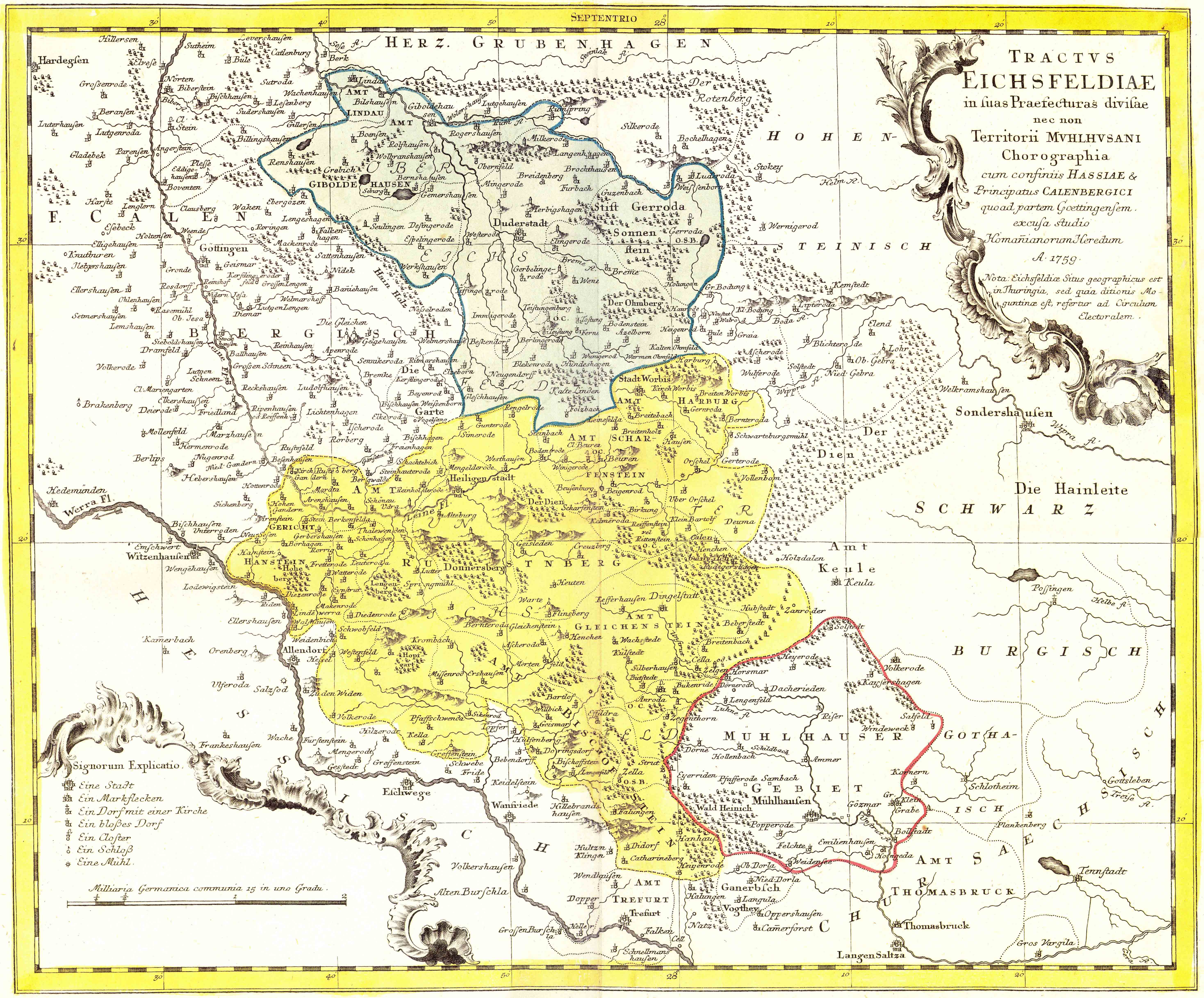
The Eichsfeld region and the territory of the Reichsstadt (imperial city) of Mühlhausen with Bollstadt (Bollstedt) around 1759 (the map contains some errors)

The village of Bollstedt was first mentioned in 876 AD. On 4 June 1300, Landgrave Frederick I sold the village together with Grabe and Höngeda to the Reichsstadt (imperial city) of Mühlhausen. In 1565, Bollstedt had a population of 88.

In 1802, Bollstedt, together with Mühlhausen, fell to the Kingdom of Prussia, from 1807 to 1813 to the Kingdom of Westphalia (Dachrieden canton) created by Napoleon, and after the Congress of Vienna in 1816, it was assigned to the district of Mühlhausen i. Th. in the Prussian province of Saxony.

On 30 June 1994, Bollstedt became part of the newly created municipality of Weinbergen. Since 1 January 2019, when the municipality of Weinbergen was dissolved and its villages joined the town of Mühlhausen, it has been a quarter of that town.

== Coat of arms ==
The coat of arms symbolises a spring pheasant's eye, as it comes into bloom in early spring on the Keuper hills to the north and east of Bollstedt. The green background stands for the grass-green Unstrut floodplain, the blue for the sky, and the circles for the bales of straw that characterise the wide arable hill landscape after the grain harvest.

== Economy ==
The majority of Bollstedt is agricultural. One of the largest employers is the local agricultural cooperative (Agrargenossenschaft Bollstedt). To the south of the village, the Keuper and loess loams mined on the Roter Berg are processed in the Wienerberger brick industry plant.

== Transport ==
The village is connected to the Bundesstraßen (federal highways) 247 and 249 via second-order country roads. There is an airfield on the Weinberg hill in the north. The route of the disused Ebeleben–Mühlhausen railway line with the former Bollstedt stop runs along the north-western edge of the village. The tracks and bridges were dismantled in 2007. Bollstedt (Gemeindeschänke) is the terminus of bus line 5 of the Mühlhausen town bus service. Bollstedt is thus connected to the public transport system of the Regionalbus-Gesellschaft Unstrut-Hainich- und Kyffhäuserkreis.

== Culture and sights ==
=== Art projects ===
The painter Siegfried Böhning from Bollstedt is a founding member of the Mühlhausen association Kunstwestthüringer (Art of Western Thuringia) and founded the art projects "ZEITBRÜCKEN" (1992), "AUSZEIT" (1993) and "ZEIT-LOS" (1994) in the village, to which other German and international artists contributed their ephemeral art objects in the landscape.

=== St Boniface's Church ===
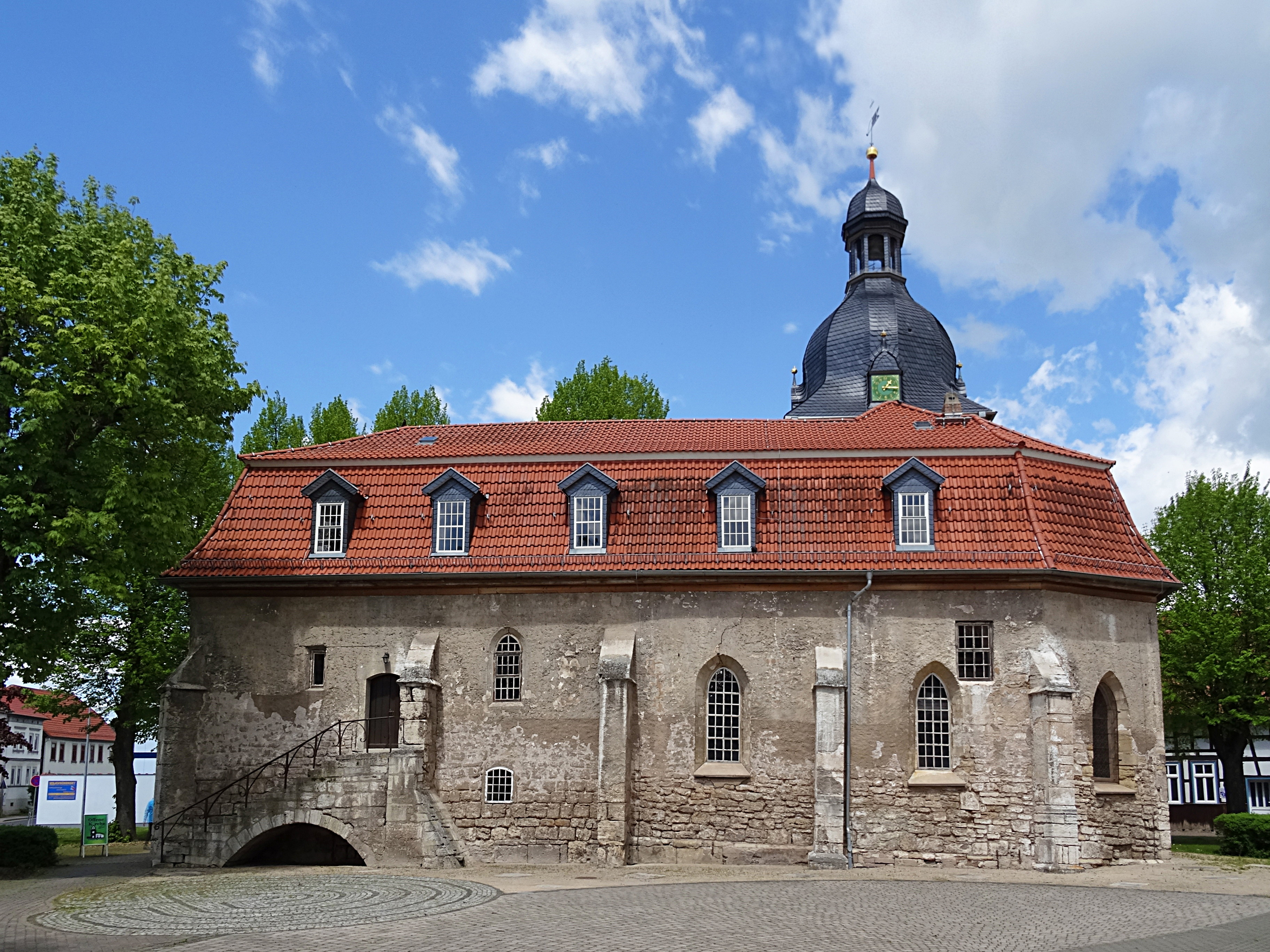
St Boniface's Church in Bollstedt

St Boniface's Church is located in the centre of the village, surrounded by the churchyard, which was once a cemetery. The medieval predecessor church, originally dedicated to St Nicholas, was destroyed and demolished during the Thirty Years' War. In the second half of the 17th century, a new building was erected in the Gothic style as an aisleless church with a mansard roof. The last renovation of the church took place in 2001 with the support of the German Foundation for Monument Protection. Today, the Bollstedt parish belongs to the Mühlhausen church district of the Protestant Church in Central Germany.

=== View of Bollstedt ===
Numerous farms are grouped around the village green in the east – a wide, long street – and the church green in the west. The residential houses are mostly plastered half-timbered buildings. To the south, there is a street with smallholders' houses – the so-called New Village. The village was enlarged by new buildings, mostly single-family houses, in the north and northeast. The municipal administration and a sports field were also built there. The new cemetery is located in the extreme north-east of the village.

=== Field monuments ===
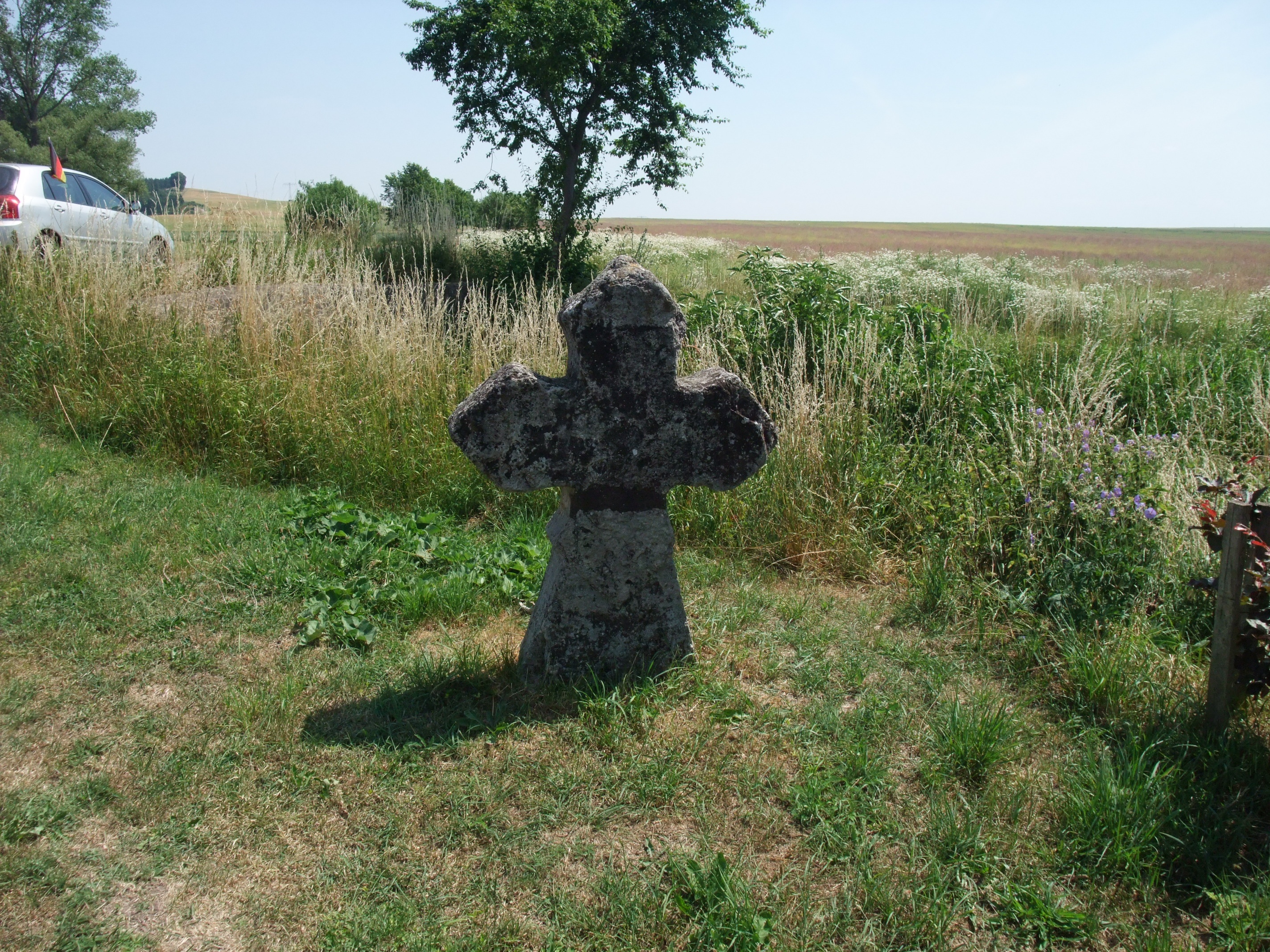
The stone cross near Bollstedt

On the eastern edge of the village, next to a bridge on the old road to Bothenheilingen, there is a historical signpost, the "Vogteier Hut", and on the adjacent ditch there is a late-medieval stone cross. In addition, there are four Verbotssteine (prohibition stones) from the years 1861–1863 on the Unstrut dam and its tributary.

== Notable people ==
- Volker Böhning (born 4 July 1948 in Bollstedt), agronomist, hunter and administrative officer
- Eike Kopf (born 1940 in Bollstedt), philosopher

== Bibliography ==
- Kopf, Eike (2012). Erinnerungen an Bollstedt bei Mühlhausen in Thüringen 1940–1959 [Memories of Bollstedt near Mühlhausen in Thuringia 1940–1959] (in German). Bad Langensalza: Rockstuhl. ISBN 978-3-86777-455-0.
