= Neunheilingen =

- Ortsteil of Nottertal-Heilinger Höhen
- Interactive map of Neunheilingen
- Location within Germany Location within Thuringia
- Coordinates: 51°12′N 10°40′E
- Country: Germany
- State: Thuringia
- District: Unstrut-Hainich-Kreis
- Town: Nottertal-Heilinger Höhen

Area
  - Total: 14.75 km^{2} (5.70 sq mi)
- Elevation: 251 m (823 ft)

Population (2018-12-31)
  - Total: 459
  - Density: 31.1/km^{2} (80.6/sq mi)
- Time zone: UTC+01:00 (CET)
  - Summer (DST): UTC+02:00 (CEST)
- Postal codes: 99947
- Dialling codes: 036043

Neunheilingen (German pronunciation: [nɔʏnˈhaɪlɪŋən]) is a village and a former municipality in the Unstrut-Hainich-Kreis district of Thuringia, Germany. Since December 2019, it is part of the town Nottertal-Heilinger Höhen. A hoard of early Bronze Age weapons was found in the vicinity of Neunheilingen in the nineteenth century and is now kept at the British Museum in London.
