= Kleinwelsbach =

- Ortsteil of Nottertal-Heilinger Höhen
- Interactive map of Kleinwelsbach
- Location within Germany Location within Thuringia
- Coordinates: 51°10′N 10°40′E
- Country: Germany
- State: Thuringia
- District: Unstrut-Hainich-Kreis
- Town: Nottertal-Heilinger Höhen

Area
  - Total: 3.46 km^{2} (1.34 sq mi)
- Elevation: 200 m (660 ft)

Population (2018-12-31)
  - Total: 126
  - Density: 36.4/km^{2} (94.3/sq mi)
- Time zone: UTC+01:00 (CET)
  - Summer (DST): UTC+02:00 (CEST)
- Postal codes: 99947
- Dialling codes: 036043
- Website: nottertal-heilingerhoehen.de

Kleinwelsbach (German pronunciation: [klaɪnˈvɛlsbax], lit. 'Little Welsbach', in contrast to "Big Welsbach") is a village and a former municipality in the Unstrut-Hainich-Kreis district of Thuringia, Germany. Since December 2019, it is part of the town Nottertal-Heilinger Höhen.
