= Obermehler =

- Ortsteil of Nottertal-Heilinger Höhen
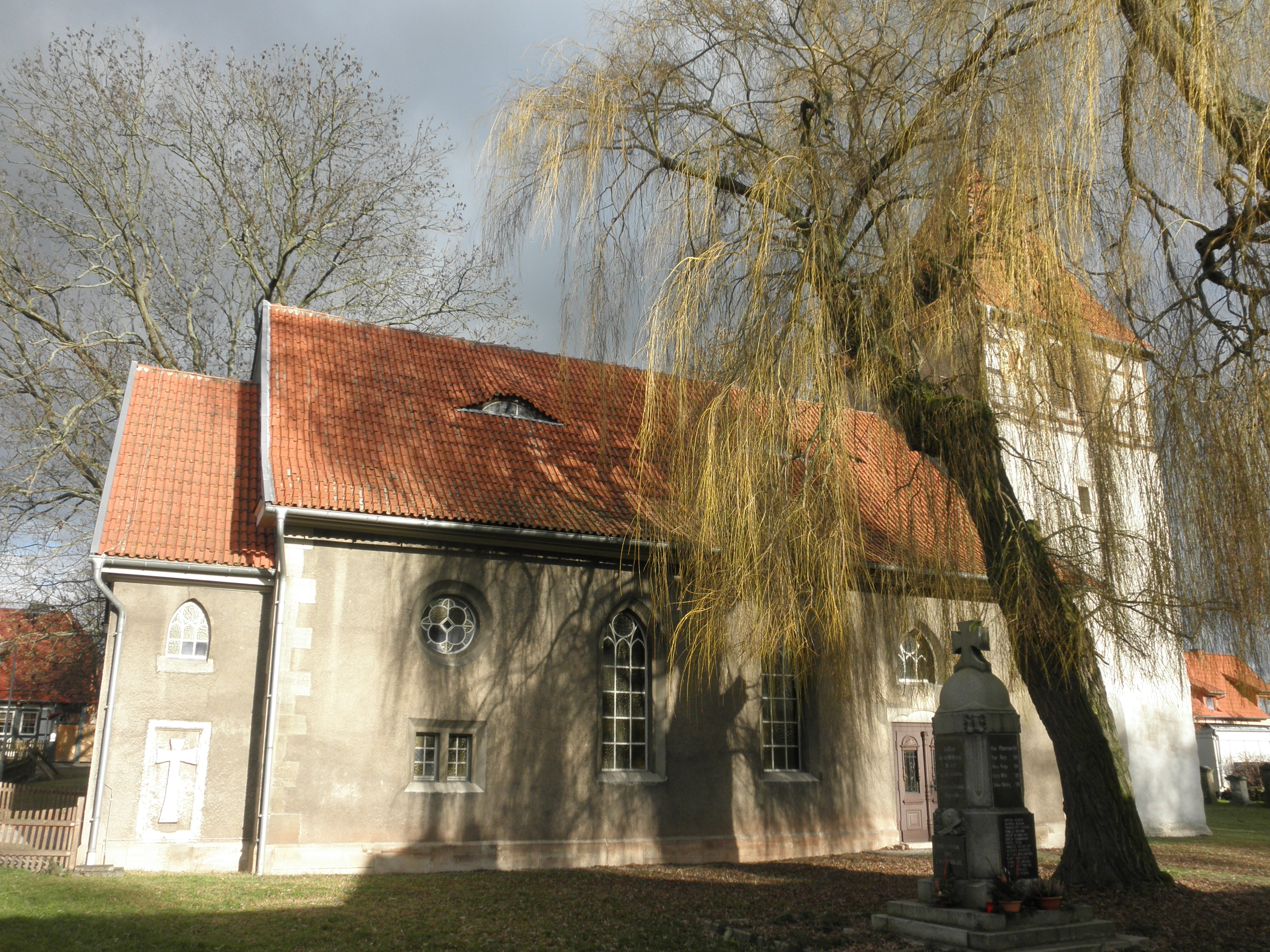
- Church of Saint Ulrich

- Coat of arms
- Interactive map of Obermehler
- Location within Germany Location within Thuringia
- Coordinates: 51°16′N 10°35′E
- Country: Germany
- State: Thuringia
- District: Unstrut-Hainich-Kreis
- Town: Nottertal-Heilinger Höhen

Area
  - Total: 21.66 km^{2} (8.36 sq mi)
- Elevation: 268 m (879 ft)

Population (2018-12-31)
  - Total: 1,245
  - Density: 57.48/km^{2} (148.9/sq mi)
- Time zone: UTC+01:00 (CET)
  - Summer (DST): UTC+02:00 (CEST)
- Postal codes: 99996
- Dialling codes: 036021

Obermehler (German pronunciation: [ˈoːbɐmeːlɐ]) is a village and a former municipality in the Unstrut-Hainich-Kreis district of Thuringia, Germany. Since December 2019, it is part of the town Nottertal-Heilinger Höhen.

== History ==
Within the German Empire (1871-1918), Obermehler was part of the Duchy of Saxe-Coburg and Gotha.
