= Notter (Unstrut) =

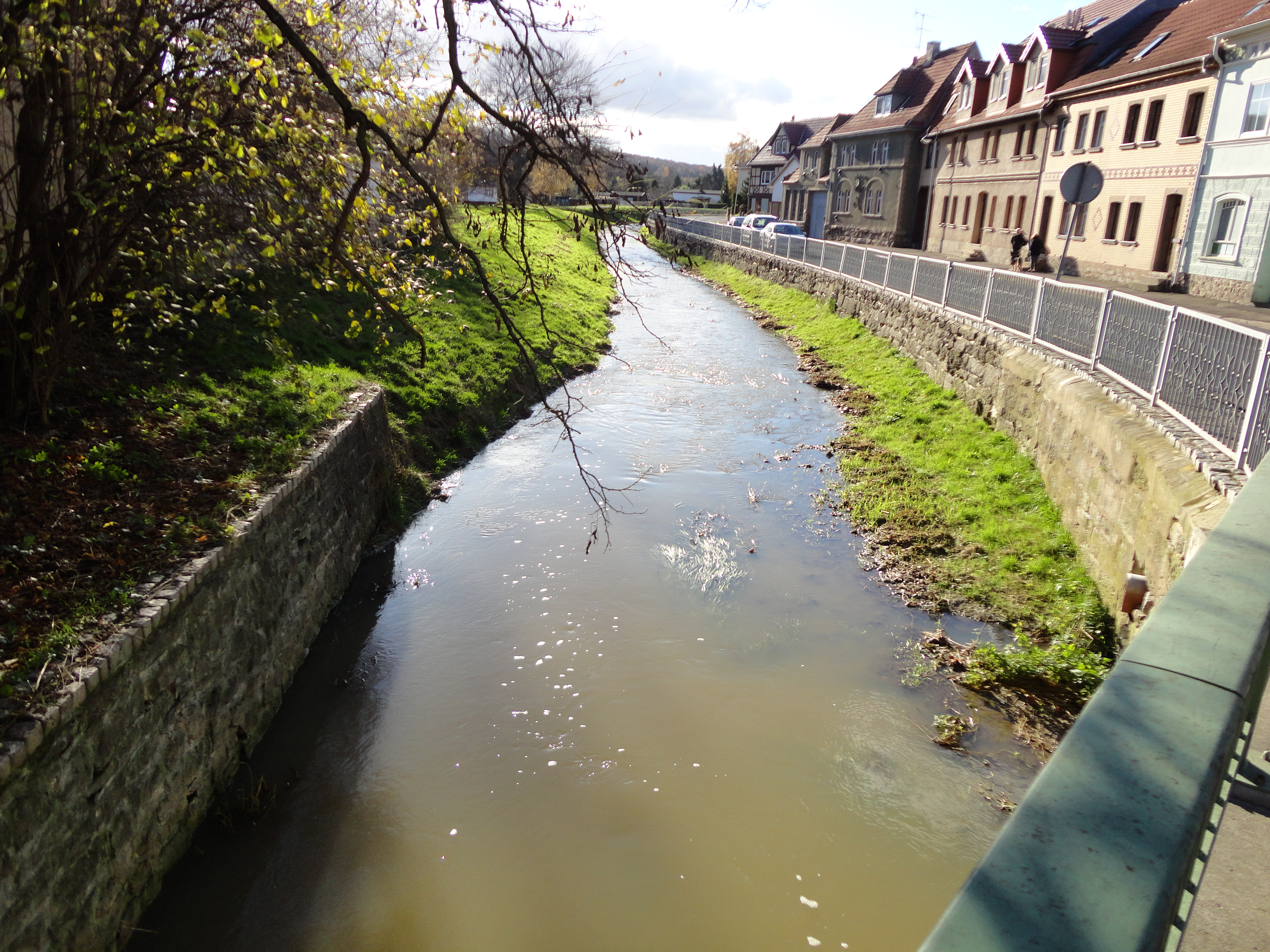
- The Notter in Schlotheim

Location
- Country: Germany
- State: Thuringia

Physical characteristics
- Source: Forest area, near Pöthen
  - coordinates: 51°17′33.26″N 10°34′3.53″E
  - elevation: 380 m (1,250 ft)
- Mouth: Unstrut, near Bollstedt
  - coordinates: 51.2013°N 10.5219°E
  - elevation: 187.3 m (615 ft)
- Length: 21.9 km (13.6 mi)
- Basin size: 121.6 km^{2} (47.0 mi^{2})

Basin features
- Progression: Unstrut→ Saale→ Elbe→ North Sea
- River system: Elbe

The Notter (German pronunciation: [ˈnɔtɐ]) is a stream in Thuringia, Germany. It flows into the Unstrut west of Bollstedt.

== See also ==
- List of rivers of Thuringia
