= Körner, Germany =

Körner
- Municipality
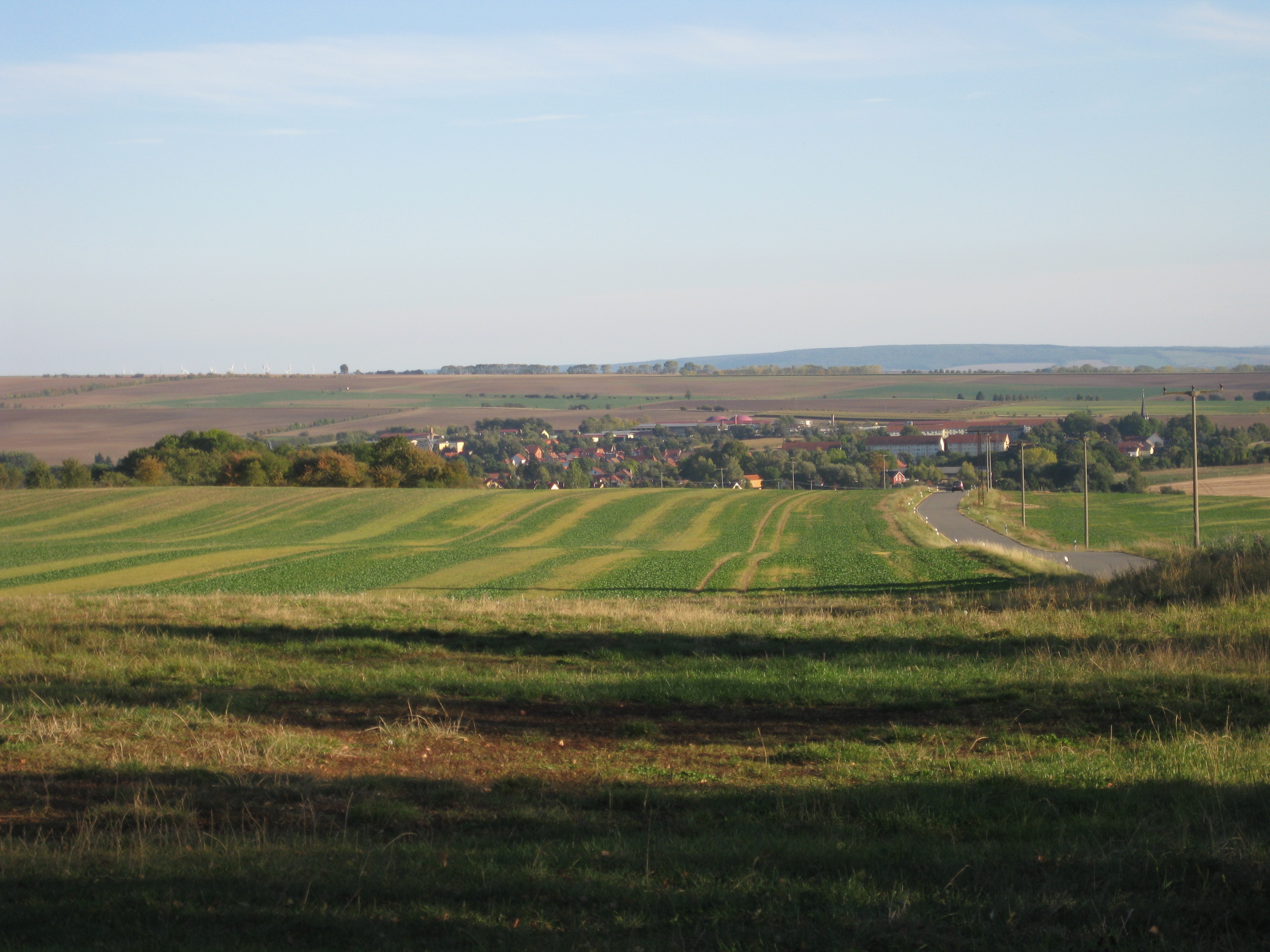
- Körner seen from the north

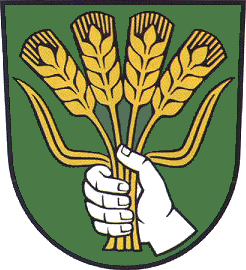
- Coat of arms

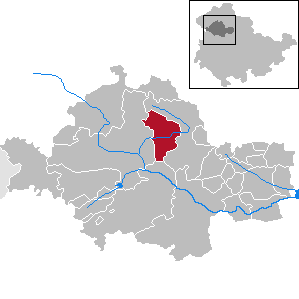
- Location of Körner within Unstrut-Hainich-Kreis district
- Interactive map of Körner
- Location within Germany Location within Thuringia
- Coordinates: 51°13′52″N 10°35′15″E
- Country: Germany
- State: Thuringia
- District: Unstrut-Hainich-Kreis

Government
  - Mayor (2024–2030): Matthias Niebuhr (Ind.)

Area
  - Total: 30.83 km^{2} (11.90 sq mi)
- Elevation: 208 m (682 ft)

Population (2025-12-31)
  - Total: 1,604
  - Density: 52.03/km^{2} (134.7/sq mi)
- Time zone: UTC+01:00 (CET)
  - Summer (DST): UTC+02:00 (CEST)
- Postal codes: 99998
- Dialling codes: 036025
- Vehicle registration: UH
- Website: www.koerner-volkenroda.de

Körner (German pronunciation: [ˈkœʁnɐ]) is a municipality in the Unstrut-Hainich-Kreis district of Thuringia, Germany.

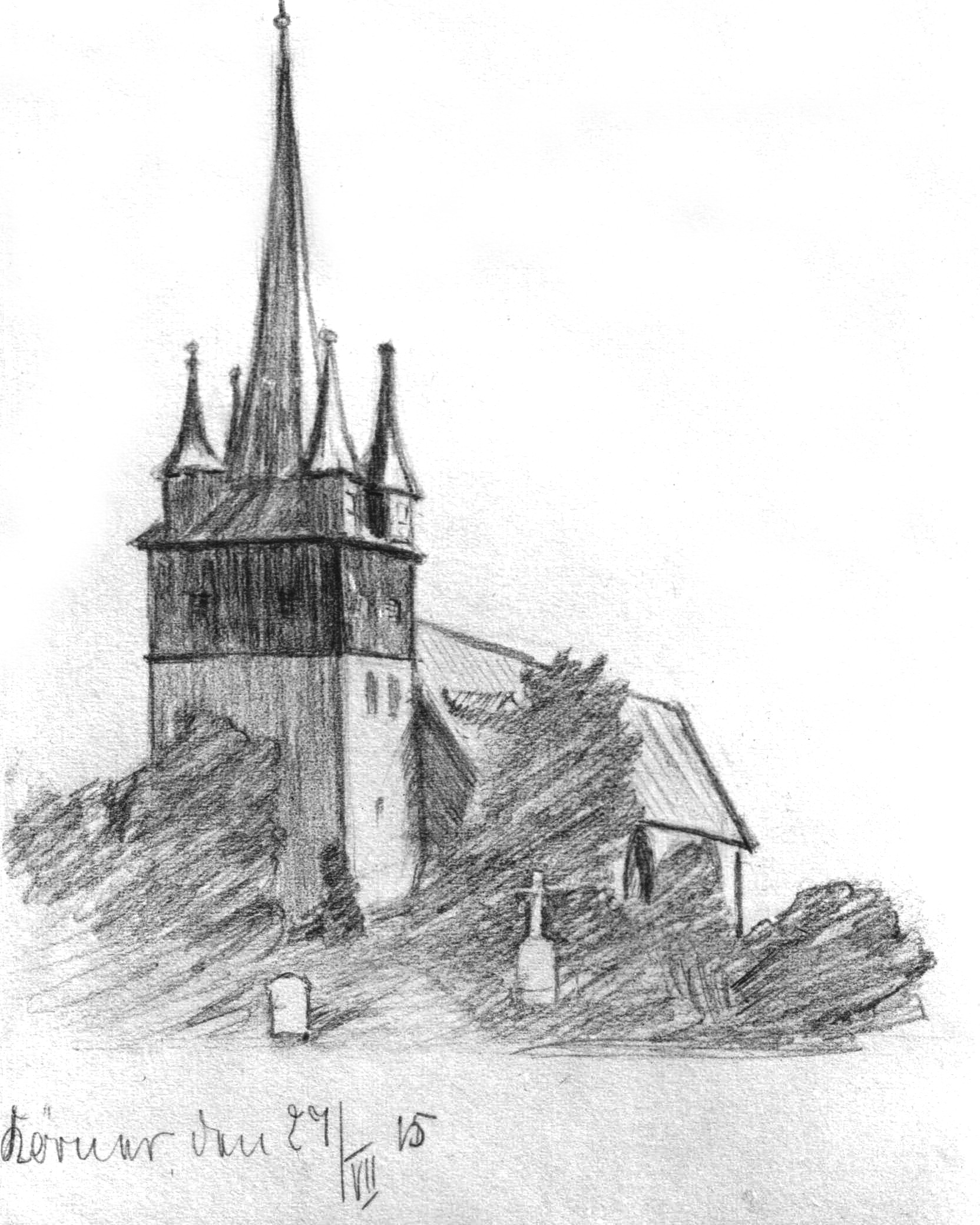
Church St. Wigberti at Körner (1915)

== History ==
Within the German Empire (1871–1945), Körner was part of the Duchy of Saxe-Coburg and Gotha.
