= Schlotheim =

Ortsteil of Nottertal-Heilinger Höhen in Thuringia, Germany

- Ortsteil of Nottertal-Heilinger Höhen
- Coat of arms
- Interactive map of Schlotheim
- Location within Germany Location within Thuringia
- Coordinates: 51°14′49″N 10°39′23″E
- Country: Germany
- State: Thuringia
- District: Unstrut-Hainich-Kreis
- Town: Nottertal-Heilinger Höhen

Area
  - Total: 22.4 km^{2} (8.6 sq mi)
- Elevation: 243 m (797 ft)

Population (2018-12-31)
  - Total: 3,559
  - Density: 159/km^{2} (412/sq mi)
- Time zone: UTC+01:00 (CET)
  - Summer (DST): UTC+02:00 (CEST)
- Postal codes: 99994
- Dialling codes: 036021
- Vehicle registration: UH

Schlotheim (German pronunciation: [ˈʃloːthaɪm]) is a town and a former municipality in the Unstrut-Hainich-Kreis district, in Thuringia, Germany. It is situated 14 kilometres (8.7 mi) east of Mühlhausen. Since December 2019, it is part of the town Nottertal-Heilinger Höhen.

== Notable residents ==
- Werner Braune (1909–1951), German Nazi SS officer, executed for war crimes
- Carlos Hartling (1869–1920) German musician author of the music of the National Anthem of Honduras.
