= St. Joseph's Church, Mühlhausen =

St Joseph's Church
- St.-Josefs-Kirche
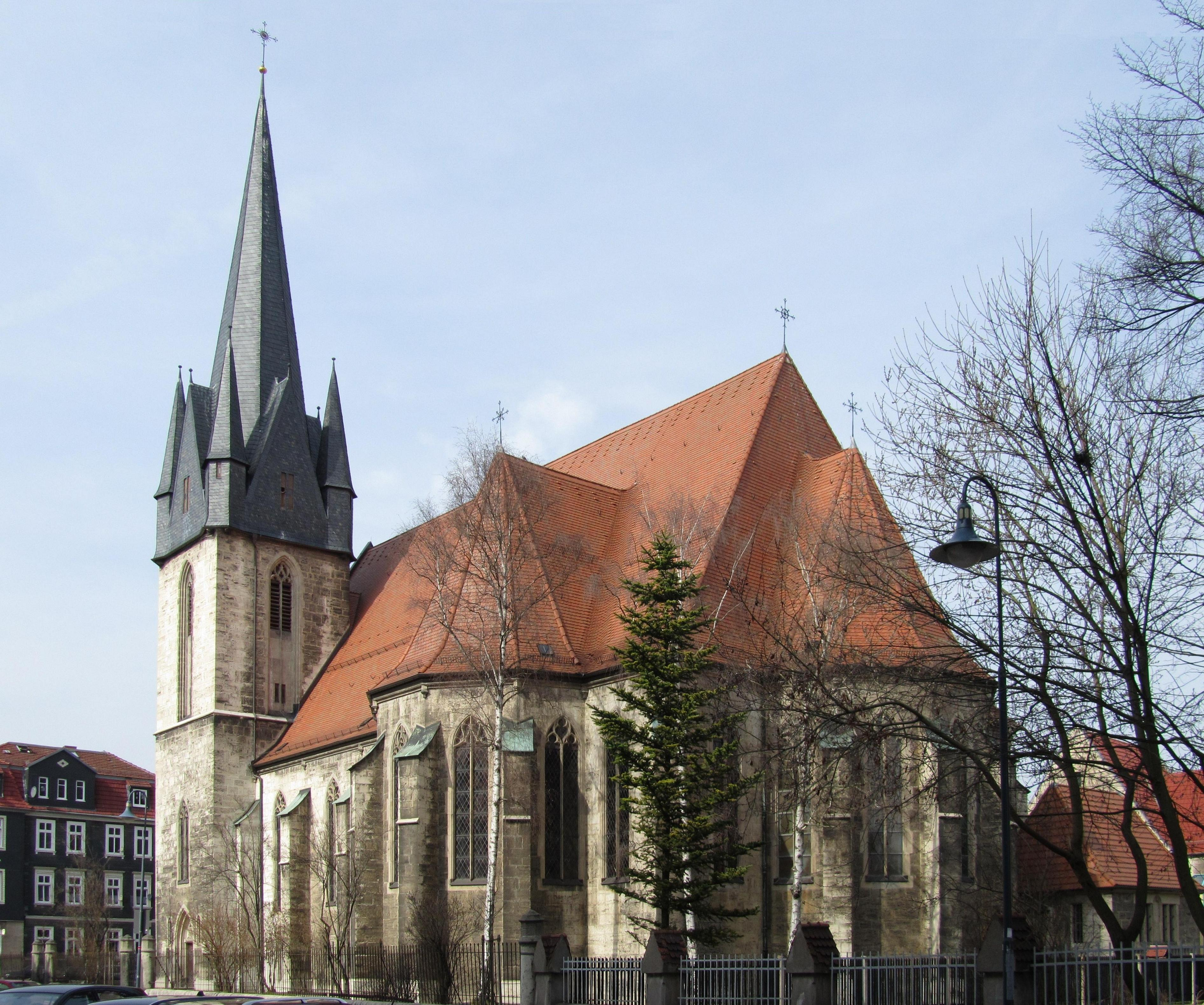

- Location in Germany
- 51.2095°N 10.4686°E
- Location: Mühlhausen, Thuringia
- Country: Germany
- Language: German
- Denomination: Roman Catholic

History
- Status: Parish church
- Dedication: Saint Joseph
- Consecrated: 15 August 1907

Architecture
- Architect: Arnold Güldenpfennig
- Style: Gothic Revival
- Years built: 1903–1905
- Groundbreaking: 14 July 1903

Specifications
- Materials: Travertine

St Joseph's Church (German: St.-Josefs-Kirche) in the town of Mühlhausen in Thuringia, Germany, is a Roman Catholic church building. The cruciform three-nave hall church was built from 1903 to 1905 according to plans by the Paderborn diocesan architect Arnold Güldenpfennig.

== History and architecture ==
A church building association took the initiative to build St Joseph's Church in 1884. The foundation stone was laid on 14 July 1903. The church was consecrated on 15 August 1907, two years after completion, by Bishop Wilhelm Schneider.

St. Joseph's is a Gothic Revival hall church with a polygonal choir and likewise polygonal transept arms. The tower is 52 metres (171 ft) high.

== Interior ==
The internal decoration took decades to complete. The statues of the saints were created at the beginning of the 20th century in the workshops of the Wiedenbrück School. In 1907, the painter Eduard Goldkuhle created the Stations of the Cross. In 1934, the walls were painted with saints.

In 1962, the interior of the church was redesigned and the wall paintings and some of the saints' statues were removed. The Gothic-Revival church windows were replaced by rhombus glazing and the side altars and the high pulpit were removed. In 1981, the parish church received a new organ.

In 2001, St Joseph's Church was given its present interior design: the altar was moved forward into the crossing, and the walls and vaults were repainted. Five choir windows designed by the artist Maren Magdalena Sorger from Magdeburg were realised by the Paderborn glass workshop Peters Floatglasmalerei.

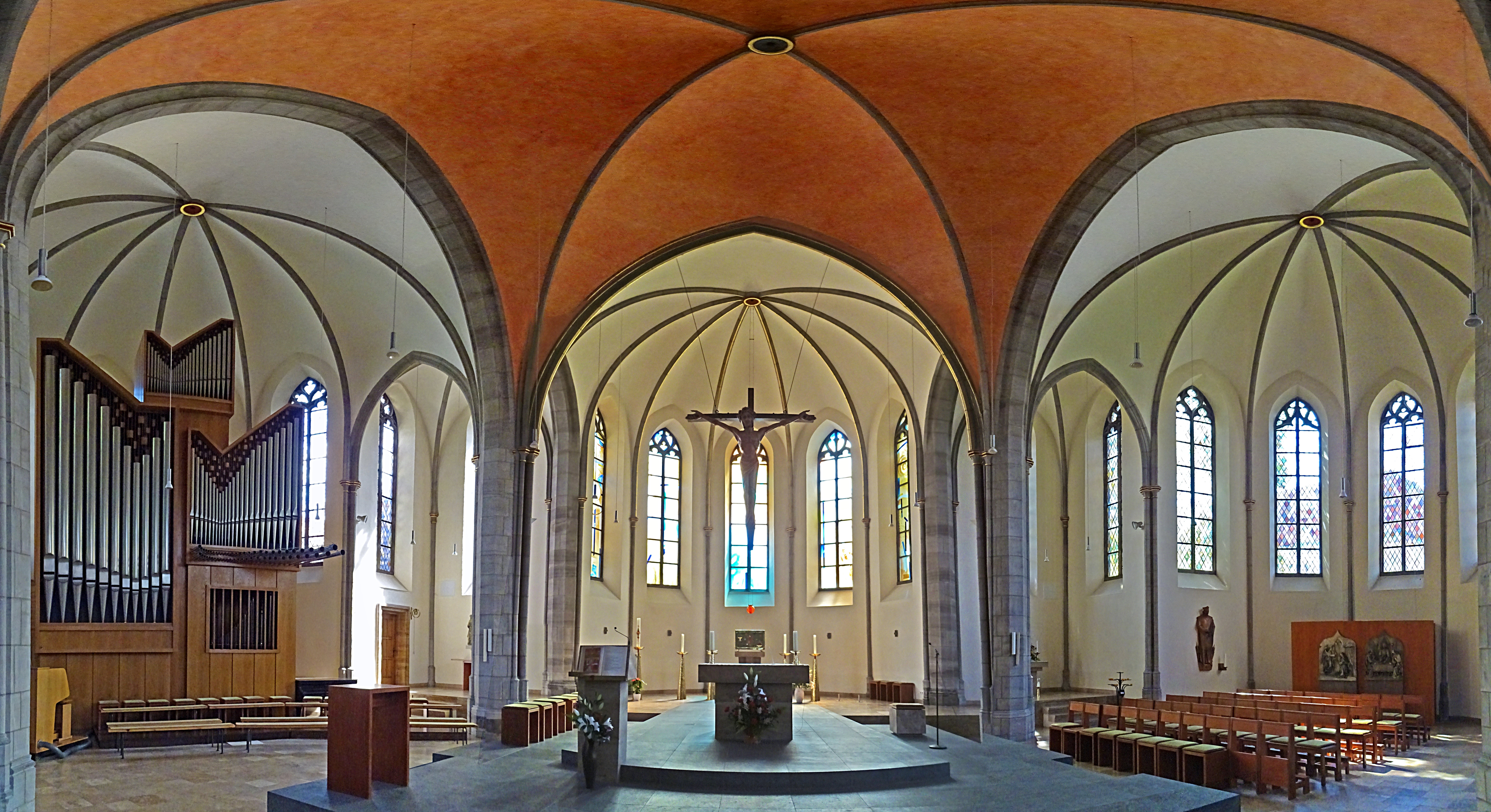
View into the transept

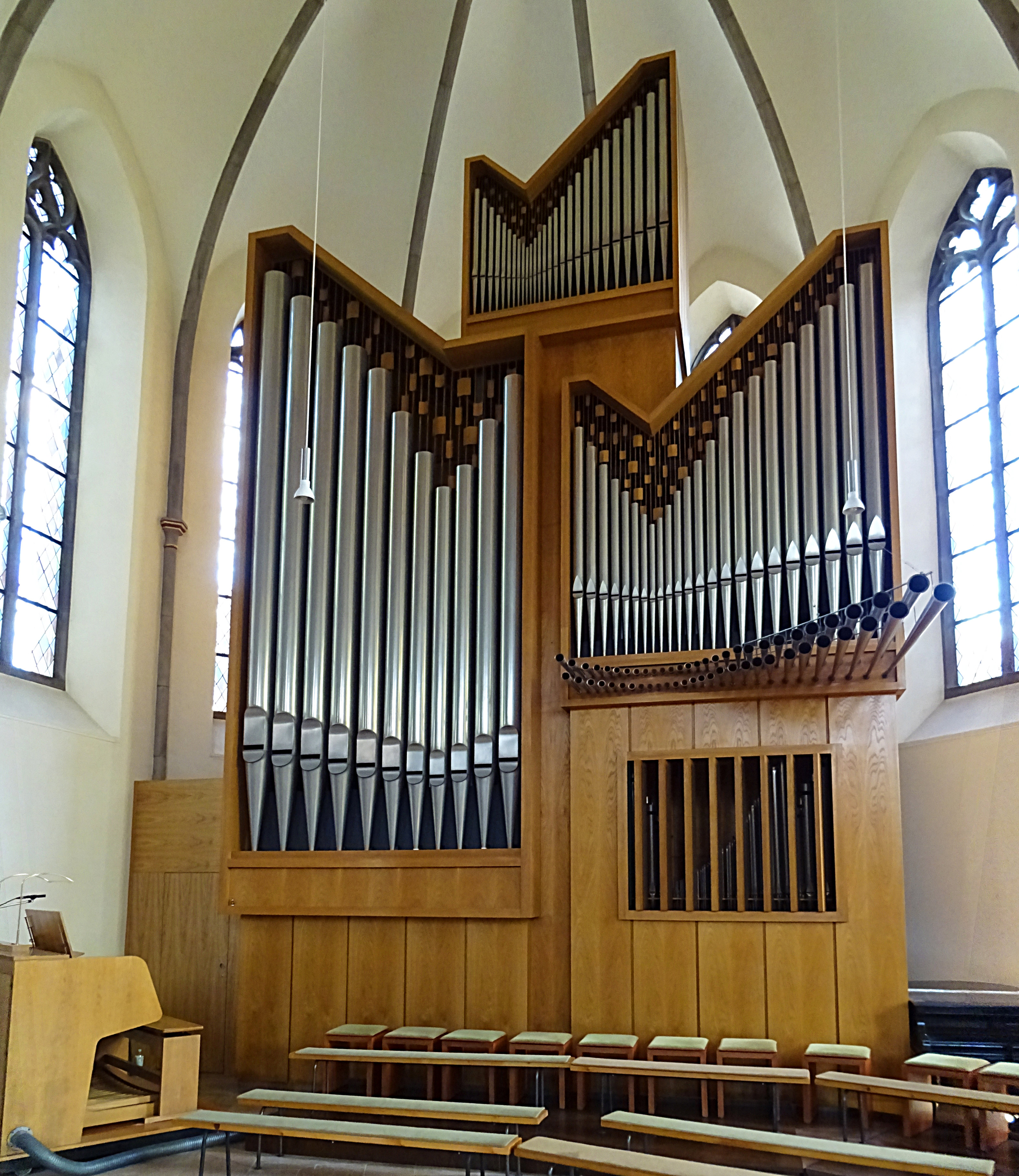
The Jehmlich organ

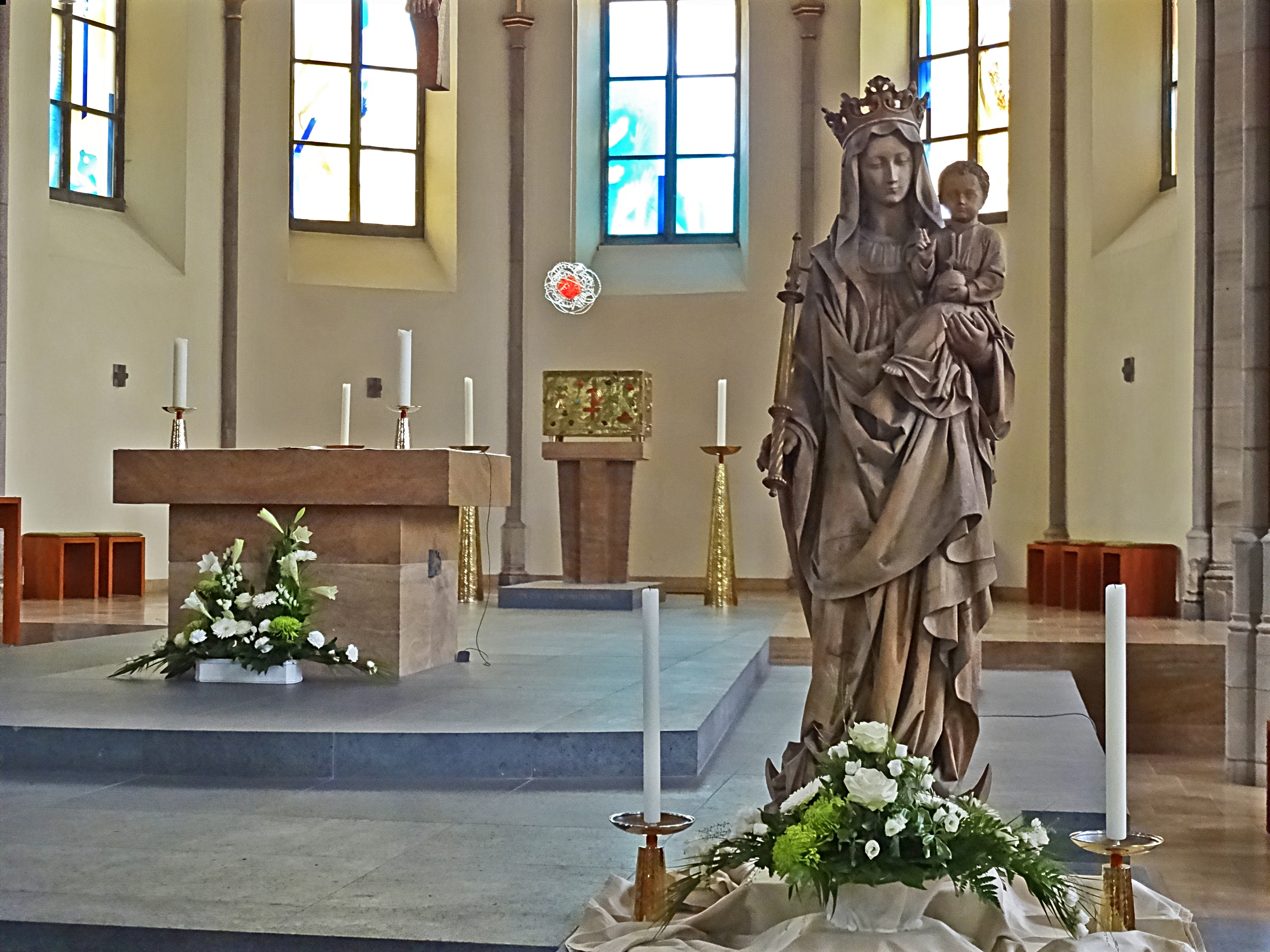
Interior view

== Bells ==
In 1928, the first four bells were hung in the tower of St Joseph's Church. After the loss of the bells in the Second World War, the parish struggled to find a new set of bells. On 15 June 1967, the Schilling company from Apolda handed over the new bronze bells, tuned to d – f – g – b flat. The new instruments with the inscriptions "Christ our Lord" (2,050 kilograms (4,520 lb)), "Mary our Advocate" (1,150 kilograms (2,540 lb)), "Joseph our Patron" (800 kilograms (1,800 lb)) and "Boniface our Messenger of Faith" (450 kilograms (990 lb)) fit harmoniously into the overall ringing of the Mühlhausen town churches.
