= Wildlife of Yemen =

The wildlife of Yemen is substantial and varied. Yemen is a large country in the southern half of the Arabian Peninsula with several geographic regions, each with a diversity of plants and animals adapted to their own particular habitats. As well as high mountains and deserts, there is a coastal plain and long coastline. The country has links with Europe and Asia, and the continent of Africa is close at hand. The flora and fauna have influences from all these regions and the country also serves as a staging post for migratory birds.

== Geography ==
Yemen is in the southern half of the Arabian Peninsula, bordering the Red Sea, the Gulf of Aden and the Arabian Sea. The country is divided into four geographical regions: the Tihamah or coastal plains to the west, the western highlands, the central highlands, and the Rub' al Khali, or "Empty Quarter", in the east, the largest sand desert in the world. The Tihamah forms an arid flat plain alongside the Red Sea coast. There are many lagoons here and considerable biodiversity; streams from the western highlands sink and evaporate before reaching the coast.

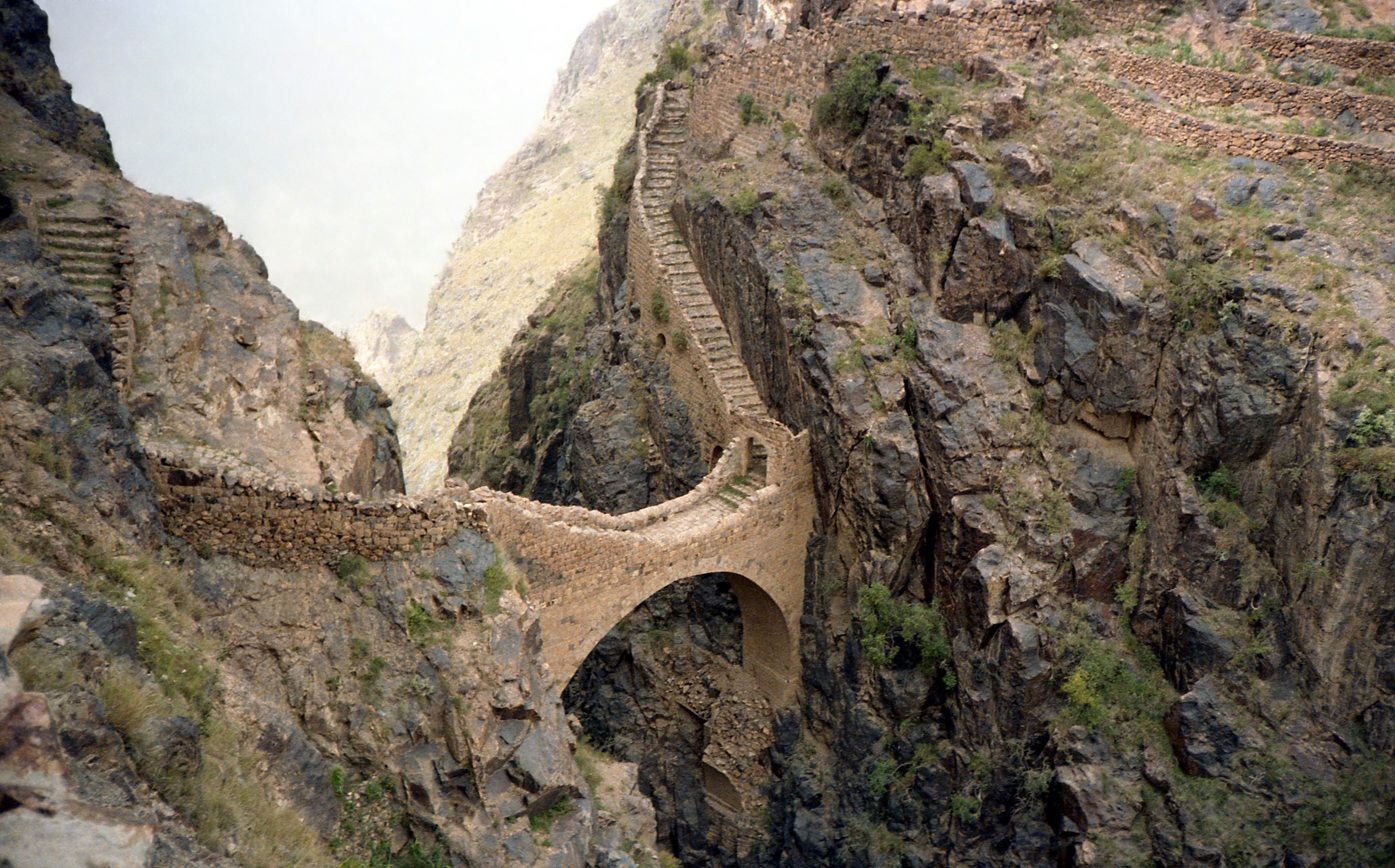
Bridge at Shaharah in the western highlands, with terracing at top right

The Sarawat Mountains (or Sarat Mountains) in Saudi Arabia extend southwards into Yemen, where they divide into two ranges. The western highlands run parallel with the Red Sea coast and to the east of them, the land slopes gently towards the Persian Gulf. These mountains receive up to 1,000 mm (40 in) of rain in places and are the wettest part of the country. Rainfall comes from southwestern monsoons and from thunderstorms in summer. For over two thousand years the steep slopes of these mountains have been terraced and intensively cropped, and little of the indigenous vegetation remains.

The central highlands rise up to over 3,300 m (10,830 ft) and contain the highest peaks of the Arabian Peninsula. They are in the rain shadow of the western highlands but receive enough rainfall for the cultivation of irrigated wheat and barley. The Rub' al Khali desert region receives almost no rainfall. Both this range and the western highlands feature many wadis, dry watercourses which have been carved out by floods when the occasional torrential downpour occurs. These often support more vascular plants than other arid areas.

== Flora ==
At high altitudes, the native flora of the western highlands is dominated by African juniper. This juniper woodland is similar to woodland in East Africa. Vachellia origena is a common leguminous tree growing in patches of woodland, in hedgerows and as individual trees on cultivated terraces in the western highlands. Shrubs such as Euryops arabicus grow here, and on southern slopes there are succulent plants such as aloes and euphorbias. At lower elevations there is a shrubby forest with species including the Abyssinian rose and the camphor bush. Lower still, below about 2,000 m (6,560 ft), Acacia and myrrh are the dominant woody plants.

In the Hadhramaut region of southern Yemen, wheat and millet is grown and both coconut palms and date palms are cultivated, and frankincence also grows here. The western coastal Tihama plains are irrigated for the production of citrus, bananas and dates. Figs, coffee, khat, wheat, barley and sorghum are grown on the slopes above. On the Red Sea coast there are extensive stands of white mangrove over a coastal stretch of about 84 km (52 mi), with sporadic clumps elsewhere.

The sandy Rub' al Khali has very little plant diversity, including about 37 species of flowering plant recorded, 17 of which are only found around the periphery and no trees. Typical xeric plants include the dwarf shrubs Calligonum crinitum and saltbush, and several species of sedge.

== Fauna ==
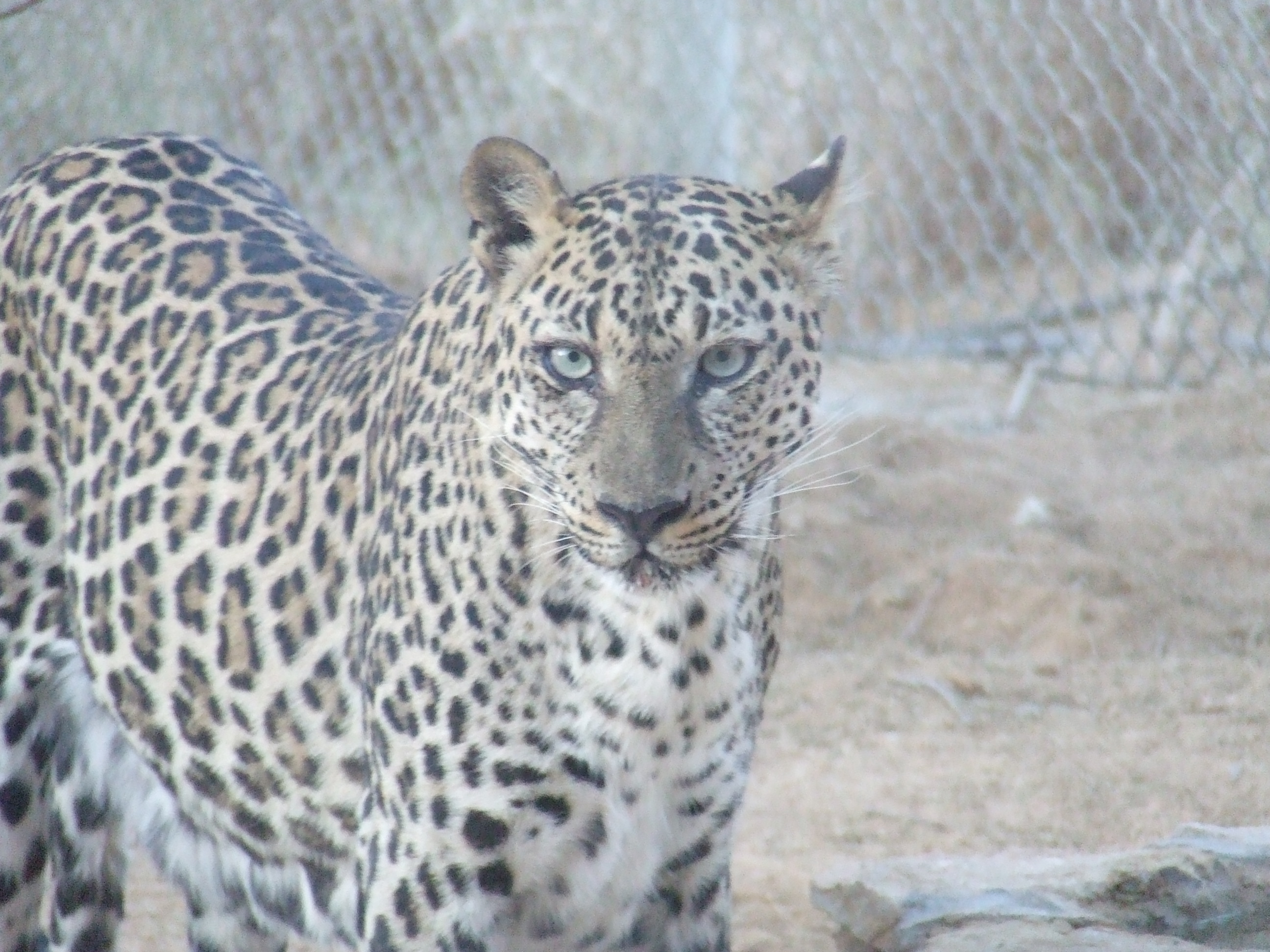
The critically endangered Arabian leopard

About 464 species of bird have been recorded in Yemen, ten of which are endemic to the country including the Socotra buzzard, the Socotra scops owl, the Socotra cisticola, the Socotra warbler, the Socotra starling, the Socotra sunbird, the Arabian accentor, the Socotra bunting, the Socotra sparrow, and the Abd al-Kuri sparrow. The cliff faces of the western highlands provide habitat for the griffon vulture, the Verreaux's eagle, and the small Barbary falcon. The juniper woodlands in the west are home to the Yemen linnet, Yemen thrush, Yemen warbler, and the African paradise flycatcher, and many migratory birds pass through this area twice a year.

The hamadryas baboon is present in parts of the country, and there are believed to be about seventy wild Arabian leopards remaining here. A captive breeding programme is being undertaken at Taiz Zoo in the Yemeni highlands. Other mammals found in Yemen include camels, the mountain gazelle, gray wolf, Blanford's fox, Rüppell's fox, caracal, sand cat, wildcat, common genet, striped hyena, golden jackal, honey badger, bushy-tailed mongoose, rock hyrax, desert hedgehog, Arabian shrew, golden spiny mouse, lesser Egyptian jerboa, several species of gerbils, king jird, Yemeni mouse and a number of species of bat.

Snakes found in Yemen include the Arabian cobra, the horned viper, and the puff adder, as well as several species of sea snakes. There is the endemic Yemen monitor, numerous species of lizard, several geckos, and the veiled chameleon. The African helmeted turtle and tortoise are found on land, and several species of sea turtle breed on the beaches.

Yemen has coastlines on the Red Sea and the Indian Ocean. These mostly have shallow fringing reefs where corals proliferate and a diverse invertebrate fauna. These reefs provide a spawning ground and a protective environment for the young of many species of fish. Marine mammals including whales and dolphins are found here, as are sharks and many species of fish. Sea birds proliferate along the coastline. The island of Socotra and its archipelago are also part of Yemen, about 240 km (150 mi) east of the Horn of Africa and 380 km (240 mi) south of the Arabian Peninsula. These islands have exceptionally high levels of endemism. About 37% of their roughly 825 plant species are found nowhere else, and endemism among reptiles and land snails exceeds 90%. The archipelago's unique flora and fauna have earned it recognition as one of the world's most biologically distinctive island systems.
