= Outline of Yemen =

Country in West Asia

The Flag of Yemen

The Emblem of Yemen

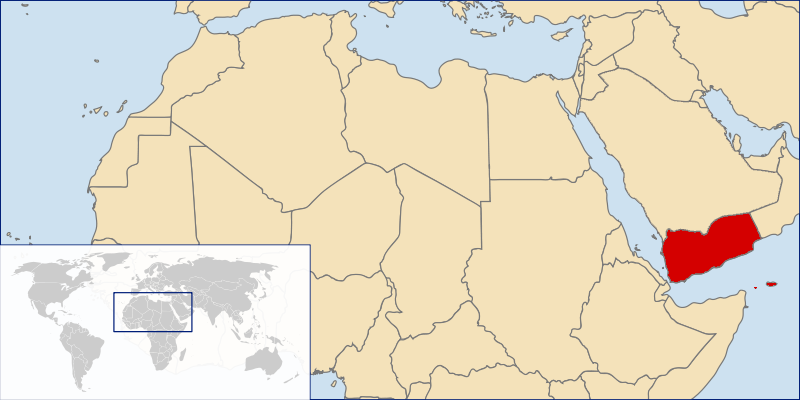
The location of Yemen

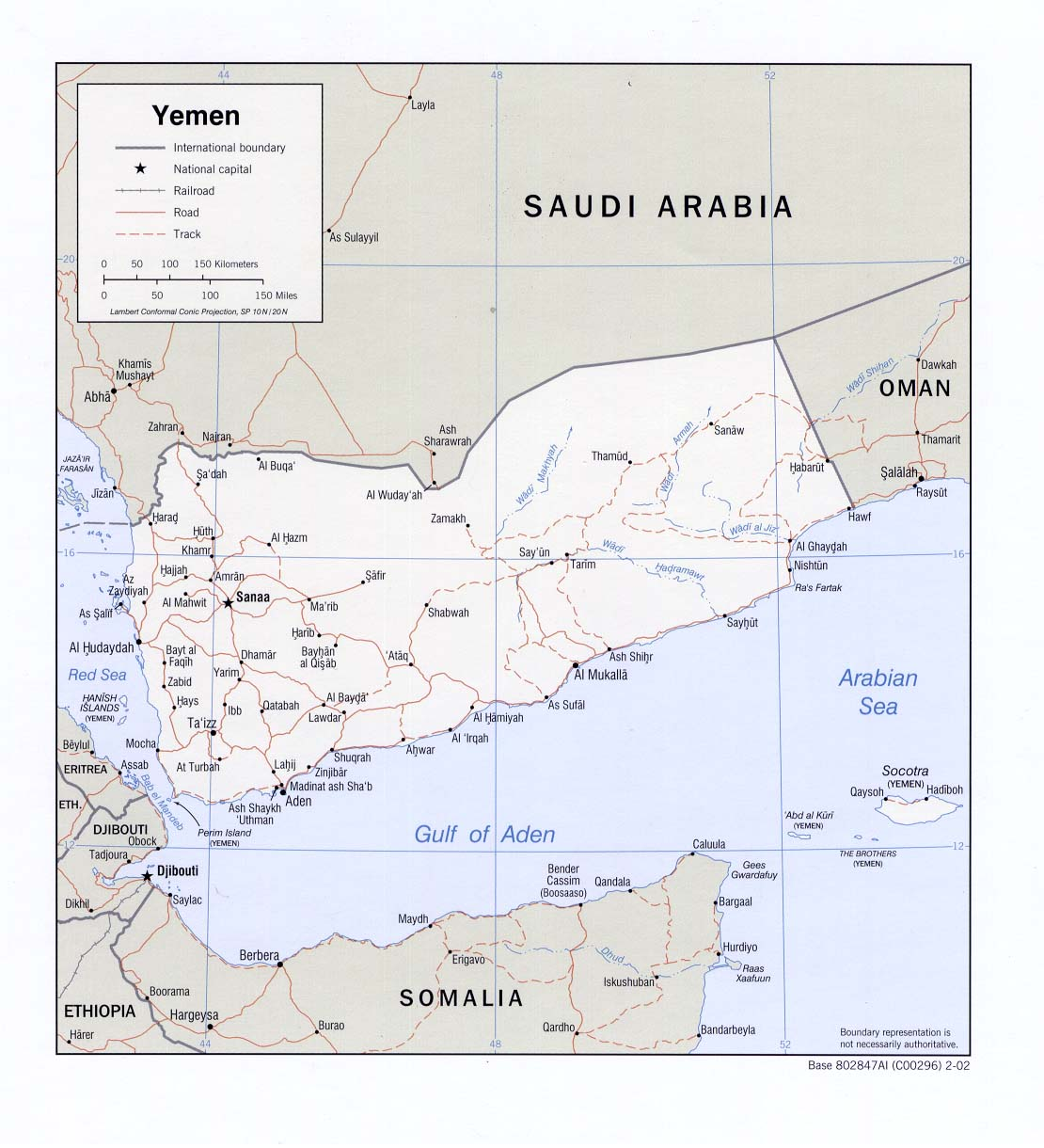
An enlargeable map of Yemen

The following outline is provided as an overview of and topical guide to Yemen:

Yemen – sovereign country located on the southern portion of the Arabian Peninsula in West Asia. With a population of more than 20 million people, Yemen is bordered by Saudi Arabia to the North, the Red Sea to the West, the Arabian Sea and Gulf of Aden to the South, and Oman to the east. Yemen's territory includes over 200 islands, the largest of which is Socotra, about 415 kilometres (259 miles) to the south of Yemen, off the coast of Somalia. Yemen is the only republic on the Arabian Peninsula.

== General reference ==
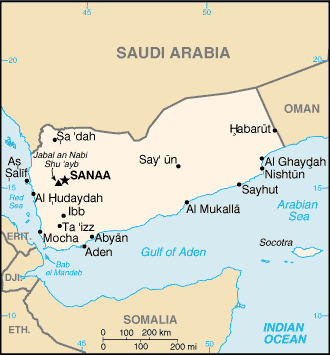
An enlargeable basic map of Yemen

- Pronunciation:
- Common English country name: Yemen
- Official English country name: The Republic of Yemen
- Common endonym(s):
- Official endonym(s):
- Adjectival(s): Yemeni
- Demonym(s):
- Etymology: Name of Yemen
- International rankings of Yemen
- ISO country codes: YE, YEM, 887
- ISO region codes: See ISO 3166-2:YE
- Internet country code top-level domain: .ye

== Geography of Yemen ==
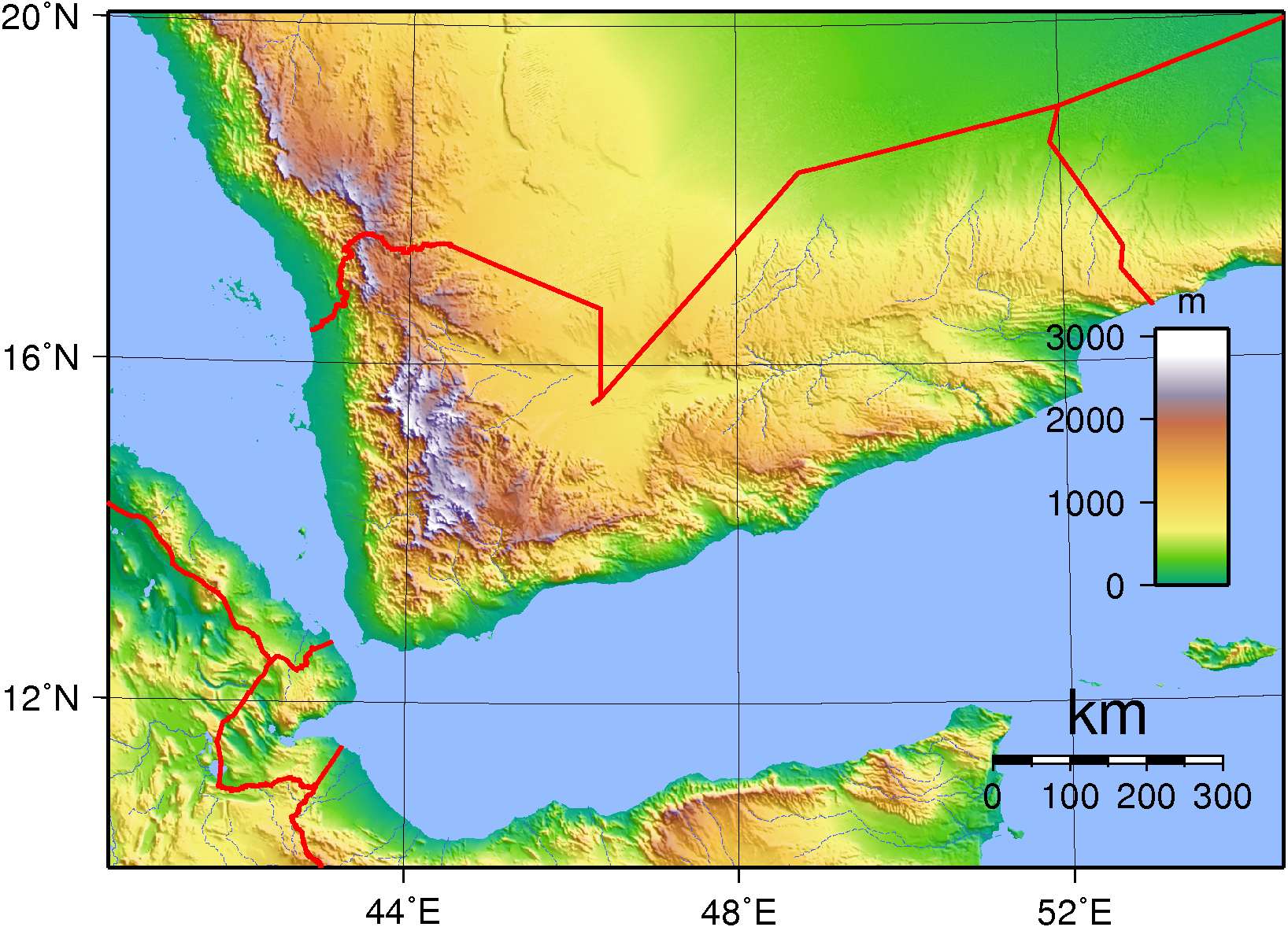
An enlargeable topographic map of Yemen

Geography of Yemen

- Yemen is: a country
- Location:
  - Northern Hemisphere and Eastern Hemisphere
  - Eurasia
    - Asia
      - Southwest Asia
  - Middle East
    - Arabian Peninsula
  - Time zone: UTC+03
  - Extreme points of Yemen
    - High: Jabal An-Nabi Shu'ayb 3,666 m (12,028 ft)
    - Low: Arabian Sea 0 m
  - Land boundaries: 1,746 km

Saudi Arabia 1,458 km
Oman 288 km

- Coastline: 1,906 km

- Population of Yemen: 22,389,000 - 50th most populous country
- Area of Yemen: 527,968 km^{2}
- Atlas of Yemen

=== Environment of Yemen ===
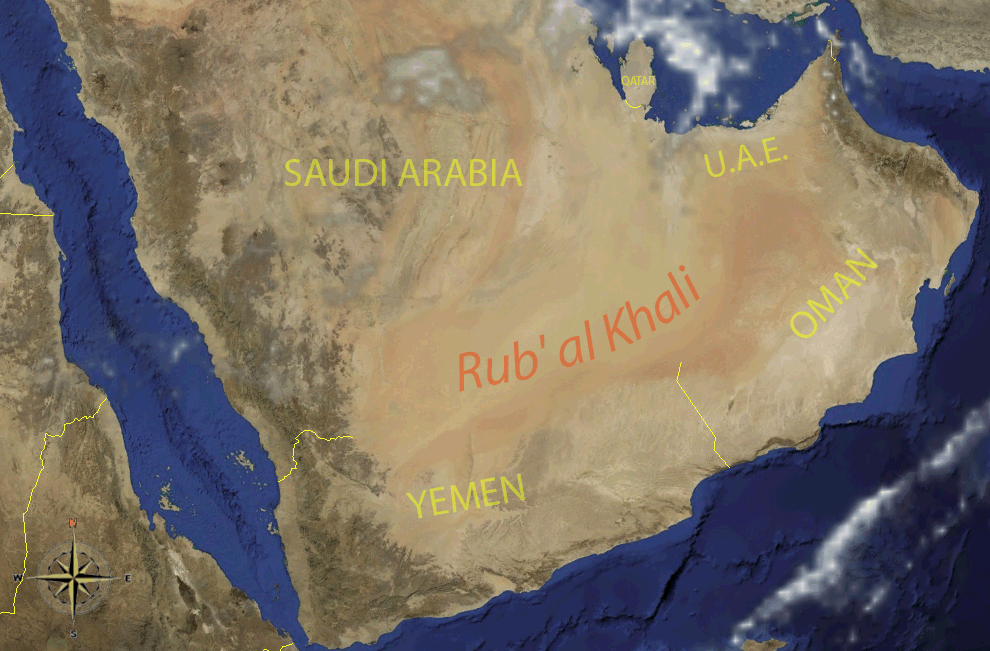
An enlargeable satellite image of Yemen

- Climate of Yemen
- Ecoregions in Yemen
- Renewable energy in Yemen
- Geology of Yemen
- Protected areas of Yemen
  - Biosphere reserves in Yemen
  - National parks of Yemen
- Wildlife of Yemen
  - Fauna of Yemen
    - Birds of Yemen
    - Mammals of Yemen

==== Natural geographic features of Yemen ====
- Glaciers of Yemen: none
- Islands of Yemen
- Lakes of Yemen
- Mountains of Yemen
  - Volcanoes in Yemen
- Rivers of Yemen
  - Waterfalls of Yemen
- Valleys of Yemen
- World Heritage Sites in Yemen

=== Regions of Yemen ===
Regions of Yemen

==== Ecoregions of Yemen ====
List of ecoregions in Yemen

==== Administrative divisions of Yemen ====
Yemen is divided into 21 governorates, subdivided into 333 districts (muderiah) and 2,210 sub-districts.

- Governorates of Yemen
  - The Municipality of Yemen
    - Districts of Yemen
      - Sub-districts of Yemen

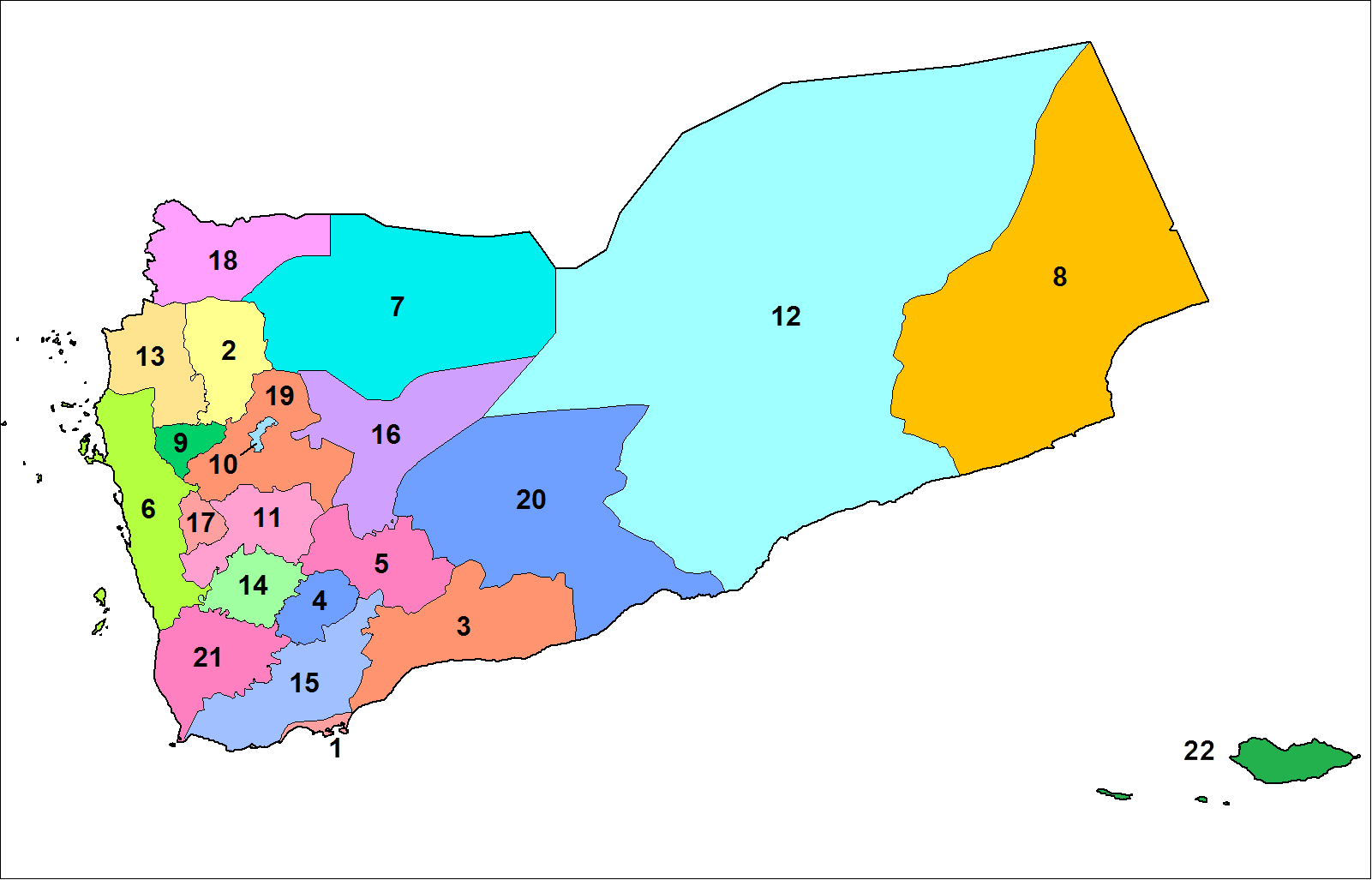
Governorates of Yemen

| Governorate | Arabic | Capital City | Area km^{2} | Pop (2004) | Map Key |
|---|---|---|---|---|---|
| 'Adan | عدن | Aden | 825 | 589,419 | 1 |
| 'Amran | عمران | 'Amran | 9,013 | 877,786 | 2 |
| Abyan | أبين | Zinjibar | 20,380 | 433,819 | 3 |
| Ad Dali' | الضالع | Ad Dali' | 4,448 | 470,564 | 4 |
| Al Bayda' | البيضاء | Al Bayda | 10,487 | 577,369 | 5 |
| Al Hudaydah | الحديدة | Al Hudaydah | 15,407 | 2,157,552 | 6 |
| Al Jawf | الجوف | Al Jawf | 46,170 | 443,797 | 7 |
| Al Mahrah | المهرة | Al Ghaydah | 78,073 | 88,594 | 8 |
| Al Mahwit | المحويت | Al Mahwit | 2,452 | 494,557 | 9 |
| Amanat Al Asimah | أَمَانَة ٱلْعَاصِمَة | San'a' | 126 | 1,747,834 | 10 |
| Dhamar | ذمار | Dhamar | 8,705 | 1,330,108 | 11 |
| Hadramaut | حضرموت | Mukalla | 195,626 | 1,028,556 | 12 |
| Hajjah | حجة | Hajjah | 9,376 | 1,479,568 | 13 |
| Ibb | إب | Ibb | 6,031 | 2,131,861 | 14 |
| Lahij | لحج | Lahij | 14,003 | 722,694 | 15 |
| Ma'rib | مأرب | Ma'rib | 19,529 | 238,522 | 16 |
| Raymah | ريمة | Al Jabin | 2,239 | 394,448 | 17 |
| Sa'dah | صعدة | Sa'dah | 14,364 | 695,033 | 18 |
| Sana'a | محافظة صنعاء | San'a' | 13,730 | 919,215 | 19 |
| Shabwah | شبوة | Ataq | 45,519 | 470,440 | 20 |
| Ta'izz | تعز | Ta'izz | 11,573 | 2,393,425 | 21 |
| Socotra | سقطرى | Hadibou | 3,796 | 175,020 | 22 |

===== Districts of Yemen =====
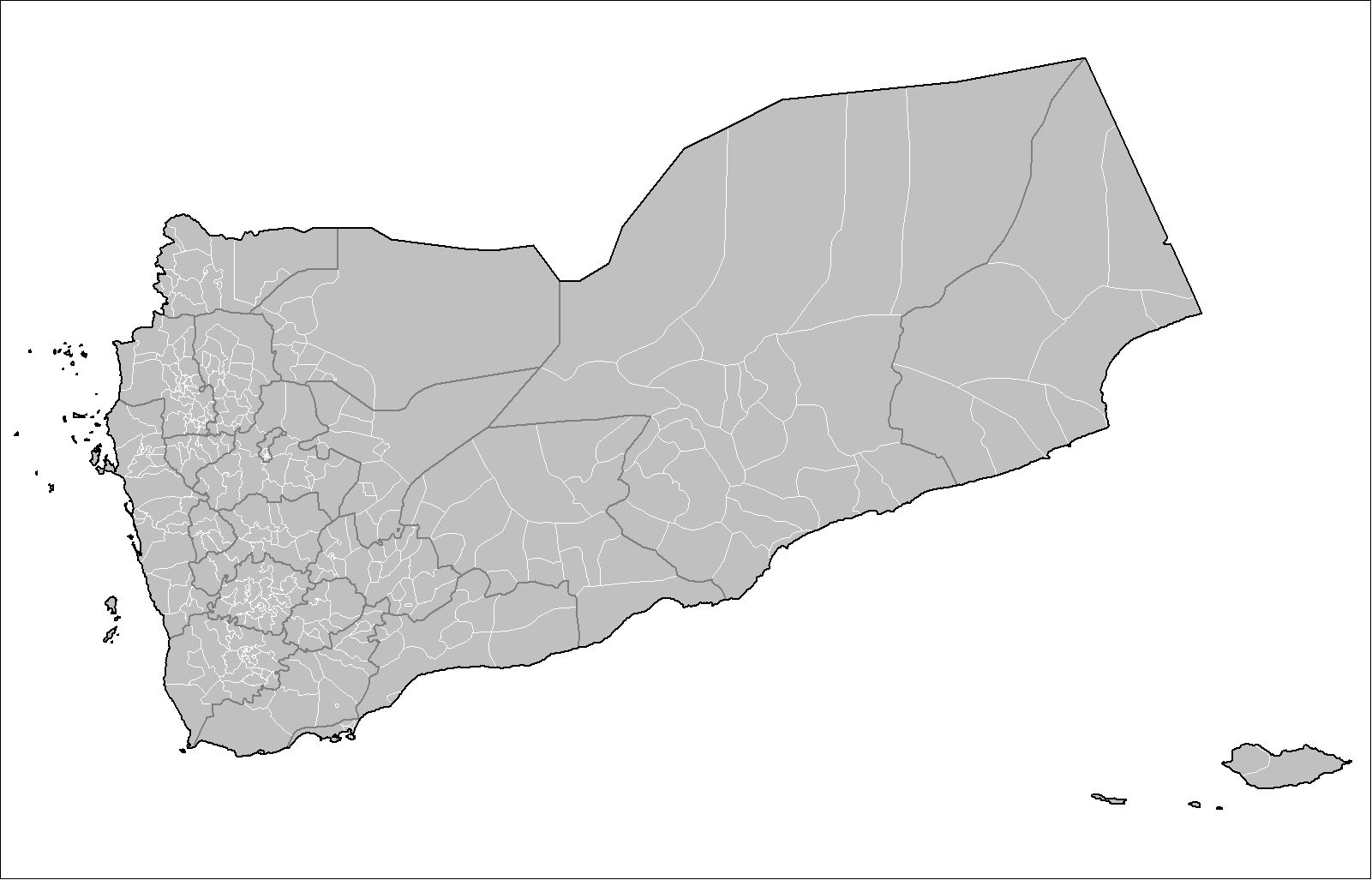

- The governorates of Yemen are divided into 333 districts (muderiah).
- Yemen's districts are subdivided into 2,210 sub-districts, and then into 38,284 villages (as of 2001)
- Capital of Yemen:
  - Sana'a (de jure)
  - Aden (de facto, provisional)
- Cities of Yemen

=== Demography of Yemen ===
Demographics of Yemen

== Government and politics of Yemen ==
- Form of government: Semi-presidential representative democratic republic
- Capital of Yemen: Sana'a
- Elections in Yemen
- Political parties in Yemen

=== Branches of the government of Yemen ===
Cabinet of Yemen

==== Executive branch of the government of Yemen ====
- Head of state: President of Yemen, Rashad Al-Alimi (claimed by Mahdi al-Mashat)
- Vice President of Yemen, Tareq Saleh &Sultan Ali al-Aradah & Abdullah al-Alimi Bawazeer
  - Head of government: Prime Minister of Yemen, Shaea al-Zindani (claimed by Muhammad Ahmed Miftah)
- Cabinet of Yemen

==== Legislative branch of the government of Yemen ====
- Parliament of Yemen (bicameral)
  - Upper house: Consultative Council of Yemen
  - Lower house: Assembly of Representatives of Yemen

==== Judicial branch of the government of Yemen ====
Court system of Yemen

- Supreme Court of Yemen (ar)
- Commercial Courts of Yemen

=== Foreign relations of Yemen ===
Foreign relations of Yemen

- Diplomatic missions in Yemen
- Diplomatic missions of Yemen

The Republic of Yemen is a member of:

- African Union/United Nations Hybrid operation in Darfur (UNAMID)
- Arab Fund for Economic and Social Development (AFESD)
- Arab Monetary Fund (AMF)
- Council of Arab Economic Unity (CAEU)
- Food and Agriculture Organization (FAO)
- Group of 77 (G77)
- International Atomic Energy Agency (IAEA)
- International Bank for Reconstruction and Development (IBRD)
- International Civil Aviation Organization (ICAO)
- International Criminal Court (ICCt) (signatory)
- International Criminal Police Organization (Interpol)
- International Development Association (IDA)
- International Federation of Red Cross and Red Crescent Societies (IFRCS)
- International Finance Corporation (IFC)
- International Fund for Agricultural Development (IFAD)
- International Labour Organization (ILO)
- International Maritime Organization (IMO)
- International Monetary Fund (IMF)
- International Olympic Committee (IOC)
- International Organization for Migration (IOM)
- International Organization for Standardization (ISO) (correspondent)
- International Red Cross and Red Crescent Movement (ICRM)
- International Telecommunication Union (ITU)
- International Telecommunications Satellite Organization (ITSO)
- International Trade Union Confederation (ITUC)
- Inter-Parliamentary Union (IPU)
- Islamic Development Bank (IDB)
- League of Arab States (LAS)
- Multilateral Investment Guarantee Agency (MIGA)
- Nonaligned Movement (NAM)
- Organisation of Islamic Cooperation (OIC)
- Organisation for the Prohibition of Chemical Weapons (OPCW)
- Organization of American States (OAS) (observer)
- United Nations (UN)
- United Nations Conference on Trade and Development (UNCTAD)
- United Nations Educational, Scientific, and Cultural Organization (UNESCO)
- United Nations High Commissioner for Refugees (UNHCR)
- United Nations Industrial Development Organization (UNIDO)
- United Nations Mission for the Referendum in Western Sahara (MINURSO)
- United Nations Mission in Liberia (UNMIL)
- United Nations Mission in the Central African Republic and Chad (MINURCAT)
- United Nations Mission in the Sudan (UNMIS)
- United Nations Observer Mission in Georgia (UNOMIG)
- United Nations Operation in Cote d'Ivoire (UNOCI)
- United Nations Organization Mission in the Democratic Republic of the Congo (MONUC)
- Universal Postal Union (UPU)
- World Customs Organization (WCO)
- World Federation of Trade Unions (WFTU)
- World Health Organization (WHO)
- World Intellectual Property Organization (WIPO)
- World Meteorological Organization (WMO)
- World Tourism Organization (UNWTO)
- World Trade Organization (WTO) (observer)

Law and order in Zambia

- Constitution of Yemen
- Human rights in Yemen
  - Abortion in Yemen
  - LGBTQ rights in Yemen
  - Women in Yemen
  - Freedom of religion in yemen
  - Mobile schools in Yemen

=== Military of Yemen ===
- Command
  - Commander-in-chief: President of Yemen & Chairman of the Supreme Political Council
    - Ministry of Defense
- Military:
  - Army
  - Air Force
  - Navy
  - Border Guard Forces
  - Yemeni strategic reserve forces (ar) :
    - Special forces of Yemen (ar)
    - Yemeni presidential protection forces (ar)
    - missile brigades (Yemen) (ar)
  - Reserve forces for the Ministry of Defense (Yemen) (ar) :
- Military history of Yemen(ar)
  - 1st Armoured Division (ar)
  - Republican Guard
- Military ranks of Yemen (ar)

=== Local government in Yemen ===
Local government in Yemen

== History of Yemen ==
- Imams of Yemen
- List of rulers of Saba and Himyar
- Timeline of Yemeni history

== Culture of Yemen ==
- Architecture of Yemen
- Cuisine of Yemen
- Festivals in Yemen
- Languages of Yemen
- Media in Yemen
- National symbols of Yemen
  - Emblem of Yemen
  - Flag of Yemen
  - National anthem of Yemen
- Prostitution in Yemen
- Public holidays in Yemen
- Religion in Yemen
  - Christianity in Yemen
  - Hinduism in Yemen
  - Islam in Yemen
  - Judaism in Yemen
  - Sikhism in Yemen

=== Art in Yemen ===
- Cinema of Yemen
- Literature of Yemen
- Music of Yemen
- Television in Yemen
- Theatre in Yemen

=== Sports in Yemen ===
- Football in Yemen
- Yemen at the Olympics

== Economy and infrastructure of Yemen ==
- Economic rank, by nominal GDP (2007): 88th (eighty-eighth)
- Agriculture in Yemen
- Banking in Yemen
  - National Bank of Yemen
- Communications in Yemen
  - Internet in Yemen
- Companies of Yemen
- Currency of Yemen: Rial
  - ISO 4217: YER
- Energy in Yemen
  - Energy policy of Yemen
  - Oil industry in Yemen
- Mining in Yemen
- Yemen Stock Exchange
- Tourism in Yemen
- Transport in Yemen
  - Airports in Yemen
  - Rail transport in Yemen
  - Roads in Yemen
- Water supply and sanitation in Yemen

== See also ==
- List of international rankings
- List of Yemen-related topics
- Member state of the United Nations
- Outline of Asia
- Outline of geography
