= List of mammals of Yemen =

This is a list of the mammal species recorded in Yemen. There are sixty-nine mammal species in Yemen, of which two are endangered, seven are vulnerable, and three are near threatened. Two of the species listed for Yemen are extinct.

The following tags are used to highlight each species' conservation status as assessed by the International Union for Conservation of Nature:

EX	Extinct	No reasonable doubt that the last individual has died.
EW	Extinct in the wild	Known only to survive in captivity or as a naturalized populations well outside its previous range.
CR	Critically endangered	The species is in imminent risk of extinction in the wild.
EN	Endangered	The species is facing an extremely high risk of extinction in the wild.
VU	Vulnerable	The species is facing a high risk of extinction in the wild.
NT	Near threatened	The species does not meet any of the criteria that would categorise it as risking extinction but it is likely to do so in the future.
LC	Least concern	There are no current identifiable risks to the species.
DD	Data deficient	There is inadequate information to make an assessment of the risks to this species.

== Order: Hyracoidea (hyraxes) ==
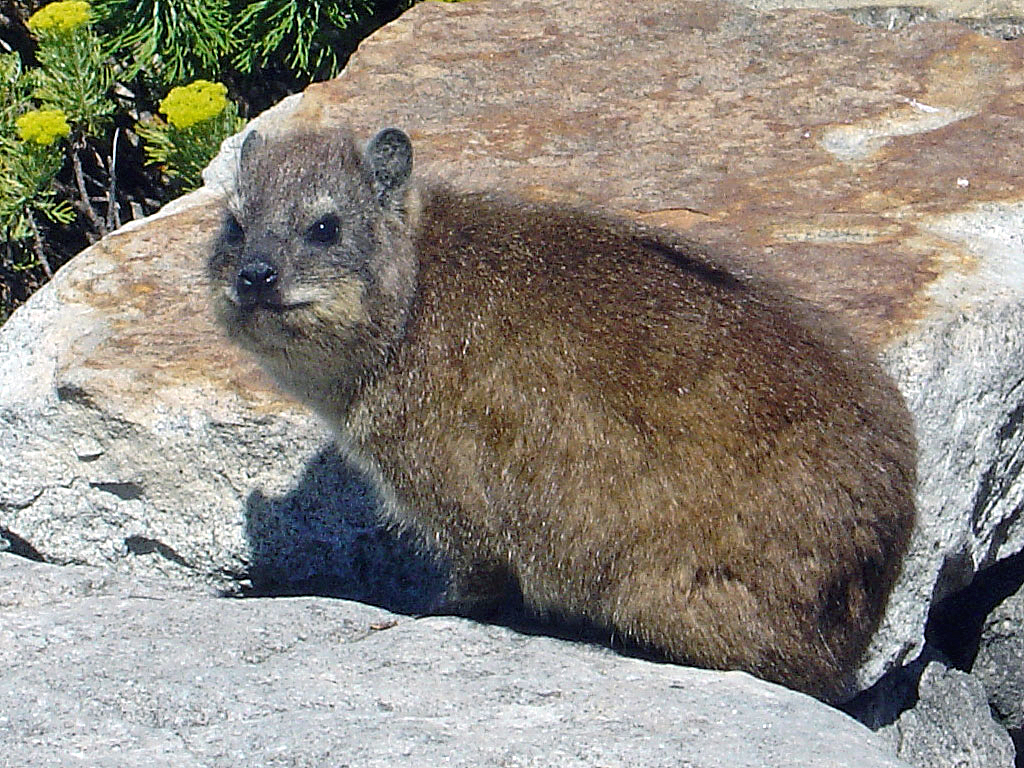
Cape hyrax

The hyraxes are four species of fairly small, thickset, herbivorous mammals in the order Hyracoidea. About the size of a domestic cat, they are well-furred, with rounded bodies and a stumpy tail. They are native to Africa and the Middle East.

- Family: Procaviidae (hyraxes)
  - Genus: Procavia
    - Cape hyrax, P. capensis LC

== Order: Sirenia (manatees and dugongs) ==
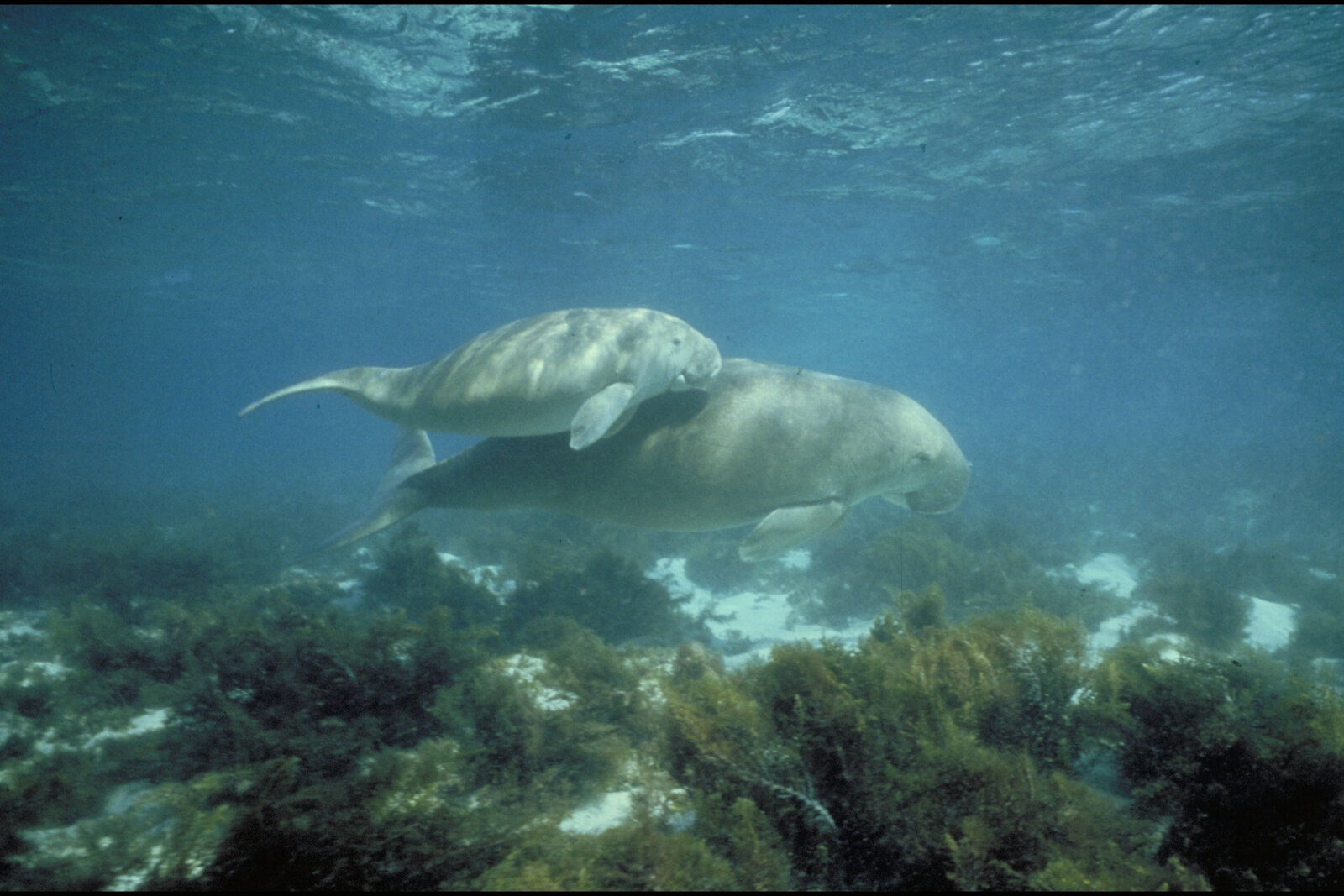
Dugongs

Sirenia is an order of fully aquatic, herbivorous mammals that inhabit rivers, estuaries, coastal marine waters, swamps, and marine wetlands. All four species are endangered.

- Family: Dugongidae
  - Genus: Dugong
    - Dugong, D. dugon VU

== Order: Primates ==
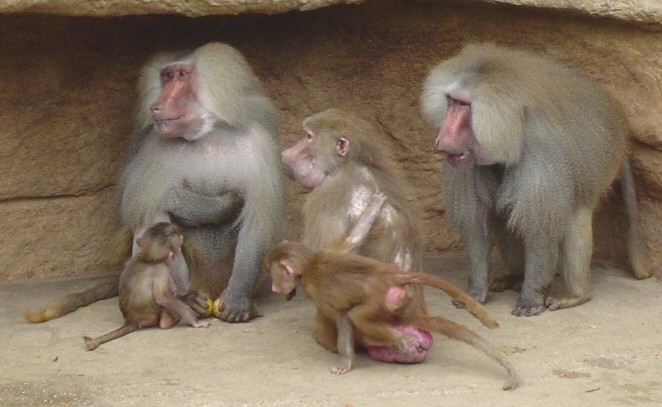
Hamadryas baboons

The order Primates contains humans and their closest relatives: lemurs, lorisoids, monkeys, and apes.

- Suborder: Haplorhini
  - Infraorder: Simiiformes
    - Parvorder: Catarrhini
      - Superfamily: Cercopithecoidea
        - Family: Cercopithecidae (Old World monkeys)
          - Genus: Papio
            - Hamadryas baboon, P. hamadryas LC

== Order: Rodentia (rodents) ==
Rodents make up the largest order of mammals, with over 40% of mammalian species. They have two incisors in the upper and lower jaw which grow continually and must be kept short by gnawing. Most rodents are small though the capybara can weigh up to 45 kg (99 lb).

- Suborder: Hystricognathi
  - Family: Hystricidae (Old World porcupines)
    - Genus: Hystrix
      - Indian crested porcupine, H. indica LC
- Suborder: Sciurognathi
  - Family: Dipodidae (jerboas)
    - Subfamily: Dipodinae
      - Genus: Jaculus
        - Lesser Egyptian jerboa, J. jaculus LC
  - Family: Muridae (mice, rats, voles, gerbils, hamsters)
    - Subfamily: Deomyinae
      - Genus: Acomys
        - Cairo spiny mouse, Acomys cahirinus LC
        - Golden spiny mouse, Acomys russatus
    - Subfamily: Gerbillinae
      - Genus: Gerbillus
        - Cheesman's gerbil, Gerbillus cheesmani
        - Wagner's gerbil, Gerbillus dasyurus
        - Black-tufted gerbil, Gerbillus famulus
        - Pygmy gerbil, Gerbillus henleyi LC
        - Balochistan gerbil, Gerbillus nanus LC
        - Large Aden gerbil, Gerbillus poecilops
      - Genus: Meriones
        - King jird, Meriones rex
    - Subfamily: Murinae
      - Genus: Arvicanthis
        - African grass rat, A. niloticus LC
      - Genus: Myomyscus
        - Yemeni mouse, Myomys Yemeni

== Order: Lagomorpha (lagomorphs) ==
Lagomorphs comprise rabbits, hares, and pikas. Unlike rodents; they have four incisors on their upper jaws.

- Family: Leporidae (rabbits and hares)
  - Genus: Lepus
    - Cape hare, L. capensis LC

== Order: Erinaceomorpha (hedgehogs and gymnures) ==
The order Erinaceomorpha contains a single family, Erinaceidae, which comprise the hedgehogs and gymnures. The hedgehogs are easily recognised by their spines while gymnures look more like large rats.

- Family: Erinaceidae (hedgehogs)
  - Subfamily: Erinaceinae
    - Genus: Paraechinus
      - Desert hedgehog, P. aethiopicus LC

== Order: Soricomorpha (shrews, moles, and solenodons) ==
The "shrew-forms" are insectivorous mammals. The shrews and solenodons closely resemble mice while the moles are stout-bodied burrowers.

- Family: Soricidae (shrews)
  - Subfamily: Crocidurinae
    - Genus: Crocidura
      - Arabian shrew, Crocidura arabica

== Order: Chiroptera (bats) ==
The bats' most distinguishing feature is that their forelimbs are developed as wings, making them the only mammals capable of flight. Bat species account for about 20% of all mammals.

- Family: Pteropodidae (flying foxes, Old World fruit bats)
  - Subfamily: Pteropodinae
    - Genus: Eidolon
      - Straw-coloured fruit bat, Eidolon helvum LC
    - Genus: Rousettus
      - Egyptian fruit bat, Rousettus aegyptiacus LC
- Family: Vespertilionidae
  - Subfamily: Myotinae
    - Genus: Myotis
      - Rufous mouse-eared bat, Myotis bocagii LC
  - Subfamily: Vespertilioninae
    - Genus: Eptesicus
      - Botta's serotine, Eptesicus bottae LC
    - Genus: Hypsugo
      - Bodenheimer's pipistrelle, Hypsugo bodenheimeri
    - Genus: Nycticeinops
      - Schlieffen's twilight bat, Nycticeinops schlieffeni LC
    - Genus: Pipistrellus
      - Kuhl's pipistrelle, Pipistrellus kuhlii LC
    - Genus: Rhyneptesicus
      - Sind bat, R. nasutus LC
  - Subfamily: Miniopterinae
    - Genus: Miniopterus
      - Common bent-wing bat, M. schreibersii VU
- Family: Rhinopomatidae
  - Genus: Rhinopoma
    - Egyptian mouse-tailed bat, R. cystops LC
    - Lesser mouse-tailed bat, Rhinopoma hardwickei LC
    - Greater mouse-tailed bat, Rhinopoma microphyllum LC
- Family: Molossidae
  - Genus: Chaerephon
    - Little free-tailed bat, Chaerephon pumila LC
  - Genus: Otomops
    - Harrison's large-eared giant mastiff bat, Otomops harrisoni VU
  - Genus: Tadarida
    - Egyptian free-tailed bat, Tadarida aegyptiaca LC
- Family: Emballonuridae
  - Genus: Coleura
    - African sheath-tailed bat, Coleura afra LC
- Family: Emballonuridae
  - Genus: Taphozous
    - Egyptian tomb bat, T. perforatus LC
- Family: Nycteridae
  - Genus: Nycteris
    - Egyptian slit-faced bat, Nycteris thebaica LC
- Family: Rhinolophidae
  - Subfamily: Rhinolophinae
    - Genus: Rhinolophus
      - Blasius's horseshoe bat, R. blasii LC
      - Geoffroy's horseshoe bat, Rhinolophus clivosus LC
  - Subfamily: Hipposiderinae
    - Genus: Asellia
      - Trident leaf-nosed bat, Asellia tridens LC
    - Genus: Hipposideros
      - Sundevall's roundleaf bat, Hipposideros caffer LC
    - Genus: Triaenops
      - Persian trident bat, Triaenops persicus LC

== Order: Cetacea (whales) ==
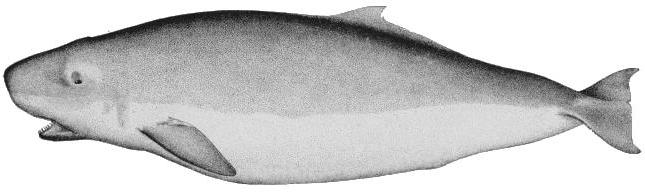
Pygmy sperm whale

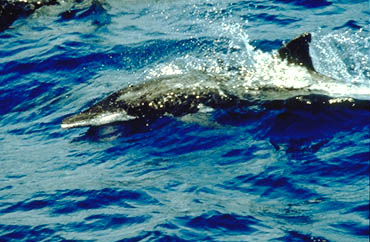
Rough-toothed dolphin

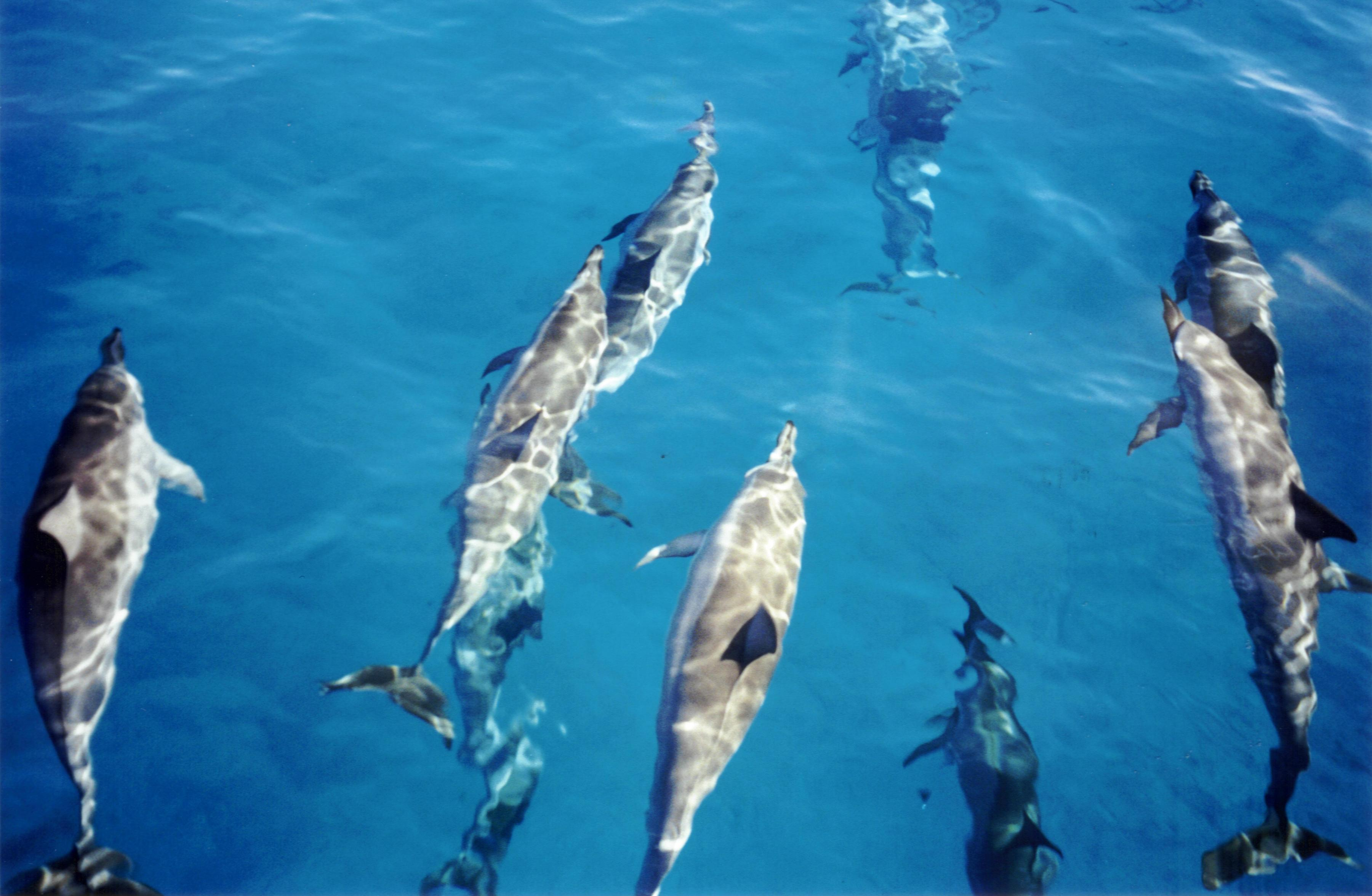
Spinner dolphins

The order Cetacea includes whales, dolphins and porpoises. They are the mammals most fully adapted to aquatic life with a spindle-shaped nearly hairless body, protected by a thick layer of blubber, and forelimbs and tail modified to provide propulsion underwater.

- Suborder: Mysticeti
  - Family: Balaenopteridae
    - Subfamily: Balaenopterinae
      - Genus: Balaenoptera
        - Bryde's whale, Balaenoptera edeni DD
    - Subfamily: Megapterinae
      - Genus: Megaptera
        - Humpback whale, M. novaeangliae LC
- Suborder: Odontoceti
  - Superfamily: Platanistoidea
    - Family: Physeteridae (sperm whales)
      - Genus: Physeter
        - Sperm whale, Physeter macrocephalus VU
    - Family: Kogiidae
      - Genus: Kogia
        - Pygmy sperm whale, K. breviceps DD
        - Dwarf sperm whale, Kogia sima
    - Family: Ziphidae
      - Subfamily: Hyperoodontinae
        - Genus: Indopacetus
          - Longman's beaked whale, I. pacificus DD
        - Genus: Mesoplodon
          - Blainville's beaked whale, Mesoplodon densirostris DD
    - Family: Delphinidae (marine dolphins)
      - Genus: Steno
        - Rough-toothed dolphin, Steno bredanensis DD
      - Genus: Sousa
        - Chinese white dolphin, Sousa chinensis DD
      - Genus: Tursiops
        - Common bottlenose dolphin, Tursiops truncatus DD
        - Indo-Pacific bottlenose dolphin, Tursiops aduncus DD
      - Genus: Stenella
        - Spinner dolphin, Stenella longirostris DD
        - Pantropical spotted dolphin, Stenella attenuata
      - Genus: Delphinus
        - Common dolphin, Delphinus capensis
      - Genus: Lagenodelphis
        - Fraser's dolphin, Lagenodelphis hosei DD
      - Genus: Grampus
        - Risso's dolphin, Grampus griseus DD
      - Genus: Feresa
        - Pygmy killer whale, Feresa attenuata DD
      - Genus: Pseudorca
        - False killer whale, Pseudorca crassidens EN

== Order: Carnivora (carnivorans) ==
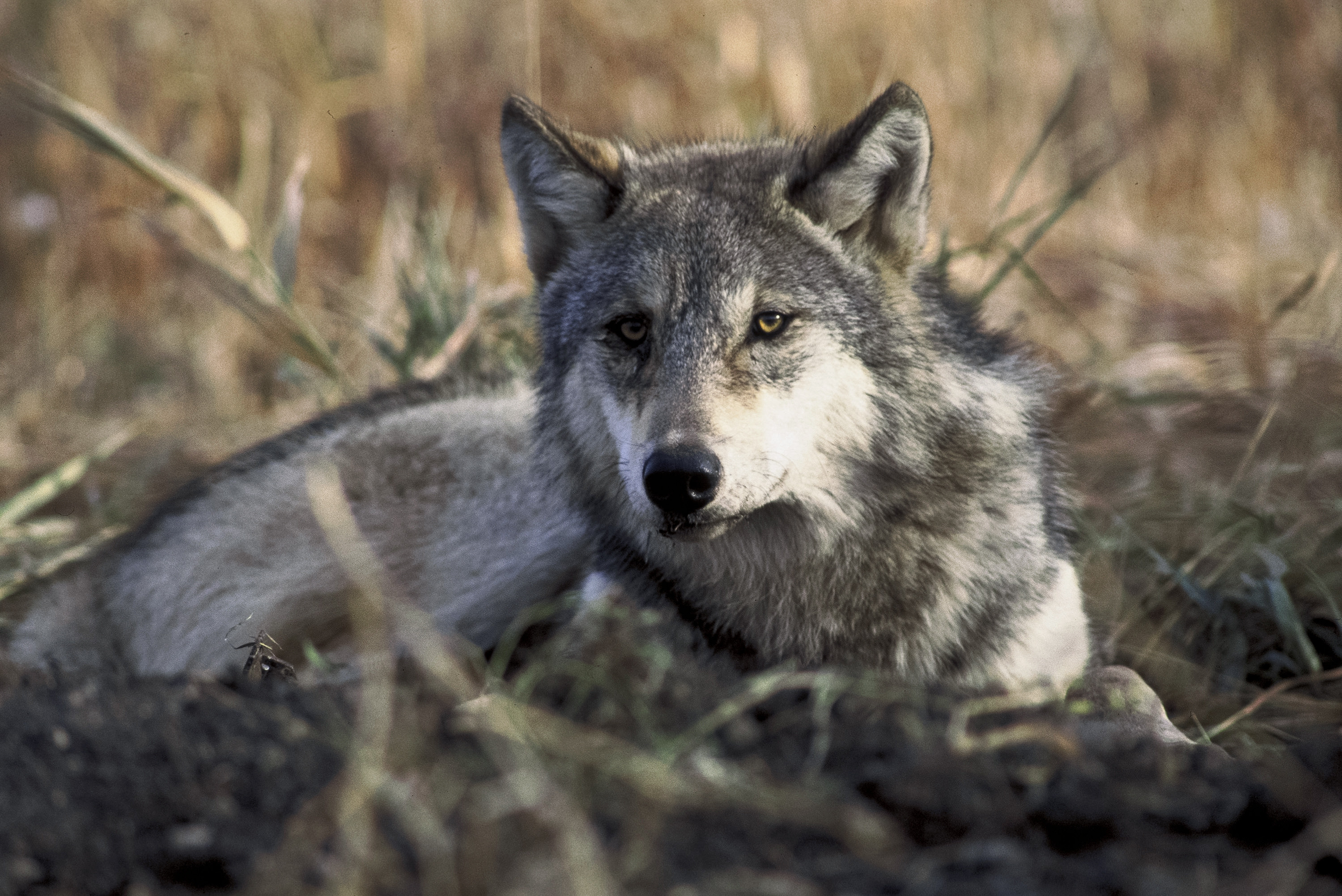
Gray wolf

There are over 260 species of carnivorans, the majority of which feed primarily on meat. They have a characteristic skull shape and dentition.

- Suborder: Feliformia
  - Family: Felidae (cats)
    - Subfamily: Felinae
      - Genus: Caracal
        - Caracal, C. caracal LC
      - Genus: Felis
        - African wildcat, F. lybica LC
        - Sand cat, F. margarita LC possibly extirpated
    - Subfamily: Pantherinae
      - Genus: Panthera
        - Leopard, P. pardus VU
          - Arabian leopard, P. p. nimr CR
  - Family: Viverridae
    - Subfamily: Viverrinae
      - Genus: Genetta
        - Common genet, G. genetta LC
  - Family: Herpestidae (mongooses)
    - Genus: Bdeogale
      - Bushy-tailed mongoose, B. crassicauda LC presence uncertain, introduced
    - Genus: Ichneumia
      - White-tailed mongoose, I. albicauda LC
  - Family: Hyaenidae (hyaenas)
    - Genus: Hyaena
      - Striped hyena, H. hyaena NT
- Suborder: Caniformia
  - Family: Canidae (dogs, foxes)
    - Genus: Vulpes
      - Blanford's fox, V. cana LC
      - Rüppell's fox, V. rueppellii LC
      - Red fox, V. vulpes LC
    - Genus: Canis
      - Golden jackal, C. aureus LC
      - Gray wolf, C. lupus LC
        - Arabian wolf, C. l. arabs
  - Family: Mustelidae (mustelids)
    - Genus: Mellivora
      - Honey badger, M. capensis LC

== Order: Artiodactyla (even-toed ungulates) ==
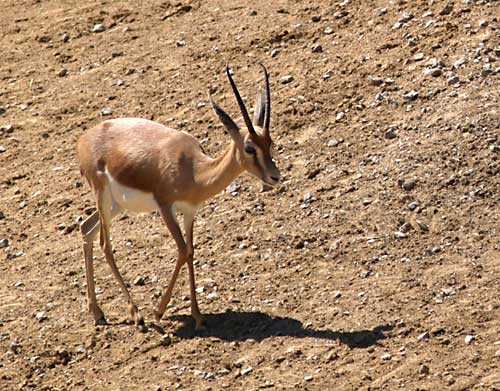
Dorcas gazelle

The even-toed ungulates are ungulates whose weight is borne about equally by the third and fourth toes, rather than mostly or entirely by the third as in perissodactyls. There are about 220 artiodactyl species, including many that are of great economic importance to humans.

- Family: Bovidae (cattle, antelope, sheep, goats)
  - Subfamily: Antilopinae
    - Genus: Gazella
      - Arabian gazelle, G. arabica VU
      - Queen of Sheba's gazelle, G. bilkis EX
      - Arabian sand gazelle, G. marica VU
  - Subfamily: Caprinae
    - Genus: Capra
      - Nubian ibex, C. nubiana VU

== Locally extinct ==
The following species are locally extinct in the country:

- Cheetah, Acinonyx jubatus
- Saudi gazelle, Gazella saudiya
- Arabian oryx, Oryx leucoryx

== See also ==
- List of chordate orders
- Lists of mammals by region
- List of prehistoric mammals
- Mammal classification
- List of mammals described in the 2000s
