= Brockman's rock mouse =

Conservation status
- Least Concern (IUCN 3.1)

Scientific classification
- Kingdom: Animalia
- Phylum: Chordata
- Class: Mammalia
- Order: Rodentia
- Family: Muridae
- Genus: Ochromyscus
- Species: O. brockmani

Binomial name
- Ochromyscus brockmani (Thomas, 1908)

Synonyms
- Myomyscus brockmani

Species of rodent

Brockman's rock mouse, or Brockman's myomyscus (Ochromyscus brockmani) is a species of rodent in the family Muridae. It is found in Central African Republic, Ethiopia, Kenya, Somalia, Sudan, Tanzania, Uganda, and possibly Republic of the Congo. Its natural habitats are dry savanna and rocky areas.
