= Ochromyscus =

Scientific classification
- Kingdom: Animalia
- Phylum: Chordata
- Class: Mammalia
- Order: Rodentia
- Family: Muridae
- Tribe: Praomyini
- Genus: Ochromyscus; Nicolas et al., 2021

Species
- O. brockmani; O. yemeni

Rock mouse of the Arabian Peninsula

Ochromyscus is a genus of rodent in the family Muridae.

It contains three species from Sub-Saharan Africa and the Arabian Peninsula, both of which were formerly classified in Myomyscus:

- Brockman's rock mouse, Ochromyscus brockmani
- Snowy white-bellied rock mouse, Ochromyscus niveiventris
- Yemeni mouse, Ochromyscus yemeni
