= International rankings of Yemen =

These are the international rankings of Yemen.

== Military ==
- Institute for Economics and Peace Global Peace Index ranked 119 out of 144

== Politics ==
- Transparency International 2021 Corruption Perceptions Index ranked 176 out of 179
- Fund for Peace 2010 Failed States Index ranked 15
- Economist Intelligence Unit Shoe-Thrower's index ranked first
- Good Country Index 2017, ranked 160 out of 163.
- Democracy Index 2020, rank 157 out of 167.

== Society ==
- United Nations Development Programme Human Development Index ranked 140 out of 182
- Press Freedom Index 2017, ranked 179 out of 198.
- Gender Inequality Index 2019, ranking 162 out of 162.
- Ease of Doing Business Index by the World Bank in 2020 ranked 187 out of 190.
- Human capital index in 2018, rank 145 out of 157.

== Technology ==
- World Intellectual Property Organization: Global Innovation Index 2022, ranked 128 out of 132 countries
