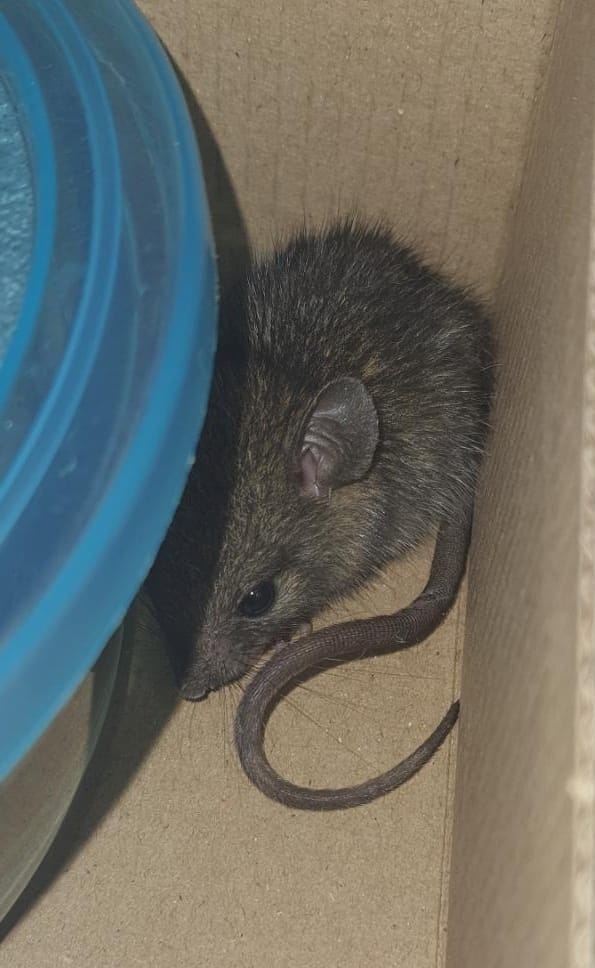

Conservation status
- Least Concern (IUCN 3.1)

Scientific classification
- Kingdom: Animalia
- Phylum: Chordata
- Class: Mammalia
- Infraclass: Placentalia
- Order: Rodentia
- Family: Muridae
- Tribe: Praomyini
- Genus: Myomyscus; Shortridge, 1942
- Species: M. verreauxii

Binomial name
- Myomyscus verreauxii (Smith, 1834)

Synonyms
- Myomys verreauxii (Smith, 1834)

= Verreaux's mouse =

Species of rodent

Verreaux's mouse or Verreaux's white-footed rat (Myomyscus verreauxii) is a species of rodent in the family Muridae. It is the only species in the genus Myomyscus. Other species that had been previously assigned to Myomyscus are now considered to belong to the genera Mastomys, Ochromyscus, Praomys and Stenocephalemys.

It is found only in South Africa. Its natural habitats are temperate forests and Mediterranean-type shrubby vegetation.
