= Prostitution in Yemen =

Prostitution in Yemen is illegal and punishable by penalty from 3 years of prison to even death penalty but common especially in Aden and in the capital, Sana'a. UNAIDS estimate there are 54,000 prostitutes in the country. Many of these women have turned to prostitution because of poverty. Many are Ethiopian and Somali refugees. Somali women frequently travel to Yemen and end up as prostitutes.

Much prostitution takes place in hotels in Sana’a. Some hotels have "house prostitutes" and it is possible to book a room and a woman to be ready on arrival.

Many sex tourists from other Gulf states, particularly Saudis and Emiratis, indulge in what are known as "tourist marriages". These are authorised by some Islamic authorities as “misyar” marriages.

Sex trafficking and child prostitution are problems in the country.

== History ==
Historically, prostitution in Yemen was connected to slavery in Yemen. Female slaves were primarily enslaved as harem concubines (sex slaves) or as domestic house slaves. The female slaves owned by women could be used for a number of domestic household chores, while women owned by men were exploited sexually, and used as both sex slaves (concubines) as well as entertainers.

In the early middle ages, there were also a minority of slave girls who were trained to become qiyan artist courtesans or slave singing girls. This custom was still ongoing in the 12th century, when the female slave artists performed in public in front of a male audience, and were prostituted by way of frequently being sold from one male client to the next, each one having intercourse with her before selling her on.

Slavery in Yemen was abolished in the 1960s, after which the old form of prostitution could no longer be legally practiced.

== Islamic activism ==
In 2009, the Yemeni religious police led a crackdown against Chinese-organised prostitution in Sana'a. The workers at many massage parlors, spas and restaurants were dragged out into the streets, and the establishments were closed down. It was alleged that corruption had allowed the establishments to operate up to that time. The police were pressured into action by the "Virtue and Vice Committee" which was led by cleric Abdul Majeed al-Zindani. Zindani, who was designated as a terrorist by the United States in 2004, had previously issued a fatwa sanctioning the demolition of the house of a man suspected of running a prostitution ring.

In January 2012, armed Islamists attacked a hotel in Aden which they suspected of being used for prostitution. More than 10 gunmen opened fire on the Layali Dubai (Dubai Nights) hotel before setting fire to it. Two people were killed and 13 injured.

== Sex trafficking ==
Yemen is a country of origin and, to a lesser extent, transit and destination, for women and children subjected to sex trafficking. The ongoing conflict, lack of rule of law, and the deteriorating economy have likely disrupted some trafficking patterns and exacerbated others. Traffickers, security officials, and employers forced some Yemeni children into sex trafficking in Saudi Arabia. Prior to the conflict, Yemen was a transit point and destination for women and children, primarily from the Horn of Africa, who were subjected to sex trafficking. Ethiopians and Somalis travelled voluntarily to Yemen with the hope of employment in Gulf countries, but some women and children among this population may have been exploited in sex trafficking in Yemen. Others migrated based on fraudulent offers of employment as domestic workers in Yemen, where they were subsequently subjected to sex trafficking. Some female refugees were previously forced into prostitution in Aden and Lahij Governorates. The UN estimated that the protracted Syrian conflict resulted in an influx of as many as 100,000 Syrian refugees to Yemen; Syrian refugee women and children begging in the streets were highly vulnerable to sex trafficking in the country.

Yemeni children have been subjected to sex trafficking within the country and in Saudi Arabia. Girls as young as 15 years old have reportedly been exploited in commercial sex in hotels and clubs in the Governorates of Sana’a, Aden, and Taiz. Prior to the conflict, most child sex tourists in Yemen were from Saudi Arabia, with a smaller percentage originating from other Gulf nations, including the United Arab Emirates.

The United States Department of State Office to Monitor and Combat Trafficking in Persons ranks Yemen as a 'Special case' country.
