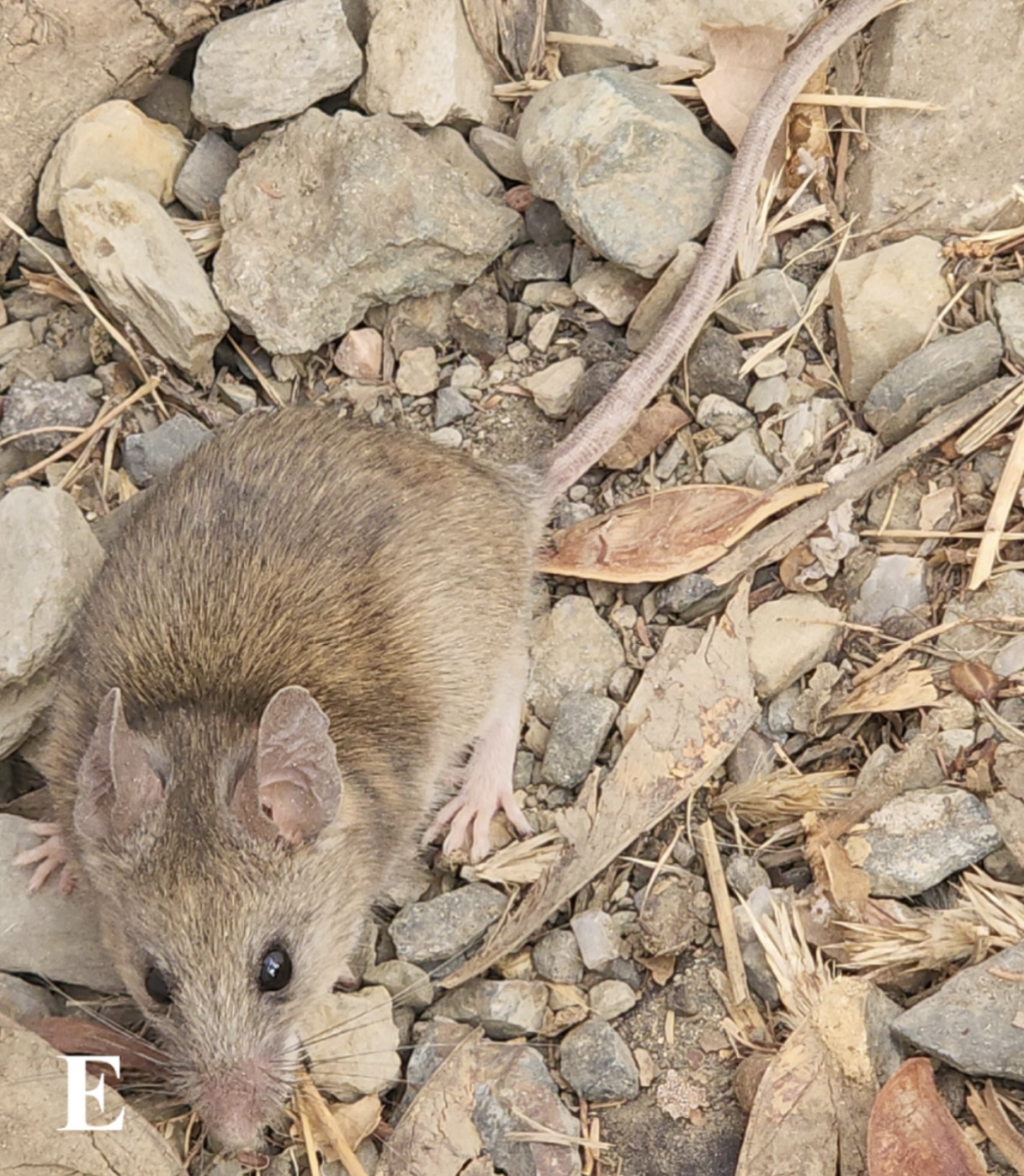

Conservation status
- Data Deficient (IUCN 3.1)

Scientific classification
- Kingdom: Animalia
- Phylum: Chordata
- Class: Mammalia
- Infraclass: Placentalia
- Order: Rodentia
- Family: Muridae
- Genus: Ochromyscus
- Species: O. yemeni

Binomial name
- Ochromyscus yemeni (Sanborn & Hoogstraal, 1953)

Synonyms
- Myomyscus yemeni Sanborn & Hoogstraal, 1953; Myomys fumatus yemeni Sanborn & Hoogstraal, 1953

= Yemeni mouse =

Species of rodent

The Yemeni mouse (Ochromyscus yemeni) is a species of rodent in the family Muridae. It is found in Saudi Arabia and Yemen. It is the only modern member of the tribe Praomyini to be found outside of Africa.

It was initially described as a subspecies of Myomys fumatus in its 1953 description by Colin Campbell Sanborn and Harry Hoogstraal.

Some parasites found on this species include the mite Laelaps nuttalli. and the flea Xenopsylla cheopis.
