= Arabian shrew =

Conservation status
- Least Concern (IUCN 3.1)

Scientific classification
- Kingdom: Animalia
- Phylum: Chordata
- Class: Mammalia
- Order: Eulipotyphla
- Family: Soricidae
- Genus: Crocidura
- Species: C. arabica

Binomial name
- Crocidura arabica Hutterer & Harrison, 1988
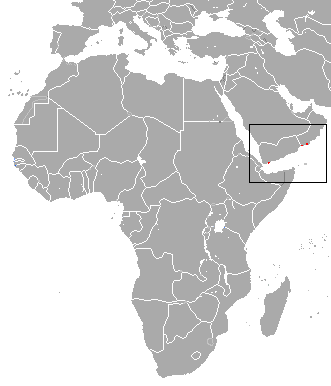
- Arabian shrew range

Species of mammal

The Arabian shrew (Crocidura arabica) is a species of mammal in the family Soricidae. It is found in Oman and Yemen. They are solitary carnivores.
