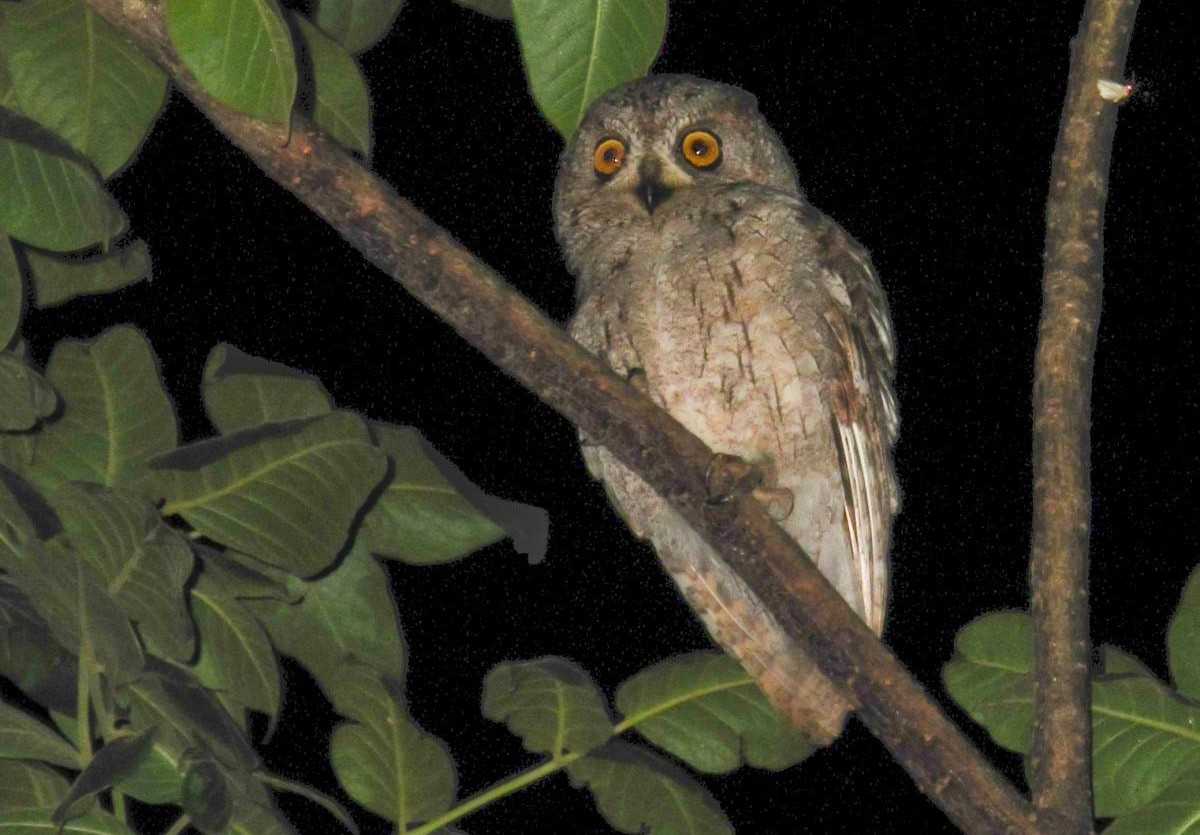

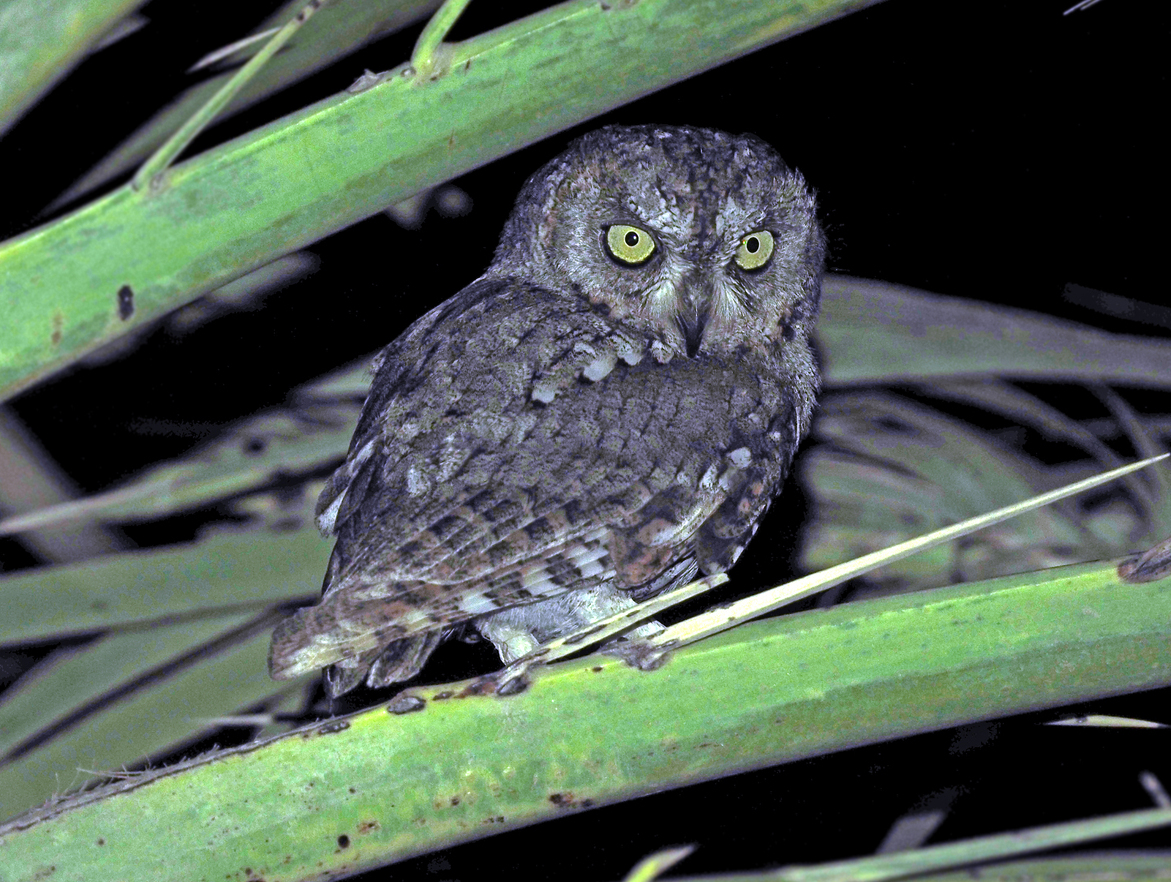

Conservation status
- Least Concern (IUCN 3.1)
- CITES Appendix II

Scientific classification
- Kingdom: Animalia
- Phylum: Chordata
- Class: Aves
- Order: Strigiformes
- Family: Strigidae
- Genus: Otus
- Species: O. socotranus

Binomial name
- Otus socotranus (Ogilvie-Grant & Forbes, 1899)

= Socotra scops owl =

Species of owl

The Socotra scops owl (Otus socotranus) is a small owl endemic to the island of Socotra, Yemen.

== Taxonomy ==
The Socotra scops owl was previously lumped with the African scops owl (Otus senegalensis), but differences in plumage and vocalisations have led to it being split to a separate species. Recent genetic research suggests that its closest relatives are the Oriental scops owl and the Seychelles scops owl (Otus insularis). An interesting theory this research has led to is that the oriental scops owl is a taxon that evolved from a colonisation of the continent from island ancestors, an event which had previously been thought unlikely because island taxa were thought to be less competitive than related continental taxa.

== Description ==
A very small scops owl which is heavily streaked and barred on its pale sandy-grey upperparts, paler underparts with darker shaft streaks and fine, dark barring. The plain facial disc has vague margins and the shoulder stripe is not as conspicuous as in other scops owls and are sandy-coloured. The ear-tufts are very small and the eyes are yellow. Its length is 15–16 cm (5.9–6.3 in).

=== Voice ===
The song of the Socotra scops owl is a repeated, low-pitched series of notes which is similar to that described for the oriental scops owl (Otus sunia).

== Distribution and habitat ==
The Socotra scops owl is endemic to the Indian Ocean island of Socotra off the Horn of Africa, which is within the territory of Yemen. On Socotra it is found on over 45% of the island, most numerous in areas where there are mature palms. Its preferred habitat is rocky semi-desert with scattered trees and bushes.

== Behaviour ==
Very little is known about the behaviour of the Socotra scops owl. It probably mainly feeds on insects and small vertebrates; the stomach contents of a single specimen contained a grasshopper, a centipede and two lizards. It has also been observed hawking for moths at dusk, in a similar fashion to a nightjar. Very little is known about its breeding behaviour but a female with enlarged ovaries was caught in April. It probably uses natural cavities for nesting. Two 20-day-old young have been recorded on the nest in February, their age suggesting that the eggs were laid in early January.
