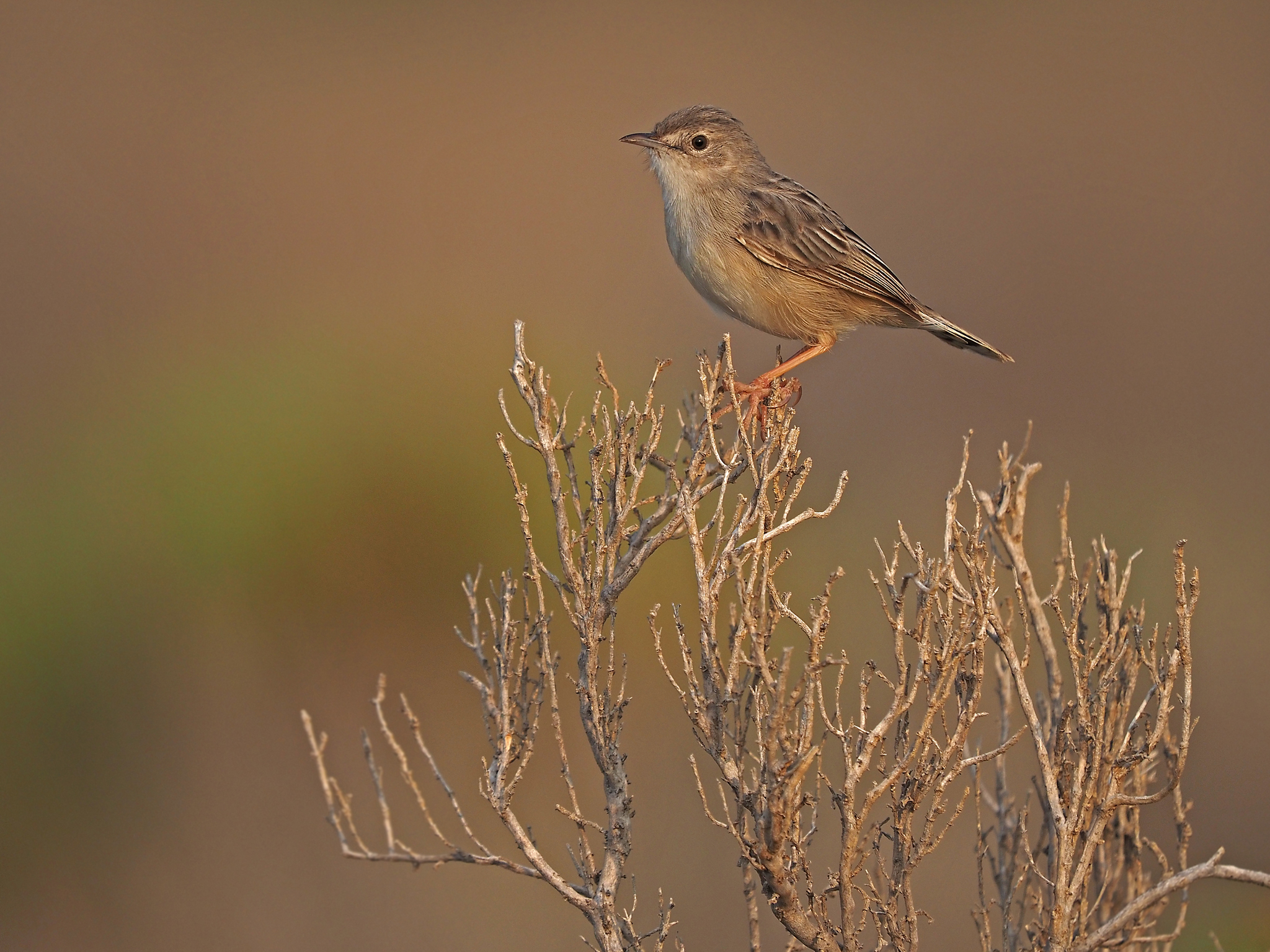

Conservation status
- Least Concern (IUCN 3.1)

Scientific classification
- Kingdom: Animalia
- Phylum: Chordata
- Class: Aves
- Order: Passeriformes
- Family: Cisticolidae
- Genus: Cisticola
- Species: C. haesitatus

Binomial name
- Cisticola haesitatus (PL Sclater & Hartlaub, 1881)

= Socotra cisticola =

Species of bird

The Socotra cisticola (Cisticola haesitatus) or island cisticola is a species of bird in the family Cisticolidae. It is endemic to Socotra Island in the Arabian Sea.

Its natural habitats are subtropical or tropical dry shrubland and subtropical or tropical high-altitude grassland. It is threatened by habitat loss.
