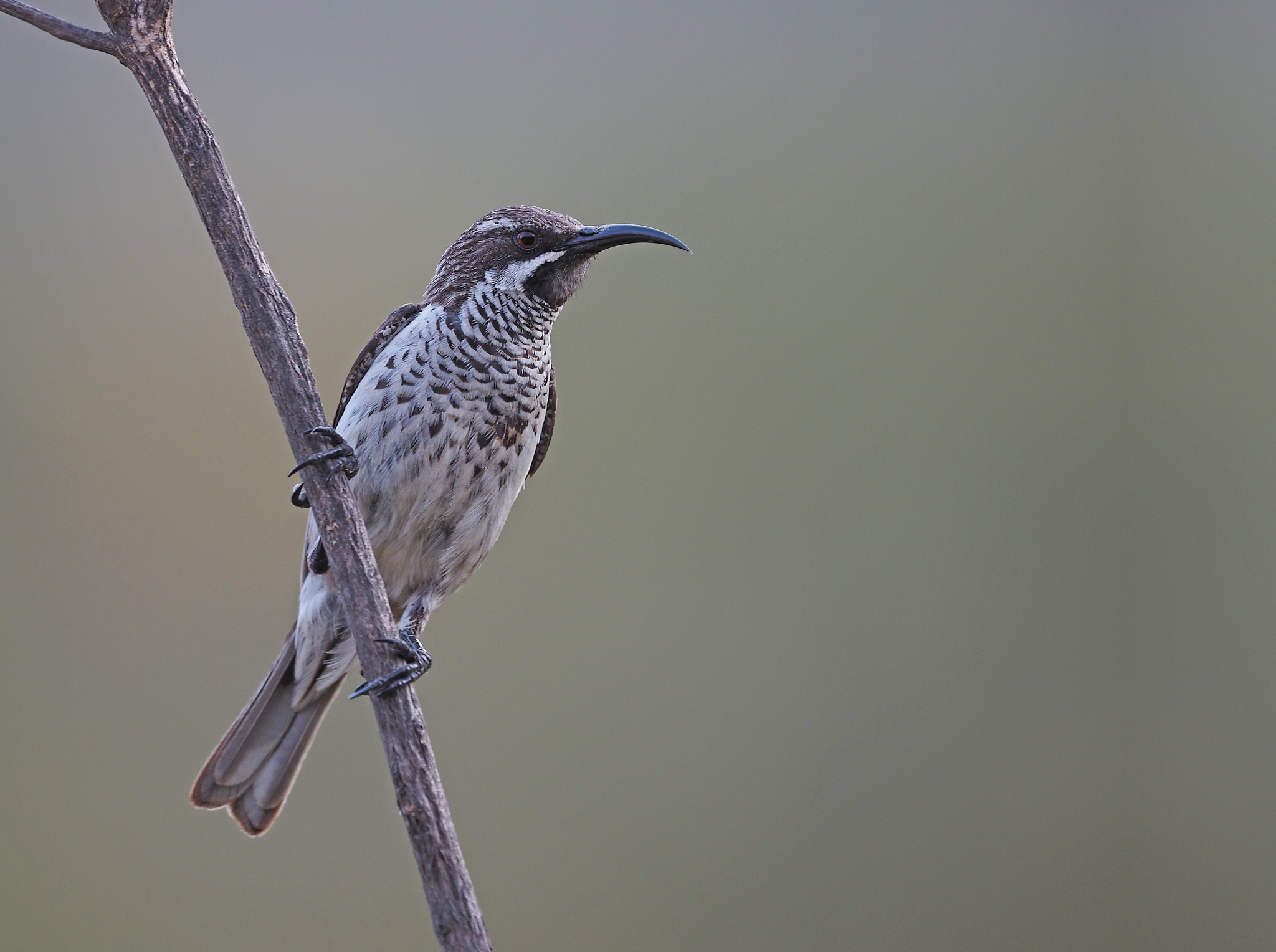

Conservation status
- Least Concern (IUCN 3.1)

Scientific classification
- Kingdom: Animalia
- Phylum: Chordata
- Class: Aves
- Order: Passeriformes
- Family: Nectariniidae
- Genus: Chalcomitra
- Species: C. balfouri

Binomial name
- Chalcomitra balfouri (Sclater, PL & Hartlaub, 1881)

Synonyms
- Nectarinia balfouri

= Socotra sunbird =

Species of bird

The Socotra sunbird (Chalcomitra balfouri) is a species of bird in the family Nectariniidae. It is endemic to Socotra.

Its natural habitats are tropical dry shrubland, tropical moist shrubland, and tropical high-altitude shrubland. It is threatened by habitat loss.
