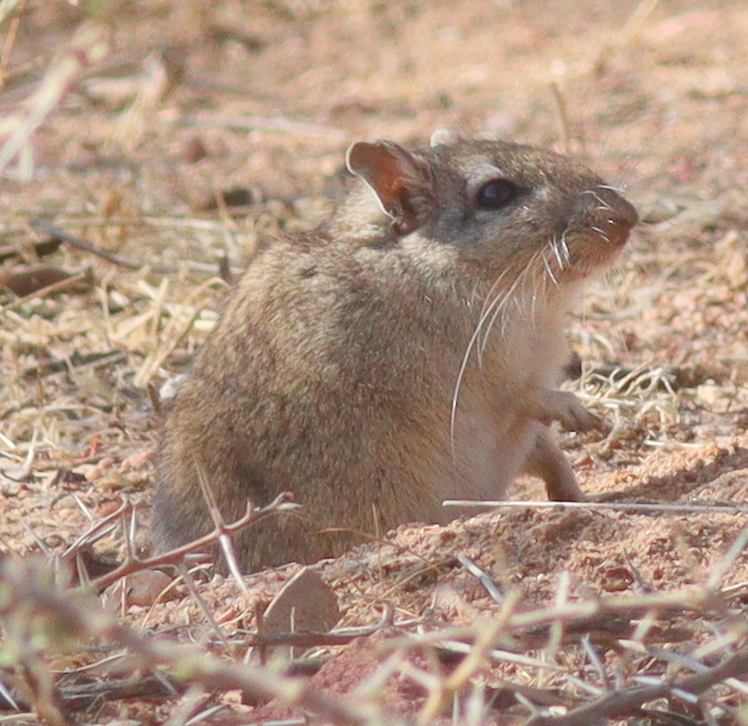

Conservation status
- Least Concern (IUCN 3.1)

Scientific classification
- Kingdom: Animalia
- Phylum: Chordata
- Class: Mammalia
- Order: Rodentia
- Family: Muridae
- Genus: Meriones
- Species: M. rex

Binomial name
- Meriones rex Yerbury & Thomas, 1895

= King jird =

Species of rodent

The king jird (Meriones rex) is a species of rodent in the family Muridae. It is found in Saudi Arabia and Yemen.
