= List of World Heritage Sites in Panama =

Location of World Heritage Sites in Panama

The United Nations Educational, Scientific and Cultural Organization (UNESCO) World Heritage Sites are places of importance to cultural or natural heritage as described in the UNESCO World Heritage Convention, established in 1972. Cultural heritage consists of monuments (such as architectural works, monumental sculptures, or inscriptions), groups of buildings, and sites (including archaeological sites). Natural features (consisting of physical and biological formations), geological and physiographical formations (including habitats of threatened species of animals and plants), and natural sites which are important from the point of view of science, conservation, or natural beauty, are defined as natural heritage. Panama accepted the convention on 3 March 1978. It has five World Heritage Sites, with a further one on the tentative list.

The first site in Panama added to the list was the Fortifications on the Caribbean Side of Panama: Portobelo-San Lorenzo, in 1980. This site has been listed as endangered since 2012 because of environmental factors, lack of maintenance, and uncontrollable urban developments. Three sites are listed for their cultural significance and three for natural significance. The Talamanca Range-La Amistad Reserves / La Amistad National Park is shared with Costa Rica. Panama has served as a member of the World Heritage Committee from 1978 to 1985. The most recent site listed was The Colonial Transisthmian Route of Panamá, in 2025, as an extension of the site Archaeological Site of Panamá Viejo and Historic District of Panamá, which was originally listed in 1997.

== World Heritage Sites ==
UNESCO lists sites under ten criteria; each entry must meet at least one of the criteria. Criteria i through vi are cultural, and vii through x are natural.

* Transnational site
† In danger

World Heritage Sites
Site	Image	Location (province)	Year listed	UNESCO data	Description
Fortifications on the Caribbean Side of Panama: Portobelo-San Lorenzo†	Ruins of a fortress near the shore, view from above	Colón	1980	135; i, iv (cultural)	The two fortresses on the Caribbean coast of Panama, Portobelo and San Lorenzo, were constructed by the Spanish at the end of the 16th century to protect the trade routes. They were rebuilt and renovated several times and represent the development of Spanish military architecture in a tropical setting. Several forts, batteries, and strongholds have been preserved. San Lorenzo is pictured. The site has been listed as endangered since 2012 because of environmental factors, lack of maintenance, and uncontrollable urban developments.
Darién National Park	A collared aracari bird	Darién	1981	159; vii, ix, x (natural)	The Darién Gap is the meeting point between the previously separated North and South American landmasses and, in turn, also the meeting point between their flora and fauna. Together with the diverse geography, with tropical lowland rainforests, several mountain ranges, mangroves, swamps, and coasts, this makes the region remarkably rich in biodiversity. The national park covers 579,000 hectares (1,430,000 acres). Several endangered or vulnerable species live here, including the brown-headed spider monkey, harpy eagle, Baird's tapir, and giant anteater. A collared aracari from the park is pictured.
Talamanca Range-La Amistad Reserves / La Amistad National Park*	Tropical rainforest scenery	Bocas del Toro, Chiriquí	1990	205bis; vii, viii, ix, x (natural)	Being located at the meeting point between the North and South American flora and fauna, the area is rich in biodiversity, with about 10,000 flowering plants, over 200 species of mammals, about 600 species of birds, and 250 species of reptiles and amphibians. Most of the land is covered by tropical rainforests, however there are also several mountains reaching above 3,000 metres (9,800 ft). The glacial activity during the Quaternary glaciation shaped the landscape by creating cirques, valleys, and glacial lakes. The Costa Rican part of the site was initially listed independently in 1983, the part in Panama was added in 1990. The combined property covers 570,045 hectares (1,408,610 acres).
Coiba National Park and its Special Zone of Marine Protection	A small tropical island with palms	Veraguas, Chiriquí	2005	1138rev; ix, x (natural)	Located off the coast of Panama, several animal and plant species on Coiba and surrounding smaller islands have evolved to look different than their counterparts on the mainland. The area is a refuge for species that have disappeared from the rest of Panama, such as the crested eagle and scarlet macaw. The waters are important for resident and migratory whale, shark, sea turtle, and pelagic fish species.
The Colonial Transisthmian Route of Panamá	Camino Real close the shore of Alajuela Lake	Panamá, Colón	2025	1582rev; ii, iv (cultural)	This nomination comprises six properties, of which the sites of the Panamá City and the fortifications of Portobelo (pictured) and San Lorenzo are already listed as World Heritage Sites. The other components are the Cruces Road (two sections) and the Royal Road. They constituted parts of the roads built by the Spanish to connect the Atlantic and the Pacific oceans between the 16th and 19th centuries.

== Tentative list ==
In addition to sites inscribed on the World Heritage List, member states can maintain a list of tentative sites that they may consider for nomination. Nominations for the World Heritage List are only accepted if the site was previously listed on the tentative list. Panama has one property on its tentative list.

Tentative sites
Site	Image	Location (province)	Year listed	UNESCO criteria	Description
Archaeological Site and Historic Centre of Panamá City	Ruins with trees in the background	Panamá	2015	ii, iv (cultural)	This nomination is a proposed boundary and name modification of the site Archaeological Site of Panamá Viejo and Historic District of Panamá which was listed in 1997. The ruins of the Casa de los Genoveses in Panamá Viejo is pictured.
