= List of World Heritage Sites by year of inscription =

The United Nations Educational, Scientific and Cultural Organization (UNESCO) designates World Heritage Sites of outstanding universal value to cultural or natural heritage which have been nominated by countries which are signatories to the UNESCO World Heritage Convention, established in 1972. Cultural heritage consists of monuments (such as architectural works, monumental sculptures, or inscriptions), groups of buildings, and sites (including archaeological sites). Natural features (consisting of physical and biological formations), geological and physiographical formations (including habitats of threatened species of animals and plants), and natural sites which are important from the point of view of science, conservation or natural beauty, are defined as natural heritage. To make a country's historical sites eligible for designation as a World Heritage Sites, the country needs to sign the World Heritage Convention. World Heritage Sites are selected during the annual sessions of the World Heritage Committee. The first World Heritage Site in the list is the Galápagos Islands. The 24th session in 2000 inscribed the most with 61 entries, while the 13th session in 1989 only inscribed seven sites.

== 1978 (1st list - 2nd session) ==
(F) denotes the first site given World Heritage Status from its respective country

12 sites (8 cultural, 4 natural)
Host: United States

Country	Site	Category	UNESCO Reference no.
Canada	L'Anse aux Meadows National Historic Site (F)	Cultural	4
Canada	Nahanni National Park	Natural	24
Ecuador	City of Quito	Cultural	2
Ecuador	Galápagos Islands (F)	Natural	1
Ethiopia	Rock-Hewn Churches, Lalibela	Cultural	18
Ethiopia	Simien National Park (F)	Natural	9
(West Germany); Germany	Aachen Cathedral (F)	Cultural	3
Poland	Historic Centre of Kraków (F)	Cultural	29
Poland	Wieliczka and Bochnia Royal Salt Mines	Cultural	32
Senegal	Island of Gorée (F)	Cultural	26
United States	Mesa Verde National Park	Cultural	27
United States	Yellowstone National Park (F)	Natural	28

== 1979 (3rd session) ==
45 sites (34 cultural, 8 natural, 3 mixed)
Host: Egypt

Country	Site	Category	UNESCO Reference no.
Albania (Yugoslavia); SR Macedonia (F)	Natural and Cultural Heritage of the Ohrid Region	Mixed	99
Belarus; Poland	Białowieża Forest	Natural	33
Bulgaria	Boyana Church (F)	Cultural	42
Bulgaria	Madara Rider	Cultural	43
Bulgaria	Rock-Hewn Churches of Ivanovo	Cultural	45
Bulgaria	Thracian Tomb of Kazanlak	Cultural	44
Canada	Dinosaur Provincial Park	Natural	71
Canada; United States	Kluane / Wrangell–St. Elias / Glacier Bay / Tatshenshini-Alsek	Natural	72
(Yugoslavia); SR Croatia	Historical Complex of Split with the Palace of Diocletian	Cultural	97
(Yugoslavia); SR Croatia	Old City of Dubrovnik (F)	Cultural	95
(Yugoslavia); SR Croatia	Plitvice Lakes National Park	Natural	98
(Zaire); DR Congo	Virunga National Park (F)	Natural	63
Egypt	Abu Mena	Cultural	90
Egypt	Ancient Thebes with its Necropolis (F)	Cultural	87
Egypt	Historic Cairo	Cultural	89
Egypt	Memphis and its Necropolis – the Pyramid Fields from Giza to Dahshur	Cultural	86
Egypt	Nubian Monuments from Abu Simbel to Philae	Cultural	88
Ethiopia	Fasil Ghebbi, Gondar Region	Cultural	19
France	Chartres Cathedral	Cultural	81
France	Mont-Saint-Michel and its Bay	Cultural	80
France	Palace and Park of Versailles (F)	Cultural	83
France	Prehistoric Sites and Decorated Caves of the Vézère Valley	Cultural	85
France	Vézelay, Church and Hill	Cultural	84
Ghana	Forts and Castles, Volta, Greater Accra, Central and Western Regions (F)	Cultural	34
Guatemala	Antigua Guatemala	Cultural	65
Guatemala	Tikal National Park (F)	Mixed	64
Iran	Meidan Eimam, Esfahan	Cultural	115
Iran	Persepolis	Cultural	114
Iran	Tchogha Zanbil (F)	Cultural	113
Italy	Rock Drawings in Valcamonica (F)	Cultural	94
(Yugoslavia); SR Montenegro	Natural and Culturo-Historical Region of Kotor (F)	Cultural	125
Nepal	Kathmandu Valley (F)	Cultural	121
Nepal	Sagarmatha National Park	Natural	120
Norway	Bryggen	Cultural	59
Norway	Urnes Stave Church (F)	Cultural	58
Poland	Auschwitz Birkenau German Nazi Concentration and Extermination Camp (1940–1945)	Cultural	31
(Yugoslavia); SR Serbia	Stari Ras and Sopoćani (F)	Cultural	96
Syria	Ancient City of Damascus (F)	Cultural	20
Tanzania	Ngorongoro Conservation Area (F)	Mixed	39
Tunisia	Amphitheatre of El Jem	Cultural	38
Tunisia	Archaeological Site of Carthage	Cultural	37
Tunisia	Medina of Tunis (F)	Cultural	36
United States	Everglades National Park	Natural	76
United States	Grand Canyon National Park	Natural	75
United States	Independence Hall	Cultural	78

== 1980 (4th session) ==
27 sites (22 cultural, 5 natural)
Host: France

Country	Site	Category	UNESCO Reference no.
Algeria	Al Qal'a of Beni Hammad (F)	Cultural	102
Brazil	Historic Town of Ouro Preto (F)	Cultural	124
Cyprus	Paphos (F)	Cultural	79
(Zaire); DR Congo	Garamba National Park	Natural	136
(Zaire); DR Congo	Kahuzi-Biega National Park	Natural	137
Ethiopia	Aksum	Cultural	15
Ethiopia	Lower Valley of the Awash	Cultural	10
Ethiopia	Lower Valley of the Omo	Cultural	17
Ethiopia	Tiya	Cultural	12
Ghana	Asante Traditional Buildings	Cultural	35
Holy See (F); Italy	Historic Centre of Rome, the Properties of the Holy See in that City Enjoying Extraterritorial Rights and San Paolo Fuori le Mura	Cultural	91
Honduras	Maya Site of Copan (F)	Cultural	129
Italy	Church and Dominican Convent of Santa Maria delle Grazie with 'The Last Supper' by Leonardo da Vinci	Cultural	93
Malta	City of Valletta (F)	Cultural	131
Malta	Ħal Saflieni Hypogeum	Cultural	130
Malta	Megalithic Temples of Malta	Cultural	132
(Yugoslavia); SR Montenegro	Durmitor National Park	Natural	100
Norway	Røros Mining Town and the Circumference	Cultural	55
Pakistan	Archaeological Ruins at Moenjodaro (F)	Cultural	138
Pakistan	Buddhist Ruins of Takht-i-Bahi and Neighbouring City Remains at Sahr-i-Bahlol	Cultural	140
Pakistan	Taxila	Cultural	139
Panama	Fortifications on the Caribbean Side of Panama: Portobelo-San Lorenzo (F)	Cultural	135
Poland	Historic Centre of Warsaw	Cultural	30
Syria	Ancient City of Bosra	Cultural	22
Syria	Site of Palmyra	Cultural	23
Tunisia	Ichkeul National Park	Natural	8
United States	Redwood National and State Parks	Natural	134

== 1981 (5th session) ==
26 sites (15 cultural, 9 natural, 2 mixed)
Host: Australia

Country	Site	Category	UNESCO Reference no.
Argentina	Los Glaciares National Park (F)	Natural	145
Australia	Great Barrier Reef (F)	Natural	154
Australia	Kakadu National Park	Mixed	147
Australia	Willandra Lakes Region	Mixed	167
Canada	Head-Smashed-In Buffalo Jump	Cultural	158
Canada	SG̱ang Gwaay	Cultural	157
Côte d'Ivoire; Guinea	Mount Nimba Strict Nature Reserve (F)	Natural	155
France	Amiens Cathedral	Cultural	162
France	Arles, Roman and Romanesque Monuments	Cultural	164
France	Cistercian Abbey of Fontenay	Cultural	165
France	Palace and Park of Fontainebleau	Cultural	160
France	Roman Theatre and its Surroundings and the 'Triumphal Arch' of Orange	Cultural	163
(West Germany); Germany	Speyer Cathedral	Cultural	168
(West Germany); Germany	Würzburg Residence with the Court Gardens and Residence Square	Cultural	169
Guatemala	Archaeological Park and Ruins of Quirigua	Cultural	149
Jerusalem	Old City of Jerusalem and its Walls (F)	Cultural	148
Morocco	Medina of Fez (F)	Cultural	170
Pakistan	Fort and Shalamar Gardens in Lahore	Cultural	171
Pakistan	Historical Monuments at Makli, Thatta	Cultural	143
Panama	Darien National Park	Natural	159
Senegal	Djoudj National Bird Sanctuary	Natural	25
Senegal	Niokolo-Koba National Park	Natural	153
Tanzania	Ruins of Kilwa Kisiwani and Ruins of Songo Mnara	Cultural	144
Tanzania	Serengeti National Park	Natural	156
United States	Mammoth Cave National Park	Natural	150
United States	Olympic National Park	Natural	151

== 1982 (6th session) ==
24 sites (17 cultural, 5 natural, 2 mixed)
Host: France

Country	Site	Category	UNESCO Reference no.
Algeria	Djémila	Cultural	191
Algeria	M'Zab Valley	Cultural	188
Algeria	Tassili n'Ajjer	Mixed	179
Algeria	Timgad	Cultural	194
Algeria	Tipasa	Cultural	193
Australia	Lord Howe Island Group	Natural	186
Australia	Tasmanian Wilderness	Mixed	181
Brazil	Historic Centre of the Town of Olinda	Cultural	189
Côte d'Ivoire	Taï National Park	Natural	195
Cuba	Old Havana and its Fortification System (F)	Cultural	204
France	From the Great Saltworks of Salins-les-Bains to the Royal Saltworks of Arc-et-Senans, the Production of Open-pan Salt	Cultural	203
Haiti	National History Park – Citadel, Sans Souci, Ramiers (F)	Cultural	180
Honduras	Río Plátano Biosphere Reserve	Natural	196
Italy	Historic Centre of Florence	Cultural	174
Libya	Archaeological Site of Cyrene	Cultural	190
Libya	Archaeological Site of Leptis Magna (F)	Cultural	183
Libya	Archaeological Site of Sabratha	Cultural	184
Seychelles	Aldabra Atoll (F)	Natural	185
Sri Lanka	Ancient City of Polonnaruwa (F)	Cultural	201
Sri Lanka	Ancient City of Sigiriya	Cultural	202
Sri Lanka	Sacred City of Anuradhapura	Cultural	200
Tanzania	Selous Game Reserve	Natural	199
United States	Cahokia Mounds State Historic Site	Cultural	198
(South Yemen); Yemen	Old Walled City of Shibam (F)	Cultural	192

== 1983 (7th session) ==
29 sites (19 cultural, 9 natural, 1 mixed)
Host: Italy

Country	Site	Category	UNESCO Reference no.
Argentina; Brazil	Jesuit Missions of the Guaranis: San Ignacio Mini, Santa Ana, Nuestra Señora de Loreto and Santa Maria Mayor (Argentina), Ruins of São Miguel das Missões (Brazil)	Cultural	275
Bulgaria	Ancient City of Nessebar	Cultural	217
Bulgaria	Pirin National Park	Natural	225
Bulgaria	Rila Monastery	Cultural	216
Bulgaria	Srebarna Nature Reserve	Natural	219
Canada	Wood Buffalo National Park	Natural	256
Costa Rica (F); Panama	Talamanca Range–La Amistad Reserves / La Amistad National Park	Natural	205
Côte d'Ivoire	Comoé National Park	Natural	227
Ecuador	Sangay National Park	Natural	260
France	Abbey Church of Saint-Savin sur Gartempe	Cultural	230
France	Gulf of Porto: Calanche of Piana, Gulf of Girolata, Scandola Reserve	Natural	258
France	Place Stanislas, Place de la Carrière and Place d'Alliance in Nancy	Cultural	229
(West Germany); Germany	Wieskirche	Cultural	271
India	Agra Fort	Cultural	251
India	Ajanta Caves (F)	Cultural	242
India	Ellora Caves	Cultural	243
India	Taj Mahal	Cultural	252
Peru	City of Cuzco	Cultural	273
Peru	Historic Sanctuary of Machu Picchu (F)	Mixed	274
Portugal	Central Zone of the Town of Angra do Heroismo in the Azores	Cultural	206
Portugal	Convent of Christ in Tomar	Cultural	265
Portugal	Monastery of Batalha	Cultural	264
Portugal	Monastery of the Hieronymites and Tower of Belém in Lisbon (F)	Cultural	263
Seychelles	Vallée de Mai Nature Reserve	Natural	261
Switzerland	Abbey of St Gall (F)	Cultural	268
Switzerland	Benedictine Convent of St John at Müstair	Cultural	269
Switzerland	Old City of Berne	Cultural	267
United States	Great Smoky Mountains National Park	Natural	259
United States (Puerto Rico) (F)	La Fortaleza and San Juan National Historic Site in Puerto Rico	Cultural	266

== 1984 (8th session) ==
22 sites (15 cultural, 7 natural)
Host: Argentina

Country	Site	Category	UNESCO Reference no.
Argentina	Iguazu National Park	Natural	303
Canada	Canadian Rocky Mountain Parks	Natural	304
Colombia	Port, Fortresses and Group of Monuments, Cartagena (F)	Cultural	285
(Zaire); DR Congo	Salonga National Park	Natural	280
(West Germany); Germany	Castles of Augustusburg and Falkenlust at Brühl	Cultural	288
Holy See	Vatican City	Cultural	286
India	Group of Monuments at Mahabalipuram	Cultural	249
India	Sun Temple, Konârak	Cultural	246
Lebanon	Anjar	Cultural	293
Lebanon	Baalbek	Cultural	294
Lebanon	Byblos	Cultural	295
Lebanon	Tyre (F)	Cultural	299
Malawi	Lake Malawi National Park (F)	Natural	289
Nepal	Chitwan National Park	Natural	284
Spain	Alhambra, Generalife and Albayzín, Granada	Cultural	314
Spain	Burgos Cathedral (F)	Cultural	316
Spain	Historic Centre of Cordoba	Cultural	313
Spain	Monastery and Site of the Escurial, Madrid	Cultural	318
Spain	Works of Antoni Gaudí	Cultural	320
United States	Statue of Liberty	Cultural	307
United States	Yosemite National Park	Natural	308
Zimbabwe	Mana Pools National Park, Sapi and Chewore Safari Areas (F)	Natural	302

== 1985 (9th session) ==
30 sites (25 cultural, 4 natural, 1 mixed)
Host: France

Country	Site	Category	UNESCO Reference no.
Bangladesh	Historic Mosque City of Bagerhat	Cultural	321
Bangladesh	Ruins of the Buddhist Vihara at Paharpur (F)	Cultural	322
Benin	Royal Palaces of Abomey (F)	Cultural	323
Brazil	Historic Centre of Salvador de Bahia	Cultural	309
Brazil	Sanctuary of Bom Jesus do Congonhas	Cultural	334
Bulgaria	Thracian Tomb of Sveshtari	Cultural	359
Canada	Historic District of Old Québec	Cultural	300
Cyprus	Painted Churches in the Troodos Region	Cultural	351
France	Pont du Gard (Roman Aqueduct)	Cultural	344
(West Germany); Germany	St Mary's Cathedral and St Michael's Church at Hildesheim	Cultural	187
India	Kaziranga National Park	Natural	337
India	Keoladeo National Park	Natural	340
India	Manas Wildlife Sanctuary	Natural	338
Iraq	Hatra (F)	Cultural	277
Jordan	Petra (F)	Cultural	326
Jordan	Quseir Amra	Cultural	327
Libya	Rock-Art Sites of Tadrart Acacus	Cultural	287
Morocco	Medina of Marrakesh	Cultural	331
Norway	Rock Art of Alta	Cultural	352
Peru	Chavín (Archaeological Site)	Cultural	330
Peru	Huascarán National Park	Natural	333
Spain	Cave of Altamira and Paleolithic Cave Art of Northern Spain	Cultural	310
Spain	Monuments of Oviedo and the Kingdom of the Asturias	Cultural	312
Spain	Old Town of Ávila with its Extra-Muros Churches	Cultural	348
Spain	Old Town of Segovia and its Aqueduct	Cultural	311
Spain	Santiago de Compostela (Old Town)	Cultural	347
Tunisia	Punic Town of Kerkuane and its Necropolis	Cultural	332
Turkey	Göreme National Park and the Rock Sites of Cappadocia	Mixed	357
Turkey	Great Mosque and Hospital of Divriği	Cultural	358
Turkey	Historic Areas of Istanbul (F)	Cultural	356

== 1986 (10th session) ==
29 sites (23 cultural, 5 natural, 1 mixed)
Host: France

Country	Site	Category	UNESCO Reference no.
Australia	Gondwana Rainforests of Australia	Natural	368
Brazil	Iguaçu National Park	Natural	355
(West Germany); Germany	Roman Monuments, Cathedral of St Peter and Church of Our Lady in Trier	Cultural	367
Greece	Temple of Apollo Epicurius at Bassae (F)	Cultural	392
India	Churches and Convents of Goa	Cultural	234
India	Fatehpur Sikri	Cultural	255
India	Group of Monuments at Hampi	Cultural	241
India	Khajuraho Group of Monuments	Cultural	240
Libya	Old Town of Ghadamès	Cultural	362
Peru	Chan Chan Archaeological Zone	Cultural	366
Portugal	Historic Centre of Évora	Cultural	361
(Yugoslavia); SR Serbia	Studenica Monastery	Cultural	389
(Yugoslavia); SR Slovenia (F)	Škocjan Caves	Natural	390
Spain	Garajonay National Park	Natural	380
Spain	Historic City of Toledo	Cultural	379
Spain	Mudejar Architecture of Aragon	Cultural	378
Spain	Old Town of Cáceres	Cultural	384
Syria	Ancient City of Aleppo	Cultural	21
Turkey	Hattusha: the Hittite Capital	Cultural	377
United Kingdom	Castles and Town Walls of King Edward in Gwynedd	Cultural	374
United Kingdom	Durham Castle and Cathedral	Cultural	370
United Kingdom	Giant's Causeway and Causeway Coast (F)	Natural	369
United Kingdom	Ironbridge Gorge	Cultural	371
United Kingdom	St Kilda	Mixed	387
United Kingdom	Stonehenge, Avebury and Associated Sites	Cultural	373
United Kingdom	Studley Royal Park including the Ruins of Fountains Abbey	Cultural	372
(North Yemen); Yemen	Old City of Sanaa	Cultural	385
Zimbabwe	Great Zimbabwe National Monument	Cultural	364
Zimbabwe	Khami Ruins National Monument	Cultural	365

== 1987 (11th session) ==
41 sites (32 cultural, 7 natural, 2 mixed)
Host: France

Country	Site	Category	UNESCO Reference no.
Australia	Uluṟu-Kata Tjuṯa National Park	Mixed	447
Bolivia	City of Potosí (F)	Cultural	420
Brazil	Brasilia	Cultural	445
Cameroon	Dja Faunal Reserve (F)	Natural	407
Canada	Gros Morne National Park	Natural	419
China	Imperial Palaces of the Ming and Qing Dynasties in Beijing and Shenyang	Cultural	439
China	Mausoleum of the First Qin Emperor	Cultural	441
China	Mogao Caves	Cultural	440
China	Mount Taishan (F)	Mixed	437
China	Peking Man Site at Zhoukoudian	Cultural	449
China	The Great Wall	Cultural	438
(West Germany); Germany	Hanseatic City of Lübeck	Cultural	272
(West Germany); Germany; United Kingdom	Frontiers of the Roman Empire	Cultural	430
Greece	Acropolis, Athens	Cultural	404
Greece	Archaeological Site of Delphi	Cultural	393
Hungary	Budapest, including the Banks of the Danube, the Buda Castle Quarter and Andrássy Avenue (F)	Cultural	400
Hungary	Old Village of Hollókő and its Surroundings	Cultural	401
India	Elephanta Caves	Cultural	244
India	Great Living Chola Temples	Cultural	250
India	Group of Monuments at Pattadakal	Cultural	239
India	Sundarbans National Park	Natural	452
Italy	Piazza del Duomo, Pisa	Cultural	395
Italy	Venice and its Lagoon	Cultural	394
Mexico	Historic Centre of Mexico City and Xochimilco (F)	Cultural	412
Mexico	Historic Centre of Oaxaca and Archaeological Site of Monte Albán	Cultural	415
Mexico	Historic Centre of Puebla	Cultural	416
Mexico	Pre-Hispanic City and National Park of Palenque	Cultural	411
Mexico	Pre-Hispanic City of Teotihuacan	Cultural	414
Mexico	Sian Ka'an	Natural	410
Morocco	Ksar of Ait-Ben-Haddou	Cultural	444
Oman	Bahla Fort (F)	Cultural	433
Peru	Manú National Park	Natural	402
Spain	Cathedral, Alcázar and Archivo de Indias in Seville	Cultural	383
Tanzania	Kilimanjaro National Park	Natural	403
Turkey	Nemrut Dağ	Cultural	448
United Kingdom	Blenheim Palace	Cultural	425
United Kingdom	City of Bath	Cultural	428
United Kingdom	Palace of Westminster and Westminster Abbey including Saint Margaret's Church	Cultural	426
United States	Chaco Culture	Cultural	353
United States	Hawaii Volcanoes National Park	Natural	409
United States	Monticello and the University of Virginia in Charlottesville	Cultural	442

== 1988 (12th session) ==
27 sites (19 cultural, 5 natural, 3 mixed)
Host: Brazil

Country	Site	Category	UNESCO Reference no.
Australia	Wet Tropics of Queensland	Natural	486
Central African Republic	Manovo-Gounda St Floris National Park (F)	Natural	475
Cuba	Trinidad and the Valley de los Ingenios	Cultural	460
France	Strasbourg, Grande-Île and Neustadt	Cultural	495
Greece	Medieval City of Rhodes	Cultural	493
Greece	Meteora	Mixed	455
Greece	Mount Athos	Mixed	454
Greece	Paleochristian and Byzantine Monuments of Thessalonika	Cultural	456
Greece	Sanctuary of Asklepios at Epidaurus	Cultural	491
India	Nanda Devi and Valley of Flowers National Parks	Natural	335
Mali	Old Towns of Djenné (F)	Cultural	116
Mali	Timbuktu	Cultural	119
Mexico	Historic Town of Guanajuato and Adjacent Mines	Cultural	482
Mexico	Pre-Hispanic City of Chichen-Itza	Cultural	483
Oman	Archaeological Sites of Bat, Al-Khutm and Al-Ayn	Cultural	434
Peru	Historic Centre of Lima	Cultural	500
Spain	Old City of Salamanca	Cultural	381
Sri Lanka	Old Town of Galle and its Fortifications	Cultural	451
Sri Lanka	Sacred City of Kandy	Cultural	450
Sri Lanka	Sinharaja Forest Reserve	Natural	405
Tunisia	Kairouan	Cultural	499
Tunisia	Medina of Sousse	Cultural	498
Turkey	Hierapolis–Pamukkale	Mixed	485
Turkey	Xanthos–Letoon	Cultural	484
United Kingdom	Canterbury Cathedral, St Augustine's Abbey, and St Martin's Church	Cultural	496
United Kingdom	Tower of London	Cultural	488
United Kingdom (Pitcairn Islands) (F)	Henderson Island	Natural	487

== 1989 (13th session) ==
7 sites (4 cultural, 2 natural, 1 mixed)
Host: France

Country	Site	Category	UNESCO Reference no.
Greece	Archaeological Site of Mystras	Cultural	511
Greece	Archaeological Site of Olympia	Cultural	517
India	Buddhist Monuments at Sanchi	Cultural	524
Mali	Cliff of Bandiagara (Land of the Dogons)	Mixed	516
Mauritania	Banc d'Arguin National Park (F)	Natural	506
Portugal	Monastery of Alcobaça	Cultural	505
Zambia (F); Zimbabwe	Mosi-oa-Tunya / Victoria Falls	Natural	509

== 1990 (14th session) ==
16 sites (11 cultural, 2 natural, 3 mixed)
Host: Canada

Country	Site	Category	UNESCO Reference no.
Bolivia	Jesuit Missions of the Chiquitos	Cultural	529
China	Mount Huangshan	Mixed	547
Dominican Republic	Colonial City of Santo Domingo (F)	Cultural	526
Germany	Palaces and Parks of Potsdam and Berlin	Cultural	532
Greece	Delos	Cultural	530
Greece	Monasteries of Daphni, Hosios Loukas and Nea Moni of Chios	Cultural	537
Italy	Historic Centre of San Gimignano	Cultural	550
Madagascar	Andrefana Dry Forests (F)	Natural	494
New Zealand	Te Wahipounamu – South West New Zealand	Natural	551
New Zealand	Tongariro National Park (F)	Mixed	421
Peru	Río Abiseo National Park	Mixed	548
(Soviet Union); Russian Soviet Federative Socialist Republic	Historic Centre of Saint Petersburg and Related Groups of Monuments (F)	Cultural	540
(Soviet Union); Russian Soviet Federative Socialist Republic	Kizhi Pogost	Cultural	544
(Soviet Union); Russian Soviet Federative Socialist Republic	Kremlin and Red Square, Moscow	Cultural	545
(Soviet Union); Ukrainian Soviet Socialist Republic (F)	Kyiv: Saint-Sophia Cathedral and Related Monastic Buildings, Kyiv-Pechersk Lavra	Cultural	527
(Soviet Union); Uzbek Soviet Socialist Republic (F)	Itchan Kala	Cultural	543

== 1991 (15th session) ==
22 sites (16 cultural, 6 natural)
Host: Tunisia

Country	Site	Category	UNESCO Reference no.
Australia	Shark Bay, Western Australia	Natural	578
Bolivia	Historic City of Sucre	Cultural	566
Brazil	Serra da Capivara National Park	Cultural	606
Finland	Fortress of Suomenlinna	Cultural	583
Finland	Old Rauma (F)	Cultural	582
France	Cathedral of Notre-Dame, Former Abbey of Saint-Remi and Palace of Tau, Reims	Cultural	601
France	Paris, Banks of the Seine	Cultural	600
Germany	Abbey and Altenmünster of Lorsch	Cultural	515
Indonesia	Borobudur Temple Compounds	Cultural	592
Indonesia	Komodo National Park	Natural	609
Indonesia	Prambanan Temple Compounds	Cultural	642
Indonesia	Ujung Kulon National Park (F)	Natural	608
Mexico	Historic Centre of Morelia	Cultural	585
Mozambique	Island of Mozambique (F)	Cultural	599
Niger	Air and Ténéré Natural Reserves (F)	Natural	573
Romania	Danube Delta (F)	Natural	588
Spain	Poblet Monastery	Cultural	518
Sri Lanka	Rangiri Dambulla Cave Temple	Cultural	561
Sweden	Royal Domain of Drottningholm (F)	Cultural	559
Thailand	Historic City of Ayutthaya	Cultural	576
Thailand	Historic Town of Sukhothai and Associated Historic Towns (F)	Cultural	574
Thailand	Thungyai-Huai Kha Khaeng Wildlife Sanctuaries	Natural	591

== 1992 (16th session) ==
20 sites (16 cultural, 4 natural)
Host: United States

Country	Site	Category	UNESCO Reference no.
Albania	Butrint (F)	Cultural	570
Algeria	Kasbah of Algiers	Cultural	565
Australia	K'gari (Fraser Island)	Natural	630
Cambodia	Angkor (F)	Cultural	668
China	Huanglong Scenic and Historic Interest Area	Natural	638
China	Jiuzhaigou Valley Scenic and Historic Interest Area	Natural	637
China	Wulingyuan Scenic and Historic Interest Area	Natural	640
(Czechoslovakia); Czech Republic	Historic Centre of Český Krumlov	Cultural	617
(Czechoslovakia); Czech Republic	Historic Centre of Prague	Cultural	616
(Czechoslovakia); Czech Republic	Historic Centre of Telč (F)	Cultural	621
France	Bourges Cathedral	Cultural	635
Germany	Mines of Rammelsberg, Historic Town of Goslar and Upper Harz Water Management System	Cultural	623
Greece	Pythagoreion and Heraion of Samos	Cultural	595
Mexico	El Tajin, Pre-Hispanic City	Cultural	631
Poland	Old City of Zamość	Cultural	564
Russia	Cultural and Historic Ensemble of the Solovetsky Islands	Cultural	632
Russia	Historic Monuments of Novgorod and Surroundings	Cultural	604
Russia	White Monuments of Vladimir and Suzdal	Cultural	633
Thailand	Ban Chiang Archaeological Site	Cultural	575
United States	Taos Pueblo	Cultural	492

== 1993 (17th session) ==
33 sites (29 cultural, 4 natural)
Host: Colombia

Country	Site	Category	UNESCO Reference no.
El Salvador	Joya de Cerén Archaeological Site (F)	Cultural	675
Germany	Maulbronn Monastery Complex	Cultural	546
Germany	Town of Bamberg	Cultural	624
India	Humayun's Tomb, Delhi	Cultural	232
India	Qutb Minar and its Monuments, Delhi	Cultural	233
Ireland	Brú na Bóinne – Archaeological Ensemble of the Bend of the Boyne (F)	Cultural	659
Italy	The Sassi and the Park of the Rupestrian Churches of Matera	Cultural	670
Japan	Buddhist Monuments in the Horyu-ji Area	Cultural	660
Japan	Himeji-jo (F)	Cultural	661
Japan	Shirakami-Sanchi	Natural	663
Japan	Yakushima	Natural	662
Mexico	Historic Centre of Zacatecas	Cultural	676
Mexico	Rock Paintings of the Sierra de San Francisco	Cultural	714
Mexico	Whale Sanctuary of El Vizcaino	Natural	554
Paraguay	Jesuit Missions of La Santísima Trinidad de Paraná and Jesús de Tavarangue (F)	Cultural	648
Philippines	Baroque Churches of the Philippines (F)	Cultural	677
Philippines	Tubbataha Reefs Natural Park	Natural	653
Romania	Churches of Moldavia	Cultural	598
Romania	Monastery of Horezu	Cultural	597
Romania	Villages with Fortified Churches in Transylvania	Cultural	596
Russia	Architectural Ensemble of the Trinity Sergius Lavra in Sergiev Posad	Cultural	657
Slovakia	Historic Town of Banská Štiavnica and the Technical Monuments in its Vicinity	Cultural	618
Slovakia	Levoča, Spišský Hrad and the Associated Cultural Monuments	Cultural	620
Slovakia	Vlkolínec (F)	Cultural	622
Spain	Archaeological Ensemble of Mérida	Cultural	664
Spain	Routes of Santiago de Compostela: Camino Francés and Routes of Northern Spain	Cultural	669
Spain	Royal Monastery of Santa María de Guadalupe	Cultural	665
Sweden	Birka and Hovgården	Cultural	555
Sweden	Engelsberg Ironworks	Cultural	556
Uzbekistan	Historic Centre of Bukhara	Cultural	602
Venezuela	Coro and its Port (F)	Cultural	658
Vietnam	Complex of Hué Monuments (F)	Cultural	678
Yemen	Historic Town of Zabid	Cultural	611

== 1994 (18th session) ==
29 sites (21 cultural, 8 natural)
Host: Thailand

Country	Site	Category	UNESCO Reference no.
Australia	Australian Fossil Mammal Sites (Riversleigh / Naracoorte)	Natural	698
China	Ancient Building Complex in the Wudang Mountains	Cultural	705
China	Historic Ensemble of the Potala Palace, Lhasa	Cultural	707
China	Mountain Resort and its Outlying Temples, Chengde	Cultural	703
China	Temple and Cemetery of Confucius and the Kong Family Mansion in Qufu	Cultural	704
Colombia	Los Katíos National Park	Natural	711
Czech Republic	Pilgrimage Church of St John of Nepomuk at Zelená Hora	Cultural	690
Denmark	Jelling Mounds, Runic Stones and Church (F)	Cultural	697
Finland	Petäjävesi Old Church	Cultural	584
Georgia	Gelati Monastery (F)	Cultural	710
Georgia	Historical Monuments of Mtskheta	Cultural	708
Germany	Collegiate Church, Castle and Old Town of Quedlinburg	Cultural	535
Germany	Völklingen Ironworks	Cultural	687
Italy	City of Vicenza and the Palladian Villas of the Veneto	Cultural	712
Japan	Historic Monuments of Ancient Kyoto (Kyoto, Uji and Otsu Cities)	Cultural	688
Lithuania	Vilnius Historic Centre (F)	Cultural	541
Luxembourg	City of Luxembourg: its Old Quarters and Fortifications (F)	Cultural	699
Mexico	Earliest 16th-Century Monasteries on the Slopes of Popocatepetl	Cultural	702
Oman	Arabian Oryx Sanctuary (delisted in 2007)	Natural	654
Peru	Lines and Geoglyphs of Nasca and Palpa	Cultural	700
Russia	Church of the Ascension, Kolomenskoye	Cultural	634
Spain	Doñana National Park	Natural	685
Sweden	Rock Carvings in Tanum	Cultural	557
Sweden	Skogskyrkogården	Cultural	558
Turkey	City of Safranbolu	Cultural	614
Uganda	Bwindi Impenetrable National Park (F)	Natural	682
Uganda	Rwenzori Mountains National Park	Natural	684
Venezuela	Canaima National Park	Natural	701
Vietnam	Ha Long Bay - Cat Ba Archipelago	Natural	672

== 1995 (19th session) ==
29 sites (23 cultural, 6 natural)
Host: Germany

Country	Site	Category	UNESCO Reference no.
Canada	Old Town Lunenburg	Cultural	741
Canada; United States	Waterton Glacier International Peace Park	Natural	354
Chile	Rapa Nui National Park (F)	Cultural	715
Colombia	Historic Centre of Santa Cruz de Mompox	Cultural	742
Colombia	National Archeological Park of Tierradentro	Cultural	743
Colombia	San Agustín Archaeological Park	Cultural	744
Czech Republic	Kutná Hora: Historical Town Centre with the Church of St Barbara and the Cathedral of Our Lady at Sedlec	Cultural	732
Denmark	Roskilde Cathedral	Cultural	695
France	Historic Centre of Avignon: Papal Palace, Episcopal Ensemble and Avignon Bridge	Cultural	228
Germany	Messel Pit Fossil Site	Natural	720
Hungary; Slovakia	Caves of Aggtelek Karst and Slovak Karst	Natural	725
Italy	Crespi d'Adda	Cultural	730
Italy	Ferrara, City of the Renaissance, and its Po Delta	Cultural	733
Italy	Historic Centre of Naples	Cultural	726
Italy	Historic Centre of Siena	Cultural	717
Japan	Historic Villages of Shirakawa-go and Gokayama	Cultural	734
Laos	Town of Luang Prabang (F)	Cultural	479
Netherlands	Schokland and Surroundings (F)	Cultural	739
Philippines	Rice Terraces of the Philippine Cordilleras	Cultural	722
Portugal	Cultural Landscape of Sintra	Cultural	723
Russia	Virgin Komi Forests	Natural	719
South Korea	Haeinsa Temple Janggyeong Panjeon, the Depositories for the Tripitaka Koreana Woodblocks	Cultural	737
South Korea	Jongmyo Shrine	Cultural	738
South Korea	Seokguram Grotto and Bulguksa Temple (F)	Cultural	736
Sweden	Hanseatic Town of Visby	Cultural	731
United Kingdom	Old and New Towns of Edinburgh	Cultural	728
United Kingdom (Tristan da Cunha) (F)	Gough and Inaccessible Islands	Natural	740
United States	Carlsbad Caverns National Park	Natural	721
Uruguay	Historic Quarter of the City of Colonia del Sacramento (F)	Cultural	747

== 1996 (20th session) ==
37 sites (30 cultural, 5 natural, 2 mixed)
Host: Mexico

Country	Site	Category	UNESCO Reference no.
Armenia	Monasteries of Haghpat and Sanahin (F)	Cultural	777
Austria	Historic Centre of the City of Salzburg	Cultural	784
Austria	Palace and Gardens of Schönbrunn (F)	Cultural	786
Belize	Belize Barrier Reef Reserve System (F)	Natural	764
Benin; Burkina Faso; Niger	W-Arly-Pendjari Complex	Natural	749
China	Lushan National Park	Cultural	778
China	Mount Emei Scenic Area, including Leshan Giant Buddha Scenic Area	Mixed	779
Czech Republic	Lednice–Valtice Cultural Landscape	Cultural	763
(Zaire); DR Congo	Okapi Wildlife Reserve	Natural	718
Finland	Verla Groundwood and Board Mill	Cultural	751
France	Canal du Midi	Cultural	770
Georgia	Upper Svaneti	Cultural	709
Germany	Bauhaus and its Sites in Weimar, Dessau and Bernau	Cultural	729
Germany	Cologne Cathedral	Cultural	292
Germany	Luther Memorials in Eisleben and Wittenberg	Cultural	783
Greece	Archaeological Site of Aigai (modern name Vergina)	Cultural	780
Hungary	Millenary Benedictine Abbey of Pannonhalma and its Natural Environment	Cultural	758
Indonesia	Sangiran Early Man Site	Cultural	593
Ireland	Sceilg Mhichíl	Cultural	757
Italy	Castel del Monte	Cultural	398
Italy	Early Christian Monuments of Ravenna	Cultural	788
Italy	Historic Centre of the City of Pienza	Cultural	789
Italy	The Trulli of Alberobello	Cultural	787
Japan	Hiroshima Peace Memorial (Genbaku Dome)	Cultural	775
Japan	Itsukushima Shinto Shrine	Cultural	776
Mauritania	Ancient Ksour of Ouadane, Chinguetti, Tichitt and Oualata	Cultural	750
Mexico	Historic Monuments Zone of Querétaro	Cultural	792
Mexico	Pre-Hispanic Town of Uxmal	Cultural	791
Morocco	Historic City of Meknes	Cultural	793
Netherlands	Dutch Water Defence Lines	Cultural	759
Portugal	Historic Centre of Oporto, Luiz I Bridge and Monastery of Serra do Pilar	Cultural	755
Russia	Lake Baikal	Natural	754
Russia	Volcanoes of Kamchatka	Natural	765
Spain	Historic Walled Town of Cuenca	Cultural	781
Spain	La Lonja de la Seda de Valencia	Cultural	782
Sweden	Church Town of Gammelstad, Luleå	Cultural	762
Sweden	Laponian Area	Mixed	774

== 1997 (21st session) ==
46 sites (38 cultural, 7 natural, 1 mixed)
Host: Italy

Country	Site	Category	UNESCO Reference no.
Australia	Heard and McDonald Islands	Natural	577
Australia	Macquarie Island	Natural	629
Austria	Hallstatt-Dachstein / Salzkammergut Cultural Landscape	Cultural	806
Bangladesh	The Sundarbans	Natural	798
Brazil	Historic Centre of São Luís	Cultural	821
China	Ancient City of Ping Yao	Cultural	812
China	Classical Gardens of Suzhou	Cultural	813
China	Old Town of Lijiang	Cultural	811
Costa Rica	Cocos Island National Park	Natural	820
Croatia	Episcopal Complex of the Euphrasian Basilica in the Historic Centre of Poreč	Cultural	809
Croatia	Historic City of Trogir	Cultural	810
Cuba	San Pedro de la Roca Castle, Santiago de Cuba	Cultural	841
Dominica	Morne Trois Pitons National Park (F)	Natural	814
Estonia	Historic Centre (Old Town) of Tallinn (F)	Cultural	822
France	Historic Fortified City of Carcassonne	Cultural	345
France; Spain	Pyrénées - Mont Perdu	Mixed	773
Italy	18th-Century Royal Palace at Caserta with the Park, the Aqueduct of Vanvitelli, and the San Leucio Complex	Cultural	549
Italy	Archaeological Area of Agrigento	Cultural	831
Italy	Archaeological Areas of Pompei, Herculaneum and Torre Annunziata	Cultural	829
Italy	Botanical Garden (Orto Botanico), Padua	Cultural	824
Italy	Cathedral, Torre Civica and Piazza Grande, Modena	Cultural	827
Italy	Costiera Amalfitana	Cultural	830
Italy	Portovenere, Cinque Terre, and the Islands (Palmaria, Tino and Tinetto)	Cultural	826
Italy	Residences of the Royal House of Savoy	Cultural	823
Italy	Su Nuraxi di Barumini	Cultural	833
Italy	Villa Romana del Casale	Cultural	832
Kenya	Lake Turkana National Parks	Natural	801
Kenya	Mount Kenya National Park/Natural Forest (F)	Natural	800
Latvia	Historic Centre of Riga (F)	Cultural	852
Mexico	Hospicio Cabañas, Guadalajara	Cultural	815
Morocco	Archaeological Site of Volubilis	Cultural	836
Morocco	Medina of Tétouan (formerly known as Titawin)	Cultural	837
Nepal	Lumbini, the Birthplace of the Lord Buddha	Cultural	666
Netherlands	Mill Network at Kinderdijk-Elshout	Cultural	818
Netherlands (Curaçao) (F)	Historic Area of Willemstad, Inner City and Harbour, Curaçao	Cultural	819
Pakistan	Rohtas Fort	Cultural	586
Panama	Archaeological Site of Panamá Viejo and Historic District of Panamá	Cultural	790
Poland	Castle of the Teutonic Order in Malbork	Cultural	847
Poland	Medieval Town of Toruń	Cultural	835
South Korea	Changdeokgung Palace Complex	Cultural	816
South Korea	Hwaseong Fortress	Cultural	817
Spain	Las Médulas	Cultural	803
Spain	Palau de la Música Catalana and Hospital de Sant Pau, Barcelona	Cultural	804
Spain	San Millán Yuso and Suso Monasteries	Cultural	805
Tunisia	Dougga / Thugga	Cultural	794
United Kingdom	Maritime Greenwich	Cultural	795

== 1998 (22nd session) ==
30 sites (27 cultural, 3 natural)
Host: Japan

Country	Site	Category	UNESCO Reference no.
Austria	Semmering Railway	Cultural	785
Belgium	Flemish Béguinages	Cultural	855
Belgium	La Grand-Place, Brussels (F)	Cultural	857
Belgium	The Four Lifts on the Canal du Centre and their Environs, La Louvière and Le Roeulx (Hainaut)	Cultural	856
Bolivia	Fuerte de Samaipata	Cultural	883
China	Summer Palace, an Imperial Garden in Beijing	Cultural	880
China	Temple of Heaven: an Imperial Sacrificial Altar in Beijing	Cultural	881
Cyprus	Choirokoitia	Cultural	848
Czech Republic	Gardens and Castle at Kroměříž	Cultural	860
Czech Republic	Holašovice Historic Village	Cultural	861
France	Historic Site of Lyon	Cultural	872
France	Routes of Santiago de Compostela in France	Cultural	868
Germany	Classical Weimar	Cultural	846
Italy	Archaeological Area and the Patriarchal Basilica of Aquileia	Cultural	825
Italy	Cilento and Vallo di Diano National Park with the Archeological Sites of Paestum and Velia, and the Certosa di Padula	Cultural	842
Italy	Historic Centre of Urbino	Cultural	828
Japan	Historic Monuments of Ancient Nara	Cultural	870
Lebanon	Ouadi Qadisha (the Holy Valley) and the Forest of the Cedars of God (Horsh Arz el-Rab)	Cultural	850
Mexico	Archaeological Zone of Paquimé, Casas Grandes	Cultural	560
Mexico	Historic Monuments Zone of Tlacotalpan	Cultural	862
Netherlands	Ir.D.F. Woudagemaal (D.F. Wouda Steam Pumping Station)	Cultural	867
New Zealand	New Zealand Sub-Antarctic Islands	Natural	877
Portugal; Spain	Prehistoric Rock Art Sites in the Côa Valley and Siega Verde	Cultural	866
Russia	Golden Mountains of Altai	Natural	768
Solomon Islands	East Rennell (F)	Natural	854
Spain	Rock Art of the Mediterranean Basin on the Iberian Peninsula	Cultural	874
Spain	University and Historic Precinct of Alcalá de Henares	Cultural	876
Sweden	Naval Port of Karlskrona	Cultural	871
Turkey	Archaeological Site of Troy	Cultural	849
Ukraine	L'viv – the Ensemble of the Historic Centre	Cultural	865

== 1999 (23rd session) ==
48 sites (35 cultural, 11 natural, 2 mixed)
Host: Morocco

Country	Site	Category	UNESCO Reference no.
Argentina	Cueva de las Manos, Río Pinturas	Cultural	936
Argentina	Península Valdés	Natural	937
Austria	City of Graz – Historic Centre and Schloss Eggenberg	Cultural	931
Belgium; France	Belfries of Belgium and France	Cultural	943
Brazil	Atlantic Forest South-East Reserves	Natural	893
Brazil	Discovery Coast Atlantic Forest Reserves	Natural	892
Brazil	Historic Centre of the Town of Diamantina	Cultural	890
Canada	Miguasha National Park	Natural	686
China	Dazu Rock Carvings	Cultural	912
China	Mount Wuyi	Mixed	911
Costa Rica	Area de Conservación Guanacaste	Natural	928
Cuba	Desembarco del Granma National Park	Natural	889
Cuba	Viñales Valley	Cultural	840
Czech Republic	Litomyšl Castle	Cultural	901
Ecuador	Historic Centre of Santa Ana de los Ríos de Cuenca	Cultural	863
Finland	Bronze Age Burial Site of Sammallahdenmäki	Cultural	579
France	Jurisdiction of Saint-Emilion	Cultural	932
Germany	Museumsinsel (Museum Island), Berlin	Cultural	896
Germany	Wartburg Castle	Cultural	897
Greece	Archaeological Sites of Mycenae and Tiryns	Cultural	941
Greece	The Historic Centre (Chorá) with the Monastery of Saint-John the Theologian and the Cave of the Apocalypse on the Island of Pátmos	Cultural	942
Hungary	Hortobágy National Park - the Puszta	Cultural	474
India	Mountain Railways of India	Cultural	944
Indonesia	Lorentz National Park	Natural	955
Italy	Villa Adriana (Tivoli)	Cultural	907
Japan	Shrines and Temples of Nikko	Cultural	913
Mexico	Archaeological Monuments Zone of Xochicalco	Cultural	939
Mexico	Historic Fortified Town of Campeche	Cultural	895
Mozambique; South Africa	iSimangaliso Wetland Park – Maputo National Park	Natural	914
Netherlands	Droogmakerij de Beemster (Beemster Polder)	Cultural	899
Nigeria	Sukur Cultural Landscape (F)	Cultural	938
Philippines	Historic City of Vigan	Cultural	502
Philippines	Puerto-Princesa Subterranean River National Park	Natural	652
Poland	Kalwaria Zebrzydowska: the Mannerist Architectural and Park Landscape Complex and Pilgrimage Park	Cultural	905
Portugal	Laurisilva of Madeira	Natural	934
Romania	Dacian Fortresses of the Orastie Mountains	Cultural	906
Romania	Historic Centre of Sighişoara	Cultural	902
Romania	Wooden Churches of Maramureş	Cultural	904
Russia	Western Caucasus	Natural	900
Saint Kitts and Nevis	Brimstone Hill Fortress National Park (F)	Cultural	910
South Africa	Fossil Hominid Sites of South Africa	Cultural	915
South Africa	Robben Island (F)	Cultural	916
Spain	Ibiza, Biodiversity and Culture	Mixed	417
Spain	San Cristóbal de La Laguna	Cultural	929
Turkmenistan	State Historical and Cultural Park 'Ancient Merv' (F)	Cultural	886
United Kingdom	Heart of Neolithic Orkney	Cultural	514
Vietnam	Hoi An Ancient Town	Cultural	948
Vietnam	My Son Sanctuary	Cultural	949

== 2000 (24th session) ==
61 sites (50 cultural, 10 natural, 1 mixed)
Host: Australia

Country	Site	Category	UNESCO Reference no.
Argentina	Ischigualasto / Talampaya Natural Parks	Natural	966
Argentina	Jesuit Block and Estancias of Córdoba	Cultural	995
Armenia	Cathedral and Churches of Echmiatsin and the Archaeological Site of Zvartnots	Cultural	1011
Armenia	Monastery of Geghard and the Upper Azat Valley	Cultural	960
Australia	Greater Blue Mountains Area	Natural	917
Austria	Wachau Cultural Landscape	Cultural	970
Azerbaijan	Walled City of Baku with the Shirvanshah's Palace and Maiden Tower (F)	Cultural	958
Belarus	Mir Castle Complex	Cultural	625
Belgium	Historic Centre of Brugge	Cultural	996
Belgium	Major Town Houses of the Architect Victor Horta (Brussels)	Cultural	1005
Belgium	Neolithic Flint Mines at Spiennes (Mons)	Cultural	1006
Belgium	Notre-Dame Cathedral in Tournai	Cultural	1009
Bolivia	Noel Kempff Mercado National Park	Natural	967
Bolivia	Tiwanaku: Spiritual and Political Centre of the Tiwanaku Culture	Cultural	567
Brazil	Central Amazon Conservation Complex	Natural	998
Brazil	Pantanal Conservation Area	Natural	999
Chile	Churches of Chiloé	Cultural	971
China	Ancient Villages in Southern Anhui – Xidi and Hongcun	Cultural	1002
China	Imperial Tombs of the Ming and Qing Dynasties	Cultural	1004
China	Longmen Grottoes	Cultural	1003
China	Mount Qingcheng and the Dujiangyan Irrigation System	Cultural	1001
Croatia	The Cathedral of St James in Šibenik	Cultural	963
Cuba	Archaeological Landscape of the First Coffee Plantations in the South-East of Cuba	Cultural	1008
Czech Republic	Holy Trinity Column in Olomouc	Cultural	859
Denmark	Kronborg Castle	Cultural	696
Finland; Sweden	High Coast / Kvarken Archipelago	Natural	898
France	The Loire Valley between Sully-sur-Loire and Chalonnes	Cultural	933
Germany	Garden Kingdom of Dessau-Wörlitz	Cultural	534
Germany	Monastic Island of Reichenau	Cultural	974
Hungary	Early Christian Necropolis of Pécs (Sopianae)	Cultural	853
Italy	Assisi, the Basilica of San Francesco and Other Franciscan Sites	Cultural	990
Italy	City of Verona	Cultural	797
Italy	Isole Eolie (Aeolian Islands)	Natural	908
Japan	Gusuku Sites and Related Properties of the Kingdom of Ryukyu	Cultural	972
Lesotho (F); South Africa	Maloti-Drakensberg Park	Mixed	985
Lithuania; Russia	Curonian Spit	Cultural	994
Malaysia	Gunung Mulu National Park	Natural	1013
Malaysia	Kinabalu Park (F)	Natural	1012
Netherlands	Rietveld Schröderhuis (Rietveld Schröder House)	Cultural	965
Nicaragua	Ruins of León Viejo (F)	Cultural	613
Oman	Land of Frankincense	Cultural	1010
Peru	Historical Centre of the City of Arequipa	Cultural	1016
Russia	Ensemble of the Ferapontov Monastery	Cultural	982
Russia	Historic and Architectural Complex of the Kazan Kremlin	Cultural	980
Senegal	Island of Saint-Louis	Cultural	956
Slovakia	Bardejov Town Conservation Reserve	Cultural	973
South Korea	Gochang, Hwasun and Ganghwa Dolmen Sites	Cultural	977
South Korea	Gyeongju Historic Areas	Cultural	976
Spain	Archaeological Ensemble of Tarraco	Cultural	875
Spain	Archaeological Site of Atapuerca	Cultural	989
Spain	Catalan Romanesque Churches of the Vall de Boí	Cultural	988
Spain	Palmeral of Elche	Cultural	930
Spain	Roman Walls of Lugo	Cultural	987
Suriname	Central Suriname Nature Reserve (F)	Natural	1017
Sweden	Agricultural Landscape of Southern Öland	Cultural	968
Switzerland	Three Castles, Defensive Wall and Ramparts of the Market-Town of Bellinzona	Cultural	884
Tanzania	Stone Town of Zanzibar	Cultural	173
United Kingdom	Blaenavon Industrial Landscape	Cultural	984
United Kingdom (Bermuda) (F)	Historic Town of St George and Related Fortifications, Bermuda	Cultural	983
Uzbekistan	Historic Centre of Shakhrisyabz	Cultural	885
Venezuela	Ciudad Universitaria de Caracas	Cultural	986

== 2001 (25th session) ==
31 sites (25 cultural, 6 natural)
Host: Finland

Country	Site	Category	UNESCO Reference no.
Austria	Historic Centre of Vienna	Cultural	1033
Austria; Hungary	Fertö / Neusiedlersee Cultural Landscape	Cultural	772
Botswana	Tsodilo (F)	Cultural	1021
Brazil	Brazilian Atlantic Islands: Fernando de Noronha and Atol das Rocas Reserves	Natural	1000
Brazil	Cerrado Protected Areas: Chapada dos Veadeiros and Emas National Parks	Natural	1035
Brazil	Historic Centre of the Town of Goiás	Cultural	993
China	Yungang Grottoes	Cultural	1039
Cuba	Alejandro de Humboldt National Park	Natural	839
Czech Republic	Tugendhat Villa in Brno	Cultural	1052
France	Provins, Town of Medieval Fairs	Cultural	873
Germany	Zollverein Coal Mine Industrial Complex in Essen	Cultural	975
Israel	Masada (F)	Cultural	1040
Israel	Old City of Acre	Cultural	1042
Italy	Villa d'Este, Tivoli	Cultural	1025
Kenya	Lamu Old Town	Cultural	1055
Laos	Vat Phou and Associated Ancient Settlements within the Champasak Cultural Landscape	Cultural	481
Madagascar	Royal Hill of Ambohimanga	Cultural	950
Morocco	Medina of Essaouira (formerly Mogador)	Cultural	753
Poland	Churches of Peace in Jawor and Świdnica	Cultural	1054
Portugal	Alto Douro Wine Region	Cultural	1046
Portugal	Historic Centre of Guimarães and Couros Zone	Cultural	1031
Russia	Central Sikhote-Alin	Natural	766
Spain	Aranjuez Cultural Landscape	Cultural	1044
Sweden	Mining Area of the Great Copper Mountain in Falun	Cultural	1027
Switzerland	Swiss Alps Jungfrau-Aletsch	Natural	1037
Uganda	Tombs of Buganda Kings at Kasubi	Cultural	1022
United Kingdom	Derwent Valley Mills	Cultural	1030
United Kingdom	Dorset and East Devon Coast	Natural	1029
United Kingdom	New Lanark	Cultural	429
United Kingdom	Saltaire	Cultural	1028
Uzbekistan	Samarkand – Crossroad of Cultures	Cultural	603

== 2002 (26th session) ==
9 sites (8 cultural, 1 mixed)
Host: Hungary

Country	Site	Category	UNESCO Reference no.
Afghanistan	Minaret and Archaeological Remains of Jam (F)	Cultural	211
Egypt	Saint Catherine Area	Cultural	954
Germany	Historic Centres of Stralsund and Wismar	Cultural	1067
Germany	Upper Middle Rhine Valley	Cultural	1066
Hungary	Tokaj Wine Region Historic Cultural Landscape	Cultural	1063
India	Mahabodhi Temple Complex at Bodh Gaya	Cultural	1056
Italy	Late Baroque Towns of the Val di Noto (South-Eastern Sicily)	Cultural	1024
Mexico	Ancient Maya City and Protected Tropical Forests of Calakmul, Campeche	Mixed	1061
Suriname	Historic Inner City of Paramaribo	Cultural	940

== 2003 (27th session) ==
24 sites (19 cultural, 5 natural)
Host: France

Country	Site	Category	UNESCO Reference no.
Afghanistan	Cultural Landscape and Archaeological Remains of the Bamiyan Valley	Cultural	208
Argentina	Quebrada de Humahuaca	Cultural	1116
Australia	Purnululu National Park	Natural	1094
Chile	Historic Quarter of the Seaport City of Valparaíso	Cultural	959
China	Three Parallel Rivers of Yunnan Protected Areas	Natural	1083
Czech Republic	Jewish Quarter and St Procopius' Basilica in Třebíč	Cultural	1078
Gambia	Kunta Kinteh Island and Related Sites (F)	Cultural	761
India	Rock Shelters of Bhimbetka	Cultural	925
Iran	Takht-e Soleyman	Cultural	1077
Iraq	Ashur (Qal'at Sherqat)	Cultural	1130
Israel	White City of Tel-Aviv – the Modern Movement	Cultural	1096
Italy	Sacri Monti of Piedmont and Lombardy	Cultural	1068
Italy; Switzerland	Monte San Giorgio	Natural	1090
Kazakhstan	Mausoleum of Khoja Ahmed Yasawi (F)	Cultural	1103
Laos; Vietnam	Phong Nha-Ke Bang National Park and Hin Nam No National Park	Natural	951
Mexico	Franciscan Missions in the Sierra Gorda of Querétaro	Cultural	1079
Mongolia (F); Russia	Uvs Nuur Basin	Natural	769
Poland	Wooden Churches of Southern Małopolska	Cultural	1053
Russia	Citadel, Ancient City and Fortress Buildings of Derbent	Cultural	1070
South Africa	Mapungubwe Cultural Landscape	Cultural	1099
Spain	Renaissance Monumental Ensembles of Úbeda and Baeza	Cultural	522
Sudan	Gebel Barkal and the Sites of the Napatan Region (F)	Cultural	1073
United Kingdom	Royal Botanic Gardens, Kew	Cultural	1084
Zimbabwe	Matobo Hills	Cultural	306

== 2004 (28th session) ==
34 sites (29 cultural, 5 natural)
Host: China

Country	Site	Category	UNESCO Reference no.
Andorra	Madriu-Perafita-Claror Valley (F)	Cultural	1160
Australia	Royal Exhibition Building and Carlton Gardens	Cultural	1131
Benin; Togo (F)	Koutammakou, the Land of the Batammariba	Cultural	1140
China	Capital Cities and Tombs of the Ancient Koguryo Kingdom	Cultural	1135
Denmark (Greenland) (F)	Ilulissat Icefjord	Natural	1149
Germany	Dresden Elbe Valley (delisted in 2009)	Cultural	1156
Germany	Town Hall and Roland on the Marketplace of Bremen	Cultural	1087
Germany; Poland	Muskauer Park / Park Mużakowski	Cultural	1127
Iceland	Þingvellir National Park (F)	Cultural	1152
India	Champaner-Pavagadh Archaeological Park	Cultural	1101
India	Chhatrapati Shivaji Terminus (formerly Victoria Terminus)	Cultural	945
Indonesia	Tropical Rainforest Heritage of Sumatra	Natural	1167
Iran	Bam and its Cultural Landscape	Cultural	1208
Iran	Pasargadae	Cultural	1106
Italy	Etruscan Necropolises of Cerveteri and Tarquinia	Cultural	1158
Italy	Val d'Orcia	Cultural	1026
Japan	Sacred Sites and Pilgrimage Routes in the Kii Mountain Range	Cultural	1142
Jordan	Um er-Rasas (Kastrom Mefa'a)	Cultural	1093
Kazakhstan	Petroglyphs within the Archaeological Landscape of Tamgaly	Cultural	1145
Lithuania	Kernavė Archaeological Site (Cultural Reserve of Kernavė)	Cultural	1137
Mali	Tomb of Askia	Cultural	1139
Mexico	Luis Barragán House and Studio	Cultural	1136
Mongolia	Orkhon Valley Cultural Landscape	Cultural	1081
Morocco	Portuguese City of Mazagan (El Jadida)	Cultural	1058
North Korea	Complex of Koguryo Tombs (F)	Cultural	1091
Norway	Vegaøyan – The Vega Archipelago	Cultural	1143
Portugal	Landscape of the Pico Island Vineyard Culture	Cultural	1117
Russia	Ensemble of the Novodevichy Convent	Cultural	1097
Russia	Natural System of Wrangel Island Reserve	Natural	1023
Saint Lucia	Pitons Management Area (F)	Natural	1161
(Serbia and Montenegro); Serbia	Medieval Monuments in Kosovo	Cultural	724
South Africa	Cape Floral Region Protected Areas	Natural	1007
Sweden	Grimeton Radio Station, Varberg	Cultural	1134
United Kingdom	Liverpool – Maritime Mercantile City (delisted in 2021)	Cultural	1150

== 2005 (29th session) ==
24 sites (17 cultural, 7 natural)
Host: South Africa

Country	Site	Category	UNESCO Reference no.
Albania	Historic Centres of Berat and Gjirokastra	Cultural	569
Bahrain	Qal'at al-Bahrain – Ancient Harbour and Capital of Dilmun (F)	Cultural	1192
Belarus	Architectural, Residential and Cultural Complex of the Radziwill Family at Nesvizh	Cultural	1196
Belarus; Estonia; Finland; Latvia; Lithuania; Moldova (F); Norway; Russia; Sweden; Ukraine	Struve Geodetic Arc	Cultural	1187
Belgium	Plantin-Moretus House-Workshops-Museum Complex	Cultural	1185
Bosnia and Herzegovina	Old Bridge Area of the Old City of Mostar (F)	Cultural	946
Chile	Humberstone and Santa Laura Saltpeter Works	Cultural	1178
China (Macao) (F)	Historic Centre of Macao	Cultural	1110
Cuba	Urban Historic Centre of Cienfuegos	Cultural	1202
Egypt	Wadi Al-Hitan (Whale Valley)	Natural	1186
France	Le Havre, the City Rebuilt by Auguste Perret	Cultural	1181
Iran	Soltaniyeh	Cultural	1188
Israel	Biblical Tels – Megiddo, Hazor, Beer Sheba	Cultural	1108
Israel	Incense Route – Desert Cities in the Negev	Cultural	1107
Italy	Syracuse and the Rocky Necropolis of Pantalica	Cultural	1200
Japan	Shiretoko Peninsula	Natural	1193
Mexico	Islands and Protected Areas of the Gulf of California	Natural	1182
Nigeria	Osun-Osogbo Sacred Grove	Cultural	1118
Norway	West Norwegian Fjords – Geirangerfjord and Nærøyfjord	Natural	1195
Panama	Coiba National Park and its Special Zone of Marine Protection	Natural	1138
Russia	Historical Centre of the City of Yaroslavl	Cultural	1170
South Africa	Vredefort Dome	Natural	1162
Thailand	Dong Phayayen-Khao Yai Forest Complex	Natural	590
Turkmenistan	Kunya-Urgench	Cultural	1199

== 2006 (30th session) ==
18 sites (16 cultural, 2 natural)
Host: Lithuania

Country	Site	Category	UNESCO Reference no.
Chile	Sewell Mining Town	Cultural	1214
China	Sichuan Giant Panda Sanctuaries - Wolong, Mt Siguniang and Jiajin Mountains	Natural	1213
China	Yin Xu	Cultural	1114
Colombia	Malpelo Fauna and Flora Sanctuary	Natural	1216
Ethiopia	Harar Jugol, the Fortified Historic Town	Cultural	1189
Gambia; Senegal	Stone Circles of Senegambia	Cultural	1226
Germany	Old town of Regensburg with Stadtamhof	Cultural	1155
Iran	Behistun Inscription	Cultural	1222
Italy	Genoa: Le Strade Nuove and the system of the Palazzi dei Rolli	Cultural	1211
Malawi	Chongoni Rock-Art Area	Cultural	476
Mauritius	Aapravasi Ghat (F)	Cultural	1227
Mexico	Agave Landscape and Ancient Industrial Facilities of Tequila	Cultural	1209
Oman	Aflaj Irrigation Systems of Oman	Cultural	1207
Poland	Centennial Hall in Wrocław	Cultural	1165
Spain	Vizcaya Bridge	Cultural	1217
Syria	Crac des Chevaliers and Qal'at Salah El-Din	Cultural	1229
Tanzania	Kondoa Rock-Art Sites	Cultural	1183
United Kingdom	Cornwall and West Devon Mining Landscape	Cultural	1215

== 2007 (31st session) ==
22 sites (16 cultural, 4 natural, 2 mixed)
Host: New Zealand

Country	Site	Category	UNESCO Reference no.
Albania; Austria; Belgium; Bosnia and Herzegovina; Bulgaria; Croatia; Czech Republic; France; Germany; Italy; North Macedonia; Poland; Romania; Slovakia; Slovenia; Spain; Switzerland; Ukraine	Ancient and Primeval Beech Forests of the Carpathians and Other Regions of Europe	Natural	1133
Australia	Sydney Opera House	Cultural	166
Azerbaijan	Gobustan Rock Art Cultural Landscape	Cultural	1076
Bosnia and Herzegovina	Mehmed Paša Sokolović Bridge in Višegrad	Cultural	1260
Canada	Rideau Canal	Cultural	1221
China	Kaiping Diaolou and Villages	Cultural	1112
China	South China Karst	Mixed	1248
France	Bordeaux, Port of the Moon	Cultural	1256
Gabon	Ecosystem and Relict Cultural Landscape of Lopé-Okanda (F)	Mixed	1147
Greece	Old Town of Corfu	Cultural	978
India	Red Fort Complex	Cultural	231
Iraq	Samarra Archaeological City	Cultural	276
Japan	Iwami Ginzan Silver Mine and its Cultural Landscape	Cultural	1246
Madagascar	Rainforests of the Atsinanana	Natural	1257
Mexico	Central University City Campus of the Universidad Nacional Autónoma de México (UNAM)	Cultural	1250
Namibia	Twyfelfontein or /Ui-//aes (F)	Cultural	1255
Serbia	Gamzigrad-Romuliana, Palace of Galerius	Cultural	1253
South Africa	Richtersveld Cultural and Botanical Landscape	Cultural	1265
South Korea	Jeju Volcanic Island and Lava Tubes	Natural	1264
Spain	Teide National Park	Natural	1258
Switzerland	Lavaux, Vineyard Terraces	Cultural	1243
Turkmenistan	Parthian Fortresses of Nisa	Cultural	1242

== 2008 (32nd session) ==
27 sites (19 cultural, 8 natural)
Host: Canada

Country	Site	Category	UNESCO Reference no.
Cambodia	Preah Vihear	Cultural	1224
Canada	Joggins Fossil Cliffs	Natural	1285
China	Fujian Tulou	Cultural	1113
China	Mount Sanqingshan National Park	Natural	1292
Croatia	Stari Grad Plain	Cultural	1240
Cuba	Historic Centre of Camagüey	Cultural	1270
France	Fortifications of Vauban	Cultural	1283
France (New Caledonia) (F)	Lagoons of New Caledonia: Reef Diversity and Associated Ecosystems	Natural	1115
Germany	Berlin Modernism Housing Estates	Cultural	1239
Iceland	Surtsey	Natural	1267
Iran	Armenian Monastic Ensembles of Iran	Cultural	1262
Israel	Bahá'í Holy Places in Haifa and the Western Galilee	Cultural	1220
Italy	Mantua and Sabbioneta	Cultural	1287
Italy; Switzerland	Rhaetian Railway in the Albula / Bernina Landscapes	Cultural	1276
Kazakhstan	Saryarka – Steppe and Lakes of Northern Kazakhstan	Natural	1102
Kenya	Sacred Mijikenda Kaya Forests	Cultural	1231
Malaysia	Melaka and George Town, Historic Cities of the Straits of Malacca	Cultural	1223
Mauritius	Le Morne Cultural Landscape	Cultural	1259
Mexico	Monarch Butterfly Biosphere Reserve	Natural	1290
Mexico	Protective town of San Miguel and the Sanctuary of Jesús Nazareno de Atotonilco	Cultural	1274
Papua New Guinea	Kuk Early Agricultural Site (F)	Cultural	887
San Marino	San Marino Historic Centre and Mount Titano (F)	Cultural	1245
Saudi Arabia	Hegra Archaeological Site (al-Hijr / Madā ͐ in Ṣāliḥ) (F)	Cultural	1293
Slovakia	Wooden Churches of the Slovak part of the Carpathian Mountain Area	Cultural	1273
Switzerland	Swiss Tectonic Arena Sardona	Natural	1179
Vanuatu	Chief Roi Mata's Domain (F)	Cultural	1280
Yemen	Socotra Archipelago	Natural	1263

== 2009 (33rd session) ==
13 sites (11 cultural, 2 natural)
Host: Spain

Country	Site	Category	UNESCO Reference no.
Belgium	Stoclet House	Cultural	1298
Burkina Faso	Ruins of Loropéni (F)	Cultural	1225
Cape Verde	Cidade Velha, Historic Centre of Ribeira Grande (F)	Cultural	1310
China	Mount Wutai	Cultural	1279
Denmark; Germany; Netherlands	Wadden Sea	Natural	1314
Iran	Shushtar Historical Hydraulic System	Cultural	1315
Italy	The Dolomites	Natural	1237
Kyrgyzstan	Sulaiman-Too Sacred Mountain (F)	Cultural	1230
Peru	Sacred City of Caral-Supe	Cultural	1269
South Korea	Royal Tombs of the Joseon Dynasty	Cultural	1319
Spain	Tower of Hercules	Cultural	1312
Switzerland	La Chaux-de-Fonds / Le Locle, Watchmaking Town Planning	Cultural	1302
United Kingdom	Pontcysyllte Aqueduct and Canal	Cultural	1303

== 2010 (34th session) ==
21 sites (15 cultural, 5 natural, 1 mixed)
Host: Brazil

Country	Site	Category	UNESCO Reference no.
Australia	Australian Convict Sites	Cultural	1306
Brazil	São Francisco Square in the Town of São Cristóvão	Cultural	1272
China	China Danxia	Natural	1335
China	Historic Monuments of Dengfeng in 'The Centre of Heaven and Earth'	Cultural	1305
France	Episcopal City of Albi	Cultural	1337
France (Réunion) (F)	Pitons, cirques and remparts of Reunion Island	Natural	1317
India	The Jantar Mantar, Jaipur	Cultural	1338
Iran	Sheikh Safi al-Din Khānegāh and Shrine Ensemble in Ardabil	Cultural	1345
Iran	Tabriz Historic Bazaar Complex	Cultural	1346
Kiribati	Phoenix Islands Protected Area (F)	Natural	1325
Marshall Islands	Bikini Atoll Nuclear Test Site (F)	Cultural	1339
Mexico	Camino Real de Tierra Adentro	Cultural	1351
Mexico	Prehistoric Caves of Yagul and Mitla in the Central Valley of Oaxaca	Cultural	1352
Netherlands	Seventeenth-Century Canal Ring Area of Amsterdam inside the Singelgracht	Cultural	1349
Russia	Putorana Plateau	Natural	1234
Saudi Arabia	At-Turaif District in ad-Dir'iyah	Cultural	1329
South Korea	Historic Villages of Korea: Hahoe and Yangdong	Cultural	1324
Sri Lanka	Central Highlands of Sri Lanka	Natural	1203
Tajikistan	Proto-urban Site of Sarazm (F)	Cultural	1141
United States	Papahānaumokuākea	Mixed	1326
Vietnam	Central Sector of the Imperial Citadel of Thang Long - Hanoi	Cultural	1328

== 2011 (35th session) ==
25 sites (21 cultural, 3 natural, 1 mixed)
Host: France

Country	Site	Category	UNESCO Reference no.
Australia	Ningaloo Coast	Natural	1369
Austria; France; Germany; Italy; Slovenia; Switzerland	Prehistoric Pile dwellings around the Alps	Cultural	1363
Barbados	Historic Bridgetown and its Garrison (F)	Cultural	1376
China	West Lake Cultural Landscape of Hangzhou	Cultural	1334
Colombia	Coffee Cultural Landscape of Colombia	Cultural	1121
Ethiopia	Konso Cultural Landscape	Cultural	1333
France	The Causses and the Cévennes, Mediterranean agro-pastoral Cultural Landscape	Cultural	1153
Germany	Fagus Factory in Alfeld	Cultural	1368
Iran	The Persian Garden	Cultural	1372
Italy	Longobards in Italy. Places of the Power (568–774 A.D.)	Cultural	1318
Japan	Hiraizumi – Temples, Gardens and Archaeological Sites Representing the Buddhist Pure Land	Cultural	1277
Japan	Ogasawara Islands	Natural	1362
Jordan	Wadi Rum Protected Area	Mixed	1377
Kenya	Fort Jesus, Mombasa	Cultural	1295
Kenya	Kenya Lake System in the Great Rift Valley	Natural	1060
Mongolia	Petroglyphic Complexes of the Mongolian Altai	Cultural	1382
Nicaragua	León Cathedral	Cultural	1236
Senegal	Saloum Delta	Cultural	1359
Spain	Cultural Landscape of the Serra de Tramuntana	Cultural	1371
Sudan	Archaeological Sites of the Island of Meroe	Cultural	1336
Syria	Ancient Villages of Northern Syria	Cultural	1348
Turkey	Selimiye Mosque and its Social Complex	Cultural	1366
Ukraine	Residence of Bukovinian and Dalmatian Metropolitans	Cultural	1330
United Arab Emirates	Cultural Sites of Al Ain (Hafit, Hili, Bidaa Bint Saud and Oases Areas) (F)	Cultural	1343
Vietnam	Citadel of the Ho Dynasty	Cultural	1358

== 2012 (36th session) ==
26 sites (20 cultural, 5 natural, 1 mixed)
Host: Russia

Country	Site	Category	UNESCO Reference no.
Bahrain	Pearling, Testimony of an Island Economy	Cultural	1364
Belgium	Major Mining Sites of Wallonia	Cultural	1344
Brazil	Rio de Janeiro: Carioca Landscapes between the Mountain and the Sea	Cultural	1100
Cameroon; Central African Republic; Congo (F)	Sangha Trinational	Natural	1380
Canada	Landscape of Grand Pré	Cultural	1404
Chad	Lakes of Ounianga (F)	Natural	1400
China	Chengjiang Fossil Site	Natural	1388
China	Site of Xanadu	Cultural	1389
Côte d'Ivoire	Historic Town of Grand-Bassam	Cultural	1322
France	Nord-Pas de Calais Mining Basin	Cultural	1360
Germany	Margravial Opera House Bayreuth	Cultural	1379
India	Western Ghats	Natural	1342
Indonesia	Cultural Landscape of Bali Province: the Subak as a Manifestation of the Tri Hita Karana Philosophy	Cultural	1194
Iran	Gonbad-e Qābus	Cultural	1398
Iran	Masjed-e Jāmé of Isfahan	Cultural	1397
Israel	Sites of Human Evolution at Mount Carmel: The Nahal Me'arot / Wadi el-Mughara Caves	Cultural	1393
Malaysia	Archaeological Heritage of the Lenggong Valley	Cultural	1396
Morocco	Rabat, Modern Capital and Historic City: a Shared Heritage	Cultural	1401
Palau	Rock Islands Southern Lagoon (F)	Mixed	1386
Palestine	Birthplace of Jesus: Church of the Nativity and the Pilgrimage Route, Bethlehem (F)	Cultural	1433
Portugal	Garrison Border Town of Elvas and its Fortifications	Cultural	1367
Russia	Lena Pillars Nature Park	Natural	1299
Senegal	Bassari Country: Bassari, Fula and Bedik Cultural Landscapes	Cultural	1407
Slovenia; Spain	Heritage of Mercury. Almadén and Idrija	Cultural	1313
Sweden	Decorated Farmhouses of Hälsingland	Cultural	1282
Turkey	Neolithic Site of Çatalhöyük	Cultural	1405

== 2013 (37th session) ==
19 sites (14 cultural, 5 natural)
Host: Cambodia

Country	Site	Category	UNESCO Reference no.
Canada	Red Bay Basque Whaling Station	Cultural	1412
China	Cultural Landscape of Honghe Hani Rice Terraces	Cultural	1111
China	Xinjiang Tianshan	Natural	1414
Fiji	Levuka Historical Port Town (F)	Cultural	1399
Germany	Bergpark Wilhelmshöhe	Cultural	1413
India	Hill Forts of Rajasthan	Cultural	247
Iran	Golestan Palace	Cultural	1422
Italy	Medici Villas and Gardens in Tuscany	Cultural	175
Italy	Mount Etna	Natural	1427
Japan	Fujisan, sacred place and source of artistic inspiration	Cultural	1418
Mexico	El Pinacate and Gran Desierto de Altar Biosphere Reserve	Natural	1410
Namibia	Namib Sand Sea	Natural	1430
Niger	Historic Centre of Agadez	Cultural	1268
North Korea	Historic Monuments and Sites in Kaesong	Cultural	1278
Poland; Ukraine	Wooden Tserkvas of the Carpathian Region in Poland and Ukraine	Cultural	1424
Portugal	University of Coimbra – Alta and Sofia	Cultural	1387
Qatar	Al Zubarah Archaeological Site (F)	Cultural	1402
Tajikistan	Tajik National Park (Mountains of the Pamirs)	Natural	1252
Ukraine	Ancient City of Tauric Chersonese and its Chora	Cultural	1411

== 2014 (38th session) ==
26 sites (22 cultural, 3 natural, 1 mixed)
Host: Qatar

Country	Site	Category	UNESCO Reference no.
Argentina; Bolivia; Chile; Colombia; Ecuador; Peru	Qhapaq Ñan, Andean Road System	Cultural	1459
Botswana	Okavango Delta	Natural	1432
China	The Grand Canal	Cultural	1443
China; Kazakhstan; Kyrgyzstan	Silk Roads: the Routes Network of Chang'an-Tianshan Corridor	Cultural	1442
Costa Rica	Precolumbian Chiefdom Settlements with Stone Spheres of the Diquís	Cultural	1453
Denmark	Stevns Klint	Natural	1416
France	Decorated Cave of Pont d'Arc, known as Grotte Chauvet-Pont d'Arc, Ardèche	Cultural	1426
Germany	Carolingian Westwork and Civitas Corvey	Cultural	1447
India	Great Himalayan National Park Conservation Area	Natural	1406
India	Rani-ki-Vav (the Queen's Stepwell) at Patan, Gujarat	Cultural	922
Iran	Shahr-I Sokhta	Cultural	1456
Iraq	Erbil Citadel	Cultural	1437
Israel	Caves of Maresha and Bet-Guvrin in the Judean Lowlands as a Microcosm of the Land of the Caves	Cultural	1370
Italy	Vineyard Landscape of Piedmont: Langhe-Roero and Monferrato	Cultural	1390
Japan	Tomioka Silk Mill and Related Sites	Cultural	1449
Myanmar	Pyu Ancient Cities (F)	Cultural	1444
Netherlands	Van Nellefabriek	Cultural	1441
Palestine	Palestine: Land of Olives and Vines – Cultural Landscape of Southern Jerusalem, Battir	Cultural	1492
Philippines	Mount Hamiguitan Range Wildlife Sanctuary	Natural	1403
Russia	Bolghar Historical and Archaeological Complex	Cultural	981
Saudi Arabia	Historic Jeddah, the Gate to Makkah	Cultural	1361
South Korea	Namhansanseong	Cultural	1439
Turkey	Bursa and Cumalıkızık: the Birth of the Ottoman Empire	Cultural	1452
Turkey	Pergamon and its Multi-Layered Cultural Landscape	Cultural	1457
United States	Monumental Earthworks of Poverty Point	Cultural	1435
Vietnam	Trang An Landscape Complex	Mixed	1438

== 2015 (39th session) ==
24 sites (23 cultural, 1 mixed)
Host: Germany

Country	Site	Category	UNESCO Reference no.
China	Tusi Sites	Cultural	1474
Denmark; Germany; United Kingdom; United States	Moravian Church Settlements	Cultural	1468
Denmark	The par force hunting landscape in North Zealand	Cultural	1469
France	The Climats, terroirs of Burgundy	Cultural	1425
France	Champagne Hillsides, Houses and Cellars	Cultural	1465
Germany	Speicherstadt and Kontorhaus District with Chilehaus	Cultural	1467
Iran	Cultural Landscape of Maymand	Cultural	1423
Iran	Susa	Cultural	1455
Israel	Necropolis of Bet She'arim: A Landmark of Jewish Renewal	Cultural	1471
Italy	Arab-Norman Palermo and the Cathedral Churches of Cefalù and Monreale	Cultural	1487
Jamaica	Blue and John Crow Mountains (F)	Mixed	1356
Japan	Sites of Japan's Meiji Industrial Revolution: Iron and Steel, Shipbuilding and Coal Mining	Cultural	1484
Jordan	Baptism Site 'Bethany Beyond the Jordan' (Al-Maghtas)	Cultural	1446
Mexico	Aqueduct of Padre Tembleque Hydraulic System	Cultural	1463
Mongolia	Great Burkhan Khaldun Mountain and its surrounding sacred landscape	Cultural	1440
Norway	Rjukan–Notodden Industrial Heritage Site	Cultural	1486
Saudi Arabia	Rock Art in the Hail Region of Saudi Arabia	Cultural	1472
Singapore	Singapore Botanic Gardens (F)	Cultural	1483
South Korea	Baekje Historic Areas	Cultural	1477
Turkey	Diyarbakır Fortress and Hevsel Gardens Cultural Landscape	Cultural	1488
Turkey	Ephesus	Cultural	1018
United Kingdom	The Forth Bridge	Cultural	1485
United States	San Antonio Missions	Cultural	1466
Uruguay	Fray Bentos Industrial Landscape	Cultural	1464

== 2016 (40th session) ==
21 sites (12 cultural, 6 natural, 3 mixed)
Host: Turkey

Country	Site	Category	UNESCO Reference no.
Antigua and Barbuda	Antigua Naval Dockyard and Related Archaeological Sites (F)	Cultural	1499
Argentina; Belgium; France; Germany; India; Japan; Switzerland	The Architectural Work of Le Corbusier, an Outstanding Contribution to the Modern Movement	Cultural	1321
Bosnia and Herzegovina; Croatia; Montenegro; Serbia	Stećci Medieval Tombstone Graveyards	Cultural	1504
Brazil	Pampulha Modern Ensemble	Cultural	1493
Canada	Mistaken Point	Natural	1497
Chad	Ennedi Massif: Natural and Cultural Landscape	Mixed	1475
China	Hubei Shennongjia	Natural	1509
China	Zuojiang Huashan Rock Art Cultural Landscape	Cultural	1508
Greece	Archaeological Site of Philippi	Cultural	1517
India	Archaeological Site of Nalanda Mahavihara at Nalanda, Bihar	Cultural	1502
India	Khangchendzonga National Park	Mixed	1513
Iran	Lut Desert	Natural	1505
Iran	The Persian Qanat	Cultural	1506
Iraq	The Ahwar of Southern Iraq: Refuge of Biodiversity and the Relict Landscape of the Mesopotamian Cities	Mixed	1481
Kazakhstan; Kyrgyzstan; Uzbekistan	Western Tien-Shan	Natural	1490
Mexico	Archipiélago de Revillagigedo	Natural	1510
Micronesia	Nan Madol: Ceremonial Centre of Eastern Micronesia (F)	Cultural	1503
Spain	Antequera Dolmens Site	Cultural	1501
Sudan	Sanganeb Marine National Park and Dungonab Bay – Mukkawar Island Marine National Park	Natural	262
Turkey	Archaeological Site of Ani	Cultural	1518
United Kingdom (Gibraltar) (F)	Gorham's Cave Complex	Cultural	1500

== 2017 (41st session) ==
21 sites (18 cultural, 3 natural)
Host: Poland

Country	Site	Category	UNESCO Reference no.
Angola	Mbanza Kongo, Vestiges of the Capital of the former Kingdom of Kongo (F)	Cultural	1511
Argentina	Los Alerces National Park	Natural	1526
Brazil	Valongo Wharf Archaeological Site	Cultural	1548
Cambodia	Temple Zone of Sambor Prei Kuk, Archaeological Site of Ancient Ishanapura	Cultural	1532
China	Kulangsu: a Historic International Settlement	Cultural	1541
China	Qinghai Hoh Xil	Natural	1540
Croatia; Italy; Montenegro	Venetian Works of Defence between the 16th and 17th centuries: Stato da Terra – western Stato da Mar	Cultural	1533
Denmark (Greenland)	Kujataa Greenland: Norse and Inuit Farming at the Edge of the Ice Cap	Cultural	1536
Eritrea	Asmara: a Modernist African City (F)	Cultural	1550
France (French Polynesia) (F)	Taputapuātea	Cultural	1529
Germany	Caves and Ice Age Art in the Swabian Jura	Cultural	1527
India	Historic City of Ahmadabad	Cultural	1551
Iran	Historic City of Yazd	Cultural	1544
Japan	Sacred Island of Okinoshima and Associated Sites in the Munakata Region	Cultural	1535
Mongolia; Russia	Landscapes of Dauria	Natural	1448
Palestine	Hebron / Al-Khalil Old Town	Cultural	1565
Poland	Tarnowskie Góry Lead-Silver-Zinc Mine and its Underground Water Management System	Cultural	1539
Russia	Assumption Cathedral and Monastery of the town-island of Sviyazhsk	Cultural	1525
South Africa	ǂKhomani Cultural Landscape	Cultural	1545
Turkey	Aphrodisias	Cultural	1519
United Kingdom	Lake District National Park	Cultural	422

== 2018 (42nd session) ==
19 sites (13 cultural, 3 natural, 3 mixed)
Host: Bahrain

Country	Site	Category	UNESCO Reference no.
Canada	Pimachiowin Aki	Mixed	1415
China	Fanjingshan	Natural	1559
Colombia	Chiribiquete National Park – 'The Maloca of the Jaguar'	Mixed	1174
Denmark (Greenland)	Aasivissuit – Nipisat. Inuit Hunting Ground between Ice and Sea	Cultural	1557
France	Chaîne des Puys - Limagne fault tectonic arena	Natural	1434
Germany	Archaeological Border complex of Hedeby and the Danevirke	Cultural	1553
Germany	Naumburg Cathedral	Cultural	1470
India	Victorian Gothic and Art Deco Ensembles of Mumbai	Cultural	1480
Iran	Sassanid Archaeological Landscape of Fars Region	Cultural	1568
Italy	Ivrea, Industrial City of the 20th Century	Cultural	1538
Japan	Hidden Christian Sites in the Nagasaki Region	Cultural	1495
Kenya	Thimlich Ohinga Archaeological Site	Cultural	1450
Mexico	Tehuacán-Cuicatlán Valley: originary habitat of Mesoamerica	Mixed	1534
Oman	Ancient City of Qalhat	Cultural	1537
Saudi Arabia	Al-Ahsa Oasis, an Evolving Cultural Landscape	Cultural	1563
South Africa	Barberton Makhonjwa Mountains	Natural	1575
South Korea	Sansa, Buddhist Mountain Monasteries in Korea	Cultural	1562
Spain	Caliphate City of Medina Azahara	Cultural	1560
Turkey	Göbekli Tepe	Cultural	1572

== 2019 (43rd session) ==
29 sites (24 cultural, 4 natural, 1 mixed)
Host: Azerbaijan

Country	Site	Category	UNESCO Reference no.
Australia	Budj Bim Cultural Landscape	Cultural	1577
Azerbaijan	Historic Centre of Sheki with the Khan's Palace	Cultural	1549
Azerbaijan; Iran	Hyrcanian Forests	Natural	1584
Bahrain	Dilmun Burial Mounds	Cultural	1542
Brazil	Paraty and Ilha Grande – Culture and Biodiversity	Mixed	1308
Burkina Faso	Ancient Ferrous Metallurgy Sites of Burkina Faso	Cultural	1602
Canada	Writing-on-Stone / Áísínai'pi	Cultural	1597
China	Archaeological ruins of Liangzhu City	Cultural	1592
China	Migratory Bird Sanctuaries along the Coast of Yellow Sea–Bohai Gulf of China (Phase II)	Natural	1606
Czech Republic	Landscape for Breeding and Training of Ceremonial Carriage Horses at Kladruby nad Labem	Cultural	1589
Czech Republic; Germany	Erzgebirge / Krušnohoří Mining Region	Cultural	1478
France (French Southern and Antarctic Lands) (F)	French Austral Lands and Seas	Natural	1603
Germany	Water Management System of Augsburg	Cultural	1580
Iceland	Vatnajökull National Park – Dynamic Nature of Fire and Ice	Natural	1604
India	Jaipur City, Rajasthan	Cultural	1605
Indonesia	Ombilin Mining Heritage of Sawahlunto	Cultural	1610
Iraq	Babylon	Cultural	278
Italy	Le Colline del Prosecco di Conegliano e Valdobbiadene	Cultural	1571
Japan	Mozu-Furuichi Kofun Group: Mounded Tombs of Ancient Japan	Cultural	1593
Laos	Megalithic Jar Sites in Xiengkhuang - Plain of Jars	Cultural	1587
Myanmar	Bagan	Cultural	1588
Poland	Krzemionki Prehistoric Striped Flint Mining Region	Cultural	1599
Portugal	Royal Building of Mafra – Palace, Basilica, Convent, Cerco Garden and Hunting Park (Tapada)	Cultural	1573
Portugal	Sanctuary of Bom Jesus do Monte in Braga	Cultural	1590
Russia	Churches of the Pskov School of Architecture	Cultural	1523
South Korea	Seowon, Korean Neo-Confucian Academies	Cultural	1498
Spain	Risco Caído and the Sacred Mountains of Gran Canaria Cultural Landscape	Cultural	1578
United Kingdom	Jodrell Bank Observatory	Cultural	1594
United States	The 20th-Century Architecture of Frank Lloyd Wright	Cultural	1496

== 2021 (44th session) ==
The 44th session was originally scheduled for 2020 but postponed to 2021 due to the COVID-19 pandemic. Thus, the World Heritage Committee voted on both 2020 and 2021 nominations.

34 sites (29 cultural, 5 natural)
Host: China

Country	Site	Category	UNESCO Reference no.
Austria; Belgium; Czech Republic; France; Germany; Italy; United Kingdom	The Great Spa Towns of Europe	Cultural	1613
Austria; Germany; Slovakia	Frontiers of the Roman Empire – The Danube Limes (Western Segment)	Cultural	1608
Belgium; Netherlands	Colonies of Benevolence	Cultural	1555
Brazil	Sítio Roberto Burle Marx	Cultural	1620
Chile	Settlement and Artificial Mummification of the Chinchorro Culture in the Arica and Parinacota Region	Cultural	1634
China	Quanzhou: Emporium of the World in Song-Yuan China	Cultural	1561
Côte d'Ivoire	Sudanese style mosques in northern Côte d'Ivoire	Cultural	1648
France	Cordouan Lighthouse	Cultural	1625
France	Nice, Winter Resort Town of the Riviera	Cultural	1635
Gabon	Ivindo National Park	Natural	1653
Georgia	Colchic Rainforests and Wetlands	Natural	1616
Germany	Mathildenhöhe Darmstadt	Cultural	1614
Germany	ShUM Sites of Speyer, Worms and Mainz	Cultural	1636
Germany; Netherlands	Frontiers of the Roman Empire – The Lower German Limes	Cultural	1631
India	Dholavira: a Harappan City	Cultural	1645
India	Kakatiya Rudreshwara (Ramappa) Temple, Telangana	Cultural	1570
Iran	Cultural Landscape of Hawraman / Uramanat	Cultural	1647
Iran	Trans-Iranian Railway	Cultural	1585
Italy	Padua's fourteenth-century fresco cycles	Cultural	1623
Italy	The Porticoes of Bologna	Cultural	1650
Japan	Amami-Ōshima Island, Tokunoshima Island, Northern part of Okinawa Island, and Iriomote Island	Natural	1574
Japan	Jōmon Prehistoric Sites in Northern Japan	Cultural	1632
Jordan	As-Salt - The Place of Tolerance and Urban Hospitality	Cultural	689
Peru	Chankillo Archaeoastronomical Complex	Cultural	1624
Romania	Roșia Montană Mining Landscape	Cultural	1552
Russia	Petroglyphs of Lake Onega and the White Sea	Cultural	1654
Saudi Arabia	Ḥimā Cultural Area	Cultural	1619
Slovenia	The works of Jože Plečnik in Ljubljana – Human Centred Urban Design	Cultural	1643
Spain	Paseo del Prado and Buen Retiro, a landscape of Arts and Sciences	Cultural	1618
South Korea	Getbol, Korean Tidal Flats	Natural	1591
Thailand	Kaeng Krachan Forest Complex	Natural	1461
Turkey	Arslantepe Mound	Cultural	1622
United Kingdom	The Slate Landscape of Northwest Wales	Cultural	1633
Uruguay	The work of engineer Eladio Dieste: Church of Atlántida	Cultural	1612

== 2023 (18th extraordinary session) ==
At its 18th extraordinary session in January 2023, the World Heritage Committee added three sites under an emergency procedure to both the World Heritage List and the List of World Heritage in Danger.

3 sites (3 cultural)
Host: France

Country	Site	Category	UNESCO Reference no.
Lebanon	Rachid Karami International Fair-Tripoli	Cultural	1702
Ukraine	The Historic Centre of Odesa	Cultural	1703
Yemen	Landmarks of the Ancient Kingdom of Saba, Marib	Cultural	1700

== 2023 (45th session) ==
The 45th session was originally scheduled to be held from 19 June to 30 June, 2022, in Kazan, Russia, but was postponed indefinitely due to the Russian invasion of Ukraine. The World Heritage Committee then rescheduled the 45th session to 10-25 September 2023 in Riyadh, Saudi Arabia, voted on 2022 and 2023 nominations.

42 sites (33 cultural, 9 natural)
Host: Saudi Arabia

Country	Site	Category	UNESCO Reference no.
Argentina	ESMA Museum and Site of Memory – Former Clandestine Center of Detention, Torture and Extermination	Cultural	1681
Azerbaijan	Cultural Landscape of Khinalig People and “Köç Yolu” Transhumance Route	Cultural	1696
Belgium; France	Funerary and memory sites of the First World War (Western Front)	Cultural	1567
Cambodia	Koh Ker: Archeological Site of Ancient Lingapura or Chok Gargyar	Cultural	1667
Canada	Anticosti	Natural	1686
Canada	Tr'ondëk-Klondike	Cultural	1564
China	Cultural Landscape of Old Tea Forests of the Jingmai Mountain in Pu'er	Cultural	1665
Congo	Forest Massif of Odzala-Kokoua	Natural	692
Czech Republic	Žatec and the Landscape of Saaz Hops	Cultural	1558
Denmark	Viking-Age Ring Fortresses	Cultural	1660
Ethiopia	Bale Mountains National Park	Natural	111
Ethiopia	The Gedeo Cultural Landscape	Cultural	1641
France	The Maison Carrée of Nîmes	Cultural	1569
France (Martinique) (F)	Volcanoes and Forests of Mount Pelée and the Pitons of Northern Martinique	Natural	1657
Germany	Jewish-Medieval Heritage of Erfurt	Cultural	1656
Greece	Zagori Cultural Landscape	Cultural	1695
Guatemala	National Archaeological Park Tak'alik Ab'aj	Cultural	1663
India	Sacred Ensembles of the Hoysalas	Cultural	1670
India	Santiniketan	Cultural	1375
Indonesia	The Cosmological Axis of Yogyakarta and its Historic Landmarks	Cultural	1671
Iran	The Persian Caravanserai	Cultural	1668
Italy	Evaporitic Karst and Caves of Northern Apennines	Natural	1692
Kazakhstan; Turkmenistan; Uzbekistan	Cold Winter Deserts of Turan	Natural	1693
Latvia	Old town of Kuldīga	Cultural	1658
Lithuania	Modernist Kaunas: Architecture of Optimism, 1919-1939	Cultural	1661
Mongolia	Deer Stone Monuments and Related Bronze Age Sites	Cultural	1621
Netherlands	Eisinga Planetarium in Franeker	Cultural	1683
Palestine	Ancient Jericho/Tell es-Sultan	Cultural	1687
Russia	Astronomical Observatories of Kazan Federal University	Cultural	1678
Rwanda	Memorial sites of the Genocide: Nyamata, Murambi, Gisozi and Bisesero	Cultural	1586
Rwanda	Nyungwe National Park (F)	Natural	1697
Saudi Arabia	'Uruq Bani Ma'arid	Natural	1699
South Korea	Gaya Tumuli	Cultural	1666
Spain	Prehistoric Sites of Talayotic Menorca	Cultural	1528
Suriname	Jodensavanne Archaeological Site: Jodensavanne Settlement and Cassipora Creek Cemetery	Cultural	1680
Tajikistan	Tugay forests of the Tigrovaya Balka Nature Reserve	Natural	1685
Tajikistan; Turkmenistan; Uzbekistan	Silk Roads: Zarafshan-Karakum Corridor	Cultural	1675
Thailand	The Ancient Town of Si Thep and its Associated Dvaravati Monuments	Cultural	1662
Tunisia	Djerba: Testimony to a settlement pattern in an island territory	Cultural	1640
Turkey	Gordion	Cultural	1669
Turkey	Wooden Hypostyle Mosques of Medieval Anatolia	Cultural	1694
United States	Hopewell Ceremonial Earthworks	Cultural	1689

== 2024 (46th session) ==
46th session was held in New Delhi, India

24 Sites (19 cultural, 4 natural, 1 mixed).

Host: India

Country	Site	Category	UNESCO Reference no.
Bosnia and Herzegovina	Vjetrenica Cave, Ravno	Natural	1673
Brazil	Lençóis Maranhenses National Park	Natural	1611
Burkina Faso	Royal Court of Tiébélé	Cultural	1713
China	Badain Jaran Desert – Towers of Sand and Lakes	Natural	1638
China	Beijing Central Axis: A Building Ensemble Exhibiting the Ideal Order of the Chinese Capital	Cultural	1714
Ethiopia	Melka Kunture and Balchit: Archaeological and Palaeontological Sites in the Highland Area of Ethiopia	Cultural	13
France (French Polynesia)	Te Henua Enata – The Marquesas Islands	Mixed	1707
Germany	Herrnhut Moravian Church Settlement	Cultural	1468bis-002
Germany	Schwerin Residence Ensemble	Cultural	1705
India	Moidams – the Mound-Burial System of the Ahom Dynasty	Cultural	1711
Iran	Hegmataneh	Cultural	1716
Italy	Via Appia. Regina Viarum	Cultural	1708
Japan	Sado Island Gold Mines	Cultural	1698
Jordan	Umm Al-Jimāl	Cultural	1721
Kenya	The Historic Town and Archaeological Site of Gedi	Cultural	1720
Malaysia	The Archaeological Heritage of Niah National Park’s Caves Complex	Cultural	1014
Palestine	Saint Hilarion Monastery/Tell Umm Amer	Cultural	1749
Romania	Frontiers of the Roman Empire - Dacia	Cultural	1718
Romania	Brâncusi Monumental Ensemble of Târgu Jiu	Cultural	1473
Russia	Cultural Landscape of Kenozero Lake	Cultural	1688
Saudi Arabia	The Cultural Landscape of Al-Faw Archaeological Area	Cultural	1712
South Africa	Human Rights, Liberation and Reconciliation: Nelson Mandela Legacy Sites	Cultural	1676
South Africa	The Emergence of Modern Human Behaviour: The Pleistocene Occupation Sites of South Africa	Cultural	1723
Thailand	Phu Phrabat, a testimony to the Sīma stone tradition of the Dvaravati period	Cultural	1507
United Kingdom	The Flow Country	Natural	1722
United Kingdom	Gracehill Moravian Church Settlement	Cultural	1468bis-004
United States	Bethlehem Moravian Church Settlement	Cultural	1468bis-003

== 2025 (47th session) ==
The 47th session was originally scheduled to be held in July in Sofia, Bulgaria, but was moved to Paris, France.

26 Sites (21 cultural, 4 natural, 1 mixed).

Host: France

Country	Site	Category	UNESCO Reference no.
Australia	Murujuga Cultural Landscape	Cultural	1709
Brazil	Cavernas do Peruaçu National Park	Natural	1747
Cambodia	Cambodian Memorial Sites: From centres of repression to places of peace and reflection	Cultural	1748
Cameroon	Diy-Gid-Biy Cultural Landscape of the Mandara Mountains	Cultural	1745
China	Xixia Imperial Tombs	Cultural	1736
Denmark	Møns Klint	Natural	1728
France	Megaliths of Carnac and of the shores of Morbihan	Cultural	1725
Germany	The Palaces of King Ludwig II of Bavaria: Neuschwanstein, Linderhof, Schachen and Herrenchiemsee	Cultural	1726
Greece	Minoan Palatial Centres	Cultural	1733
Guinea-Bissau	Coastal and Marine Ecosystems of the Bijagós Archipelago – Omatí Minhô (F)	Natural	1431
India	Maratha Military Landscapes of India	Cultural	1739
Iran	The Prehistoric Sites of the Khorramabad Valley	Cultural	1744
Italy	Funerary Tradition in the Prehistory of Sardinia – The domus de janas	Cultural	1730
Jamaica	The Archaeological Ensemble of 17th Century Port Royal	Cultural	1595
Malawi	Mount Mulanje Cultural Landscape	Cultural	1201
Malaysia	Forest Research Institute Malaysia Forest Park Selangor	Cultural	1734
Mexico	Wixárika Route through Sacred Sites to Wirikuta (Tatehuarí Huajuyé)	Cultural	1704
North Korea	Mount Kumgang – Diamond Mountain from the Sea	Mixed	1642
Panama	The Colonial Transisthmian Route of Panamá	Cultural	1582
Russia	Rock Paintings of Shulgan-Tash Cave	Cultural	1743
Sierra Leone	Gola-Tiwai Complex (F)	Natural	1746
South Korea	Petroglyphs along the Bangucheon Stream	Cultural	1740
Tajikistan	Cultural Heritage Sites of Ancient Khuttal	Cultural	1627
Turkey	Sardis and the Lydian Tumuli of Bin Tepe	Cultural	1731
United Arab Emirates	Faya Palaeolandscape	Cultural	1735
Vietnam	Yen Tu-Vinh Nghiem-Con Son, Kiep Bac Complex of Monuments and Landscapes	Cultural	1732

== 2026 (48th session) ==
The 48th session was held in Busan, on 19–29 July 2026.

Host: South Korea

25 Sites (19 cultural, 5 natural, 1 mixed).

Country	Site	Category	UNESCO Reference no.
Brazil	Amazonia Theaters	Cultural	1774
China	Jingdezhen Handicraft Porcelain Industry Sites	Cultural	1765
Comoros	Historical Sultanates of the Comoros (F)	Cultural	1768
Denmark	The Bony Fish Fossils of the Western Limfjord – Evolution and Climate Adaptation in the Earliest Eocene	Natural	1758
Finland	Aalto Works	Cultural	1752
France	Beaches of the D-Day Landings, Normandy, 1944	Cultural	1581
France	Royal Capetian Fortresses of Languedoc	Cultural	1755
Greece	The wider area of Mount Olympus	Mixed	1719
India	Ancient Buddhist Site of Sarnath	Cultural	927
Iran	Alamūt Castle and Related Fortifications	Cultural	1770
Italy	The system of Italian-style condominio theatres of the 18th and 19th centuries in Central Italy	Cultural	1762
Japan	Ancient Capitals of Asuka and Fujiwara	Cultural	1757
Jordan	Aqaba Marine Reserve	Natural	1742
Kazakhstan	Rocky Mosques of Mangyshlak Peninsula	Cultural	1760
Lebanon	Mount Amel Castles	Cultural	1810
Mongolia	The Cemetery Complexes of the Xiongnu Nobility	Cultural	1759
Palestine	Sebastia	Cultural	1809
Poland	Gdynia Modernist City Centre	Cultural	1715
Sao Tome and Principe	The Roças of Sao Tome and Principe: Colonial Agricultural System and Forced Migration (F)	Cultural	1750
South Korea	Getbol, Korean Tidal Flats (Phase II)	Natural	1591
South Sudan	Boma-Badingilo Migratory Landscape (F)	Natural	1808
Thailand	Wat Phra Mahathat Woramahawihan, Nakhon Si Thammarat	Cultural	1761
Tunisia	Village of Sidi Bou Saïd	Cultural	1769
United Arab Emirates	Wadi Wurayah	Natural	1724
United States	Okefenokee National Wildlife Refuge	Natural	1751
Uzbekistan	Tashkent Modernist Architecture. Modernity and Tradition in Central Asia	Cultural	1766

== See also ==
- Former UNESCO World Heritage Sites
- List of World Heritage in Danger
- Lists of World Heritage Sites
