= The Colonial Transisthmian Route of Panamá =

UNESCO World Heritage Site
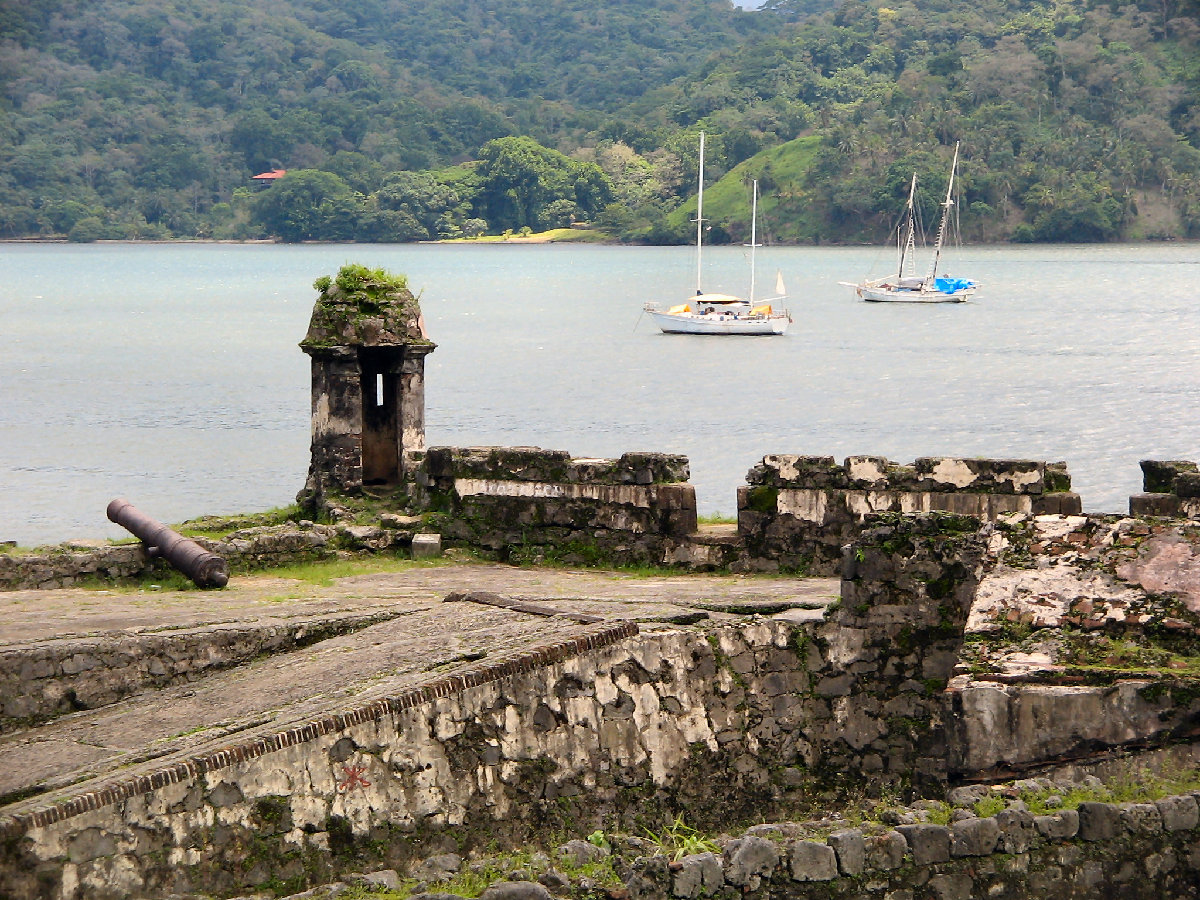
- Interactive map of The Colonial Transisthmian Route of Panamá
- Location: Panama
- Criteria: ii, iv
- Reference: 1582rev
- Inscription: 2025 (47th Session)

The Colonial Transisthmian Route of Panamá is a World Heritage Site located in Panama. It consists of six areas. Among them, Panama City and the fortifications of Portobelo and San Lorenzo are also part of the site inscribed on the World Heritage List in 1980. The other areas include the Camino de Cruces (in two sections) and the Camino Real. These routes formed part of the network of roads built by the Spanish between the 16th and 19th centuries to connect the Atlantic and Pacific Oceans.
