= Fortifications on the Caribbean Side of Panama: Portobelo-San Lorenzo =

World Heritage Site in Panama

- Fortificaciones de la costa caribe de Panamá
- Portobelo and Fort San Lorenzo, Panama
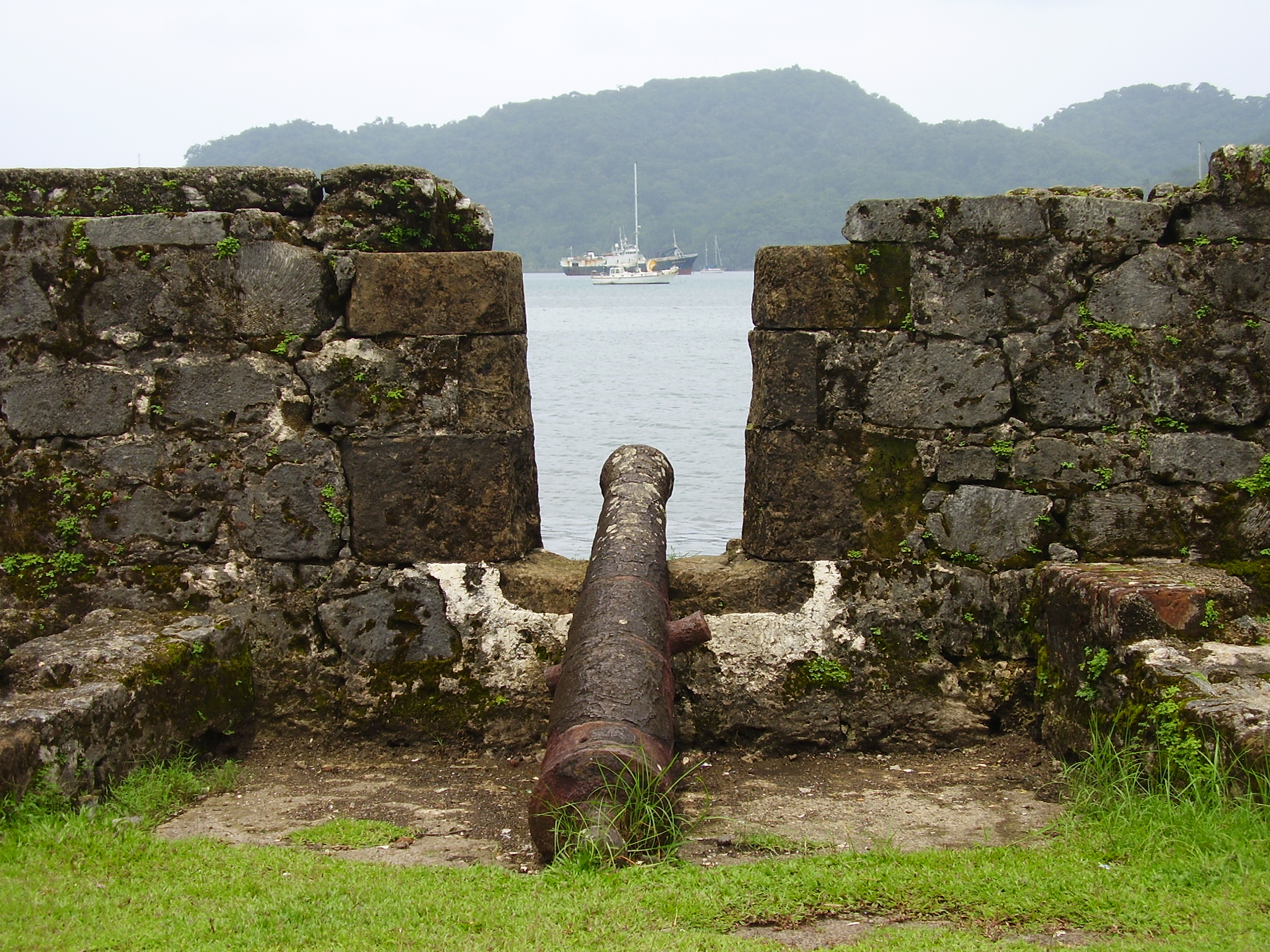
- The ruins of fort San Lorenzo at Portobelo.

Location
- Fort San Lorenzo at Portobelo
- Coordinates: 9.555°N 79.655°W

Site history
- Built: 17th and 18th century
- Built by: Spanish Empire

UNESCO World Heritage Site
- Official name: Fortifications on the Caribbean Side of Panama: Portobelo-San Lorenzo
- Type: Cultural
- Criteria: (i) (iv)
- Designated: 1980 (4th session)
- Reference no.: 135
- Region: Latin America and the Caribbean

The fortifications on the Caribbean Side of Panama: Portobelo-San Lorenzo are military constructions, built by the Spanish Empire during the 17th and 18th centuries on the Caribbean coastline of Colón Province in Panama. The ruins are located on the coast of the province of Colón. In view of their cultural importance, the sites have been inscribed by UNESCO in 1980 as a World Heritage Site under Criteria (i) and (iv), with the description, "Magnificent examples of 17th- and 18th-century military architecture, these Panamanian forts on the Caribbean coast form part of the defence system built by the Spanish Crown to protect transatlantic trade."

== Location ==
The Portobelo and San Lorenzo fortifications are situated approximately 80 kilometres (50 mi) from each other on Panama's Atlantic coast. Portobelo's military structures provided a security cover on the Caribbean part of the Panama harbour whereas the fortifications at San Lorenzo protected the Chagres River at its mouth. The port was built as an alternate Caribbean terminal to the one at Nombre de Dios to navigate through the Isthmus of Panama. The primary purpose was to avoid the land route which was affected during the rainy months. The Chagres River-Cruces access was a combination of the waterway and terrestrial route built as an alternative to the approach to Portobelo via Camino Real and Panama City..The Fortifications on the Caribbean Side of Panama: Portobello – San Lorenzo were found by the Spanish Empire.

== Background ==
In 1502, Christopher Columbus was caught in a severe storm in the sea, and forced to land in a village on the Isthmus of Panama. According to legend, he named it Puerto Bello (Beautiful Port). In 1586, Juan Bautista Antonelli prepared the plans for the first of the fortifications to secure entry to the Bay of Portobelo and the mouth of the Chagres River, and constructed the same by the 1590s. The town of San Felipe de Portobelo, however, was established on 20 March 1597. Over the centuries, Portobelo developed into a strategic Spanish establishment in the New World as it was well-linked with a stone paved road to Panama city. The port's importance as a key transshipment location for the Spanish Conquistadors was to temporarily stack the plundered loot of gold and silver from the Incan mines. They transported the looted treasure on donkey caravans from the Pacific side of the Isthmus of Panama to Portobelo on the Caribbean side, before finally shipping it to the king of Spain.

== History ==
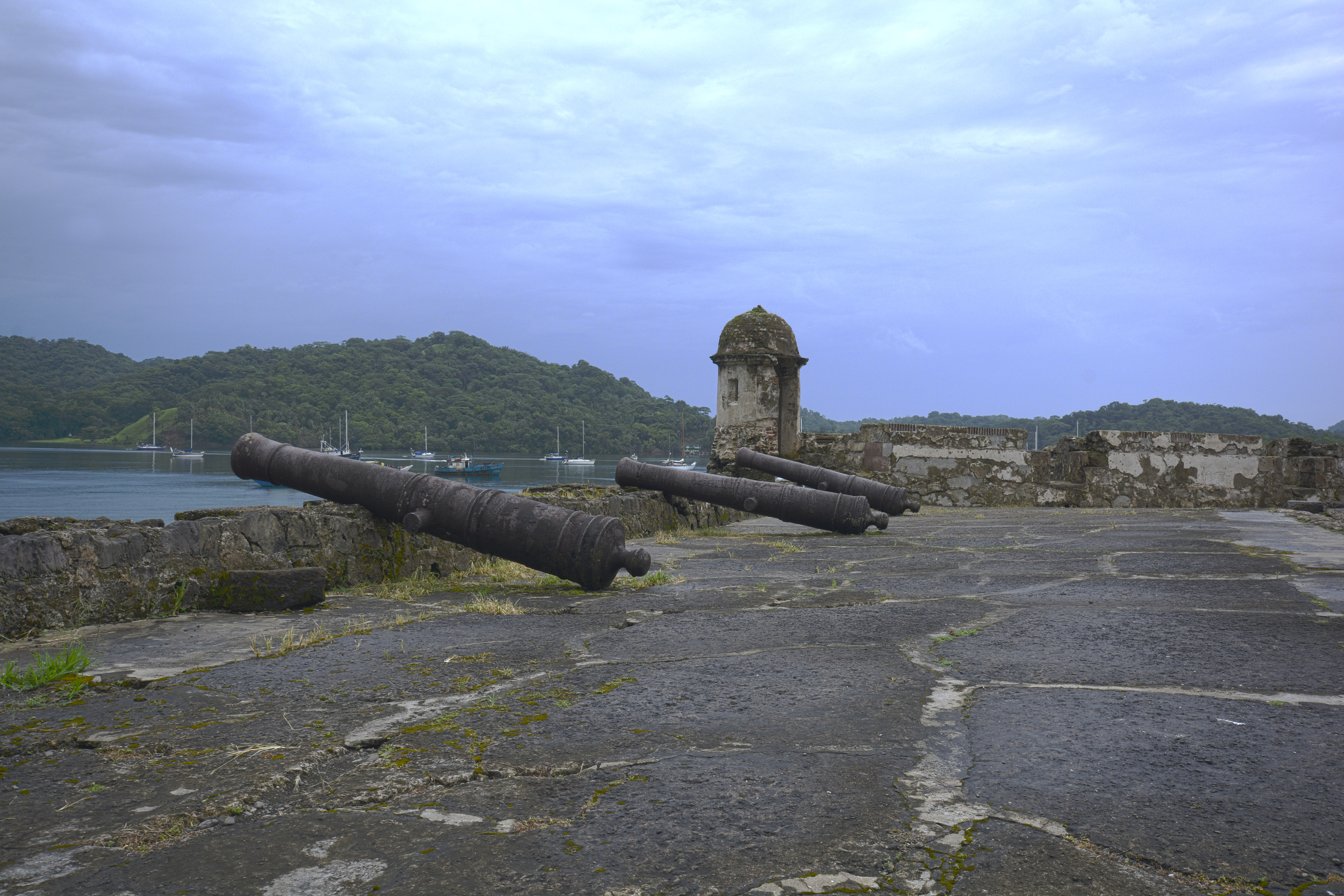
Lower battery of San Fernando

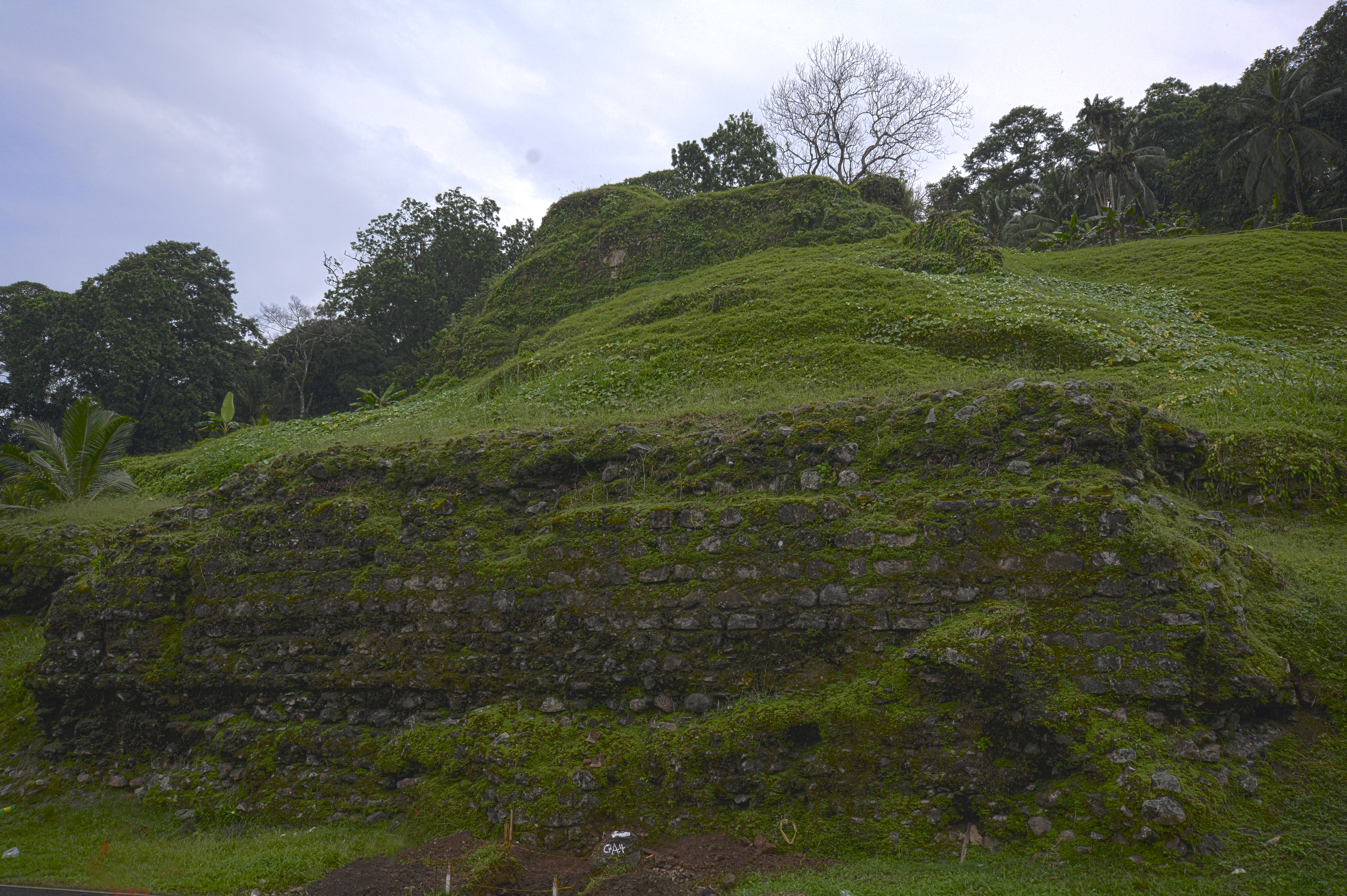
Upper battery of San Fernando

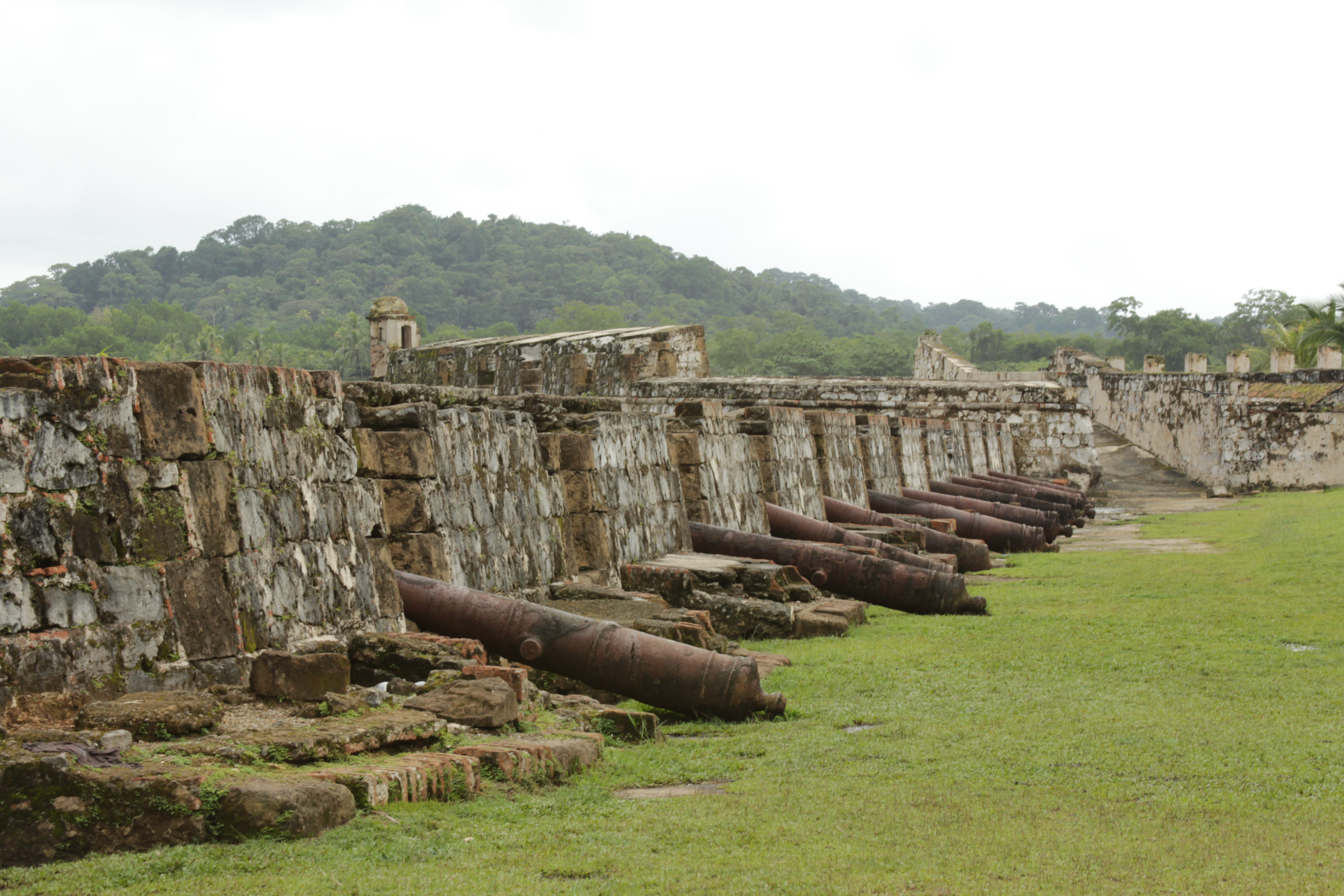
San Jerónimo Fort

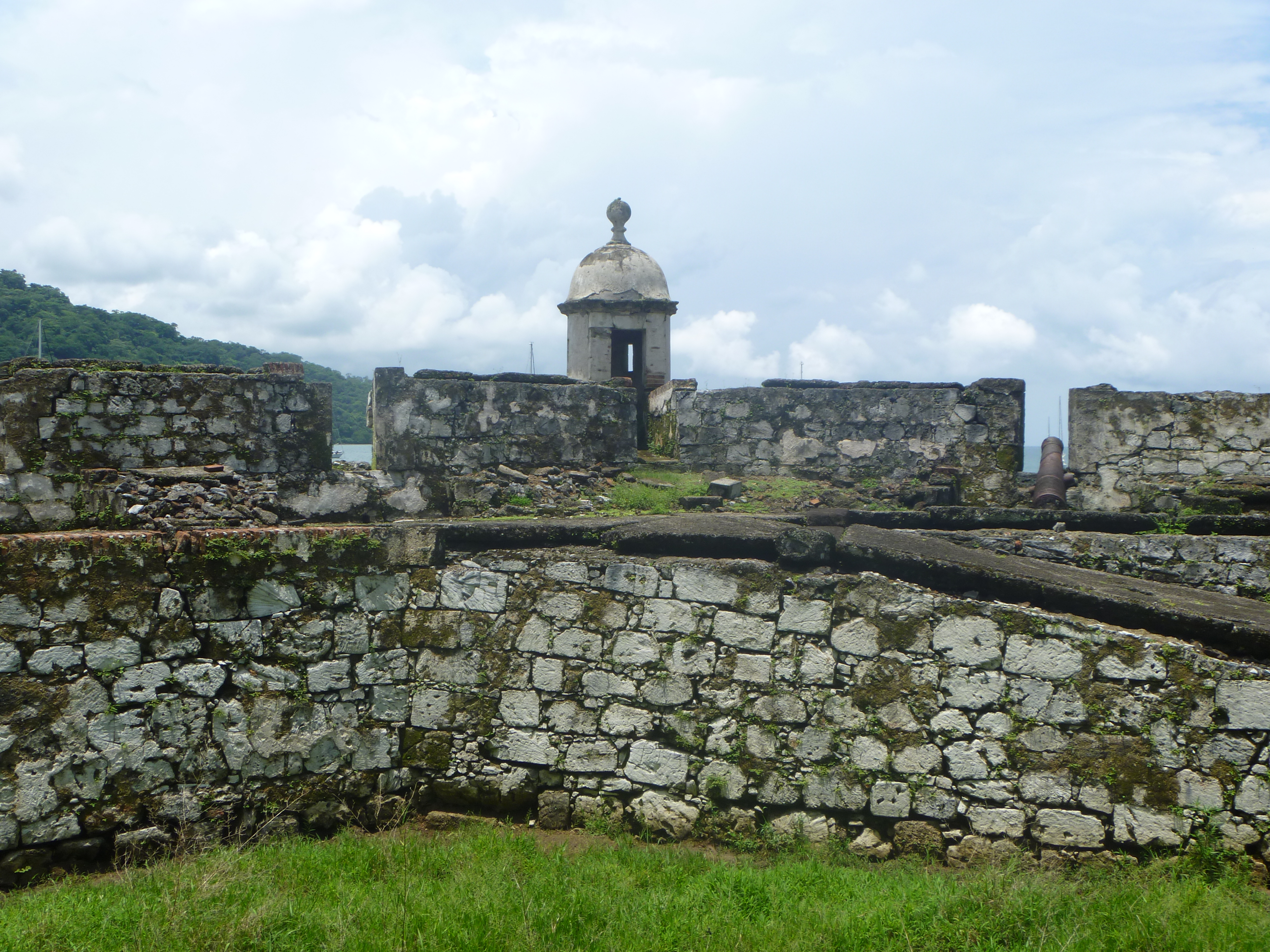
Santiago de la Gloria

Santiago de la Gloria Battery

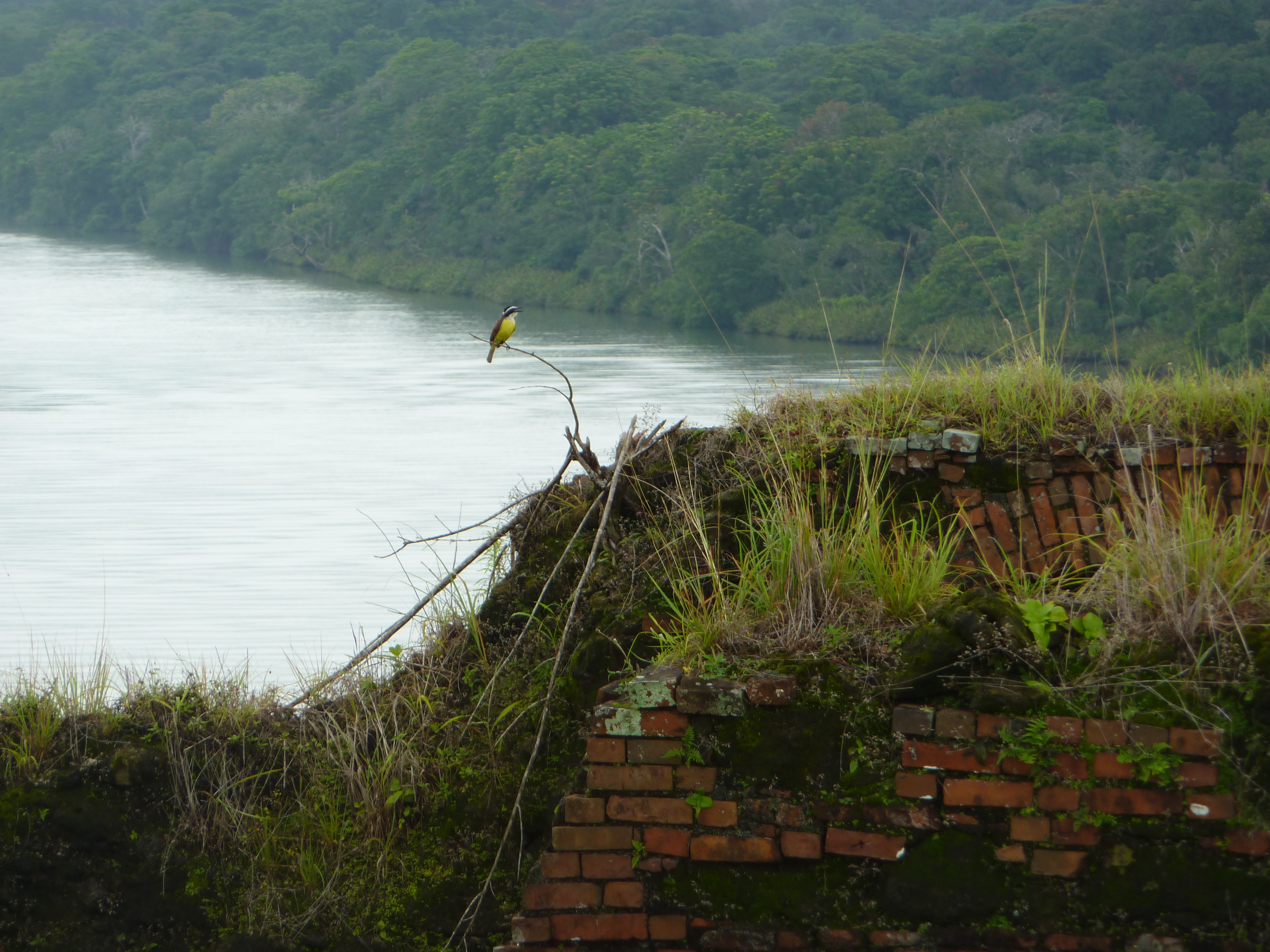
San Lorenzo el Real del Chagres

As the village's importance grew, security concerns were addressed by building military fortifications from 1600 till the last fortifications at Santiago and Fernando on the bay in 1753. In all, 10 different fortifications were built on the hills behind Portobelo port, making it the "most heavily fortified Spanish coastal control point in the Americas". Many of the fortifications were attacked and crumbled to heaps of rubble; only the fortifications built in 1753 have survived in good condition, as Admiral Vernon bypassed Portobello during the last battle. Earlier, Sir Francis Drake was unsuccessful in attacking the fort as he succumbed to fever and was buried in the bay. But he had burned Nombre De Dios in 1596. His lead casket buried in the sea bears his name. In 1597, after Drake's episode, the Spanish Empire decided to fortify the port as the treasury was moved to Portobelo. Fort San Felipe was built first at the entrance to the harbour and was fortified with 35 canons. Fort San Jeronimo was built on the eastern part, and Fort Santiago de la Gloria, on the western part of the bay. These forts were built with coral stones walls, which are as strong as granite. In 1668, the Welsh Buccaneer Sir Henry Morgan attacked Portobelo, using ladders wide enough to carry 3 men abreast to scale the walls of the fortifications. For a month the pirates occupied the city, but no substantial damage to the defensive structures was reported. In 1688 English Pirate Bartholomew Sharp and French buccaneer La Sound attacked the fortifications and caused different degrees of damage. Attacks in 1744 spared the forts but the customs house was severely damaged.

For more than two centuries after the last fortifications were built in 1753, there was total neglect of the forts and battlements resulting in vegetation overgrowth, till the Government of Panama decided to restore them. After Panama became an independent country, Spain abandoned the San Lorenzo Fort in 1821. Following the merger of Panama with Colombia, the fort was used as a prison. Then it was the Post Office for delivery of mail from Britain to Latin America. At Chagres town and below the fort and on the west bank of the Chagres River it was a haven for the adventurers of the 1849 California Gold Rush. With the advent of the railroad in 1850, the importance of Chagres River inter-ocean route diminished.

In July 2012, the UNESCO World Heritage Committee placed Portobelo and nearby Fort San Lorenzo on the List of World Heritage in Danger, due to environmental concerns, inadequate maintenance, and unchecked urban developments. earlier in 1989, UNESCO had inscribed the site as cultural heritage under criteria (i) and (iv) under the List of World Heritage Sites.

Under Panama's legal framework these fortifications are protected by Law 14/1982, updated by Law 58/2003 legislation related to heritage. The historical structures found underwater is covered under Law 32/2003.

== Architecture ==
The Bay of Portobelo has many fortifications, which replicate European designs of military architecture, built during the colonial period (1596–99). The structures built in the earlier years were in medieval style (Antonelli's Spanish designs). However, in the 18th century, the structures were built by renovating neo-classical features (of Salas and Hernandez (1753–60)), as seen at the Santiago Fort, San Jeronimo Fort and San Fernando Fort, and the San Lorenzo Fort. The custom-house which was damaged in 1744, has been rebuilt and is used now as a museum. The guns which were spiked during various attacks to prevent future use are rusting with the wooden carriages having rotted and been removed. However, the forts are in a well-preserved condition.

The San Fernando fortifications include:

- Lower Battery, Upper Battery and Hilltop Stronghold
- San Jerónimo Battery Fort

The Santiago fortifications include:

- Castle of Santiago de la Gloria ("Gloria Castle"), Battery and Hilltop Stronghold
- Old Santiago Fortress
- Ruins of the Castillo del Hierro (Iron Castle)
- La Trinchera site
- Buenaventura Battery
- San Cristóbal site

The Chagres River site includes:

- San Lorenzo Castle (originally "San Lorenzo el Real del Charge")
- Upper Battery

== Gallery ==
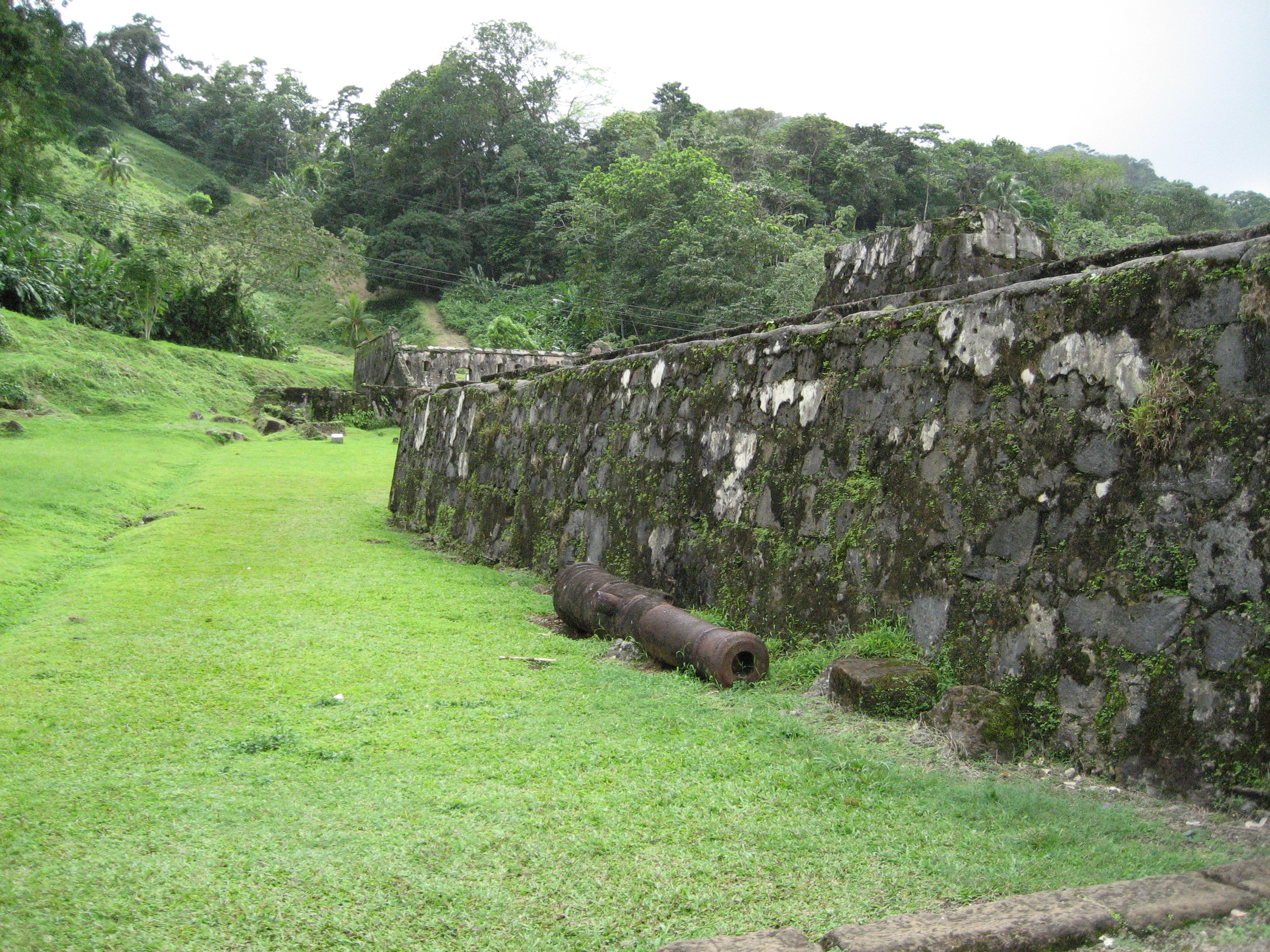
Ruins

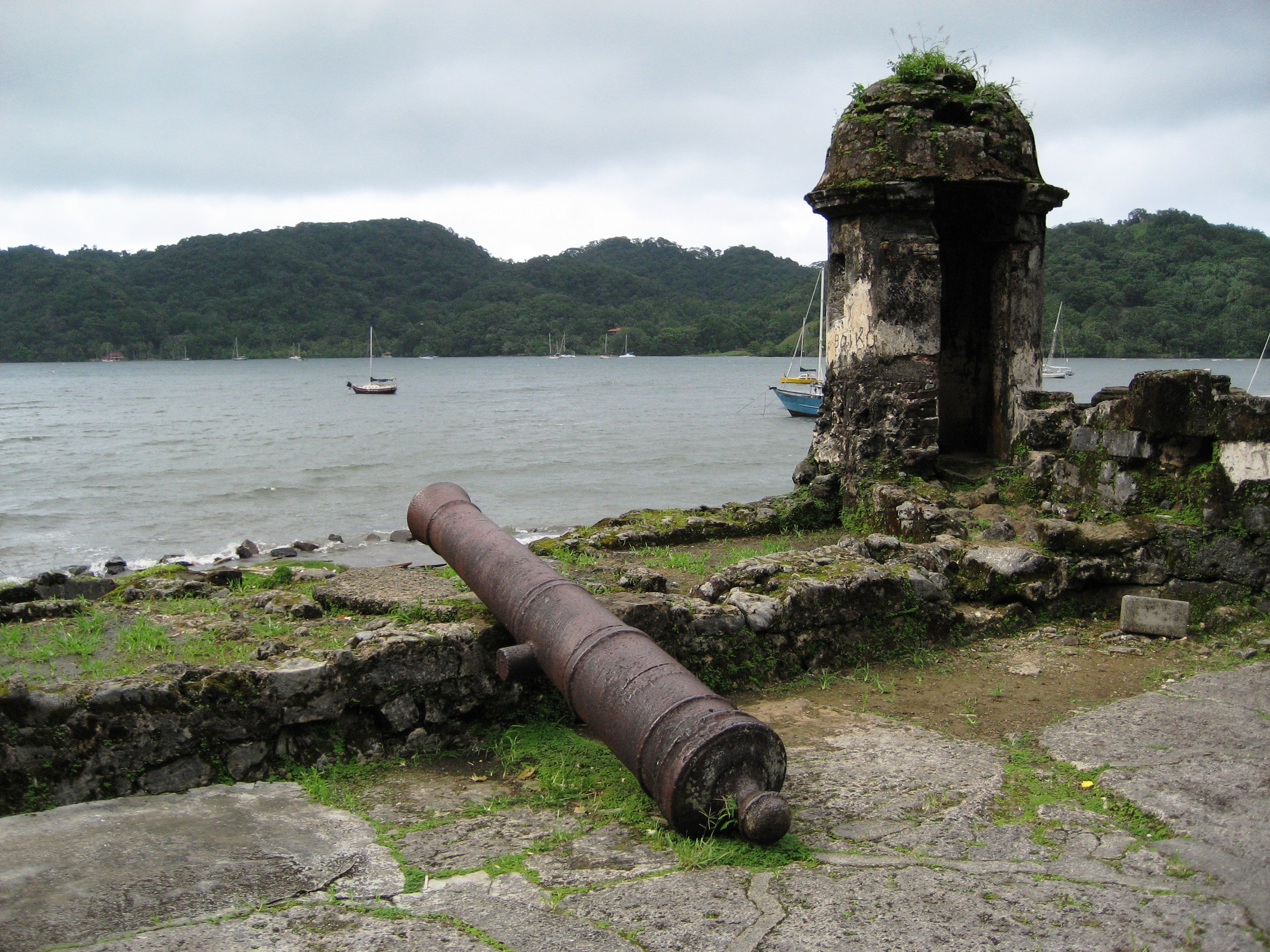
Cannon

== Bibliography ==
- Katzman, Patricia (1 November 2005). Panama. Hunter Publishing, Inc. ISBN 978-1-58843-529-3.
- Showker, Kay; Brennan, Mary (1 May 2008). Caribbean Ports of Call: Eastern and Southern Regions: A Guide for Today's Cruise Passengers. Globe Pequot Press. ISBN 978-0-7627-4538-8.
- Ward, Christopher (1993). Imperial Panama: Commerce and Conflict in Isthmian America, 1550-1800. University of New Mexico Press.
- Whitney, Tisha (1982). Cruising World. ISSN 0098-3519.
- Woods, Sarah (15 August 2009). Panama. Bradt Travel Guides. ISBN 978-1-84162-260-6.
