= Southwestern Arabian foothills savanna =

Desert and xeric shrubland ecoregion of the southern Arabian Peninsula

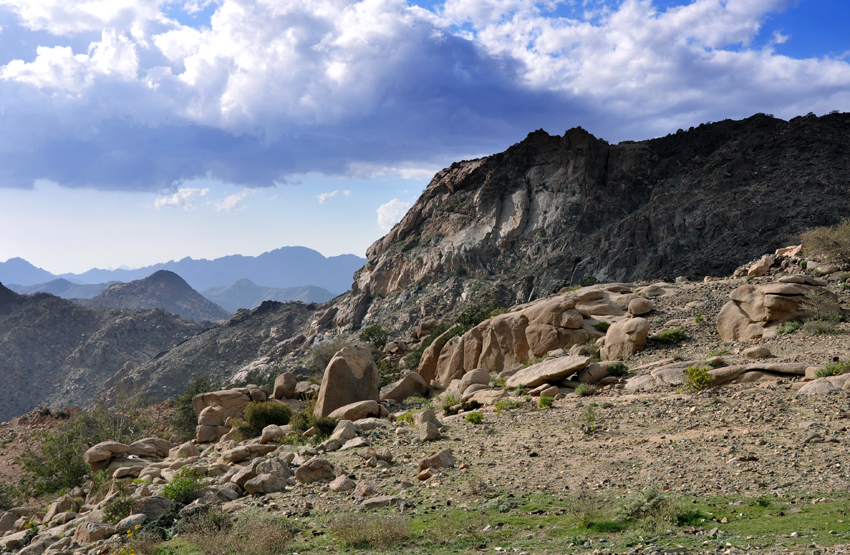
- Landscape south of Ta'if, Saudi Arabia

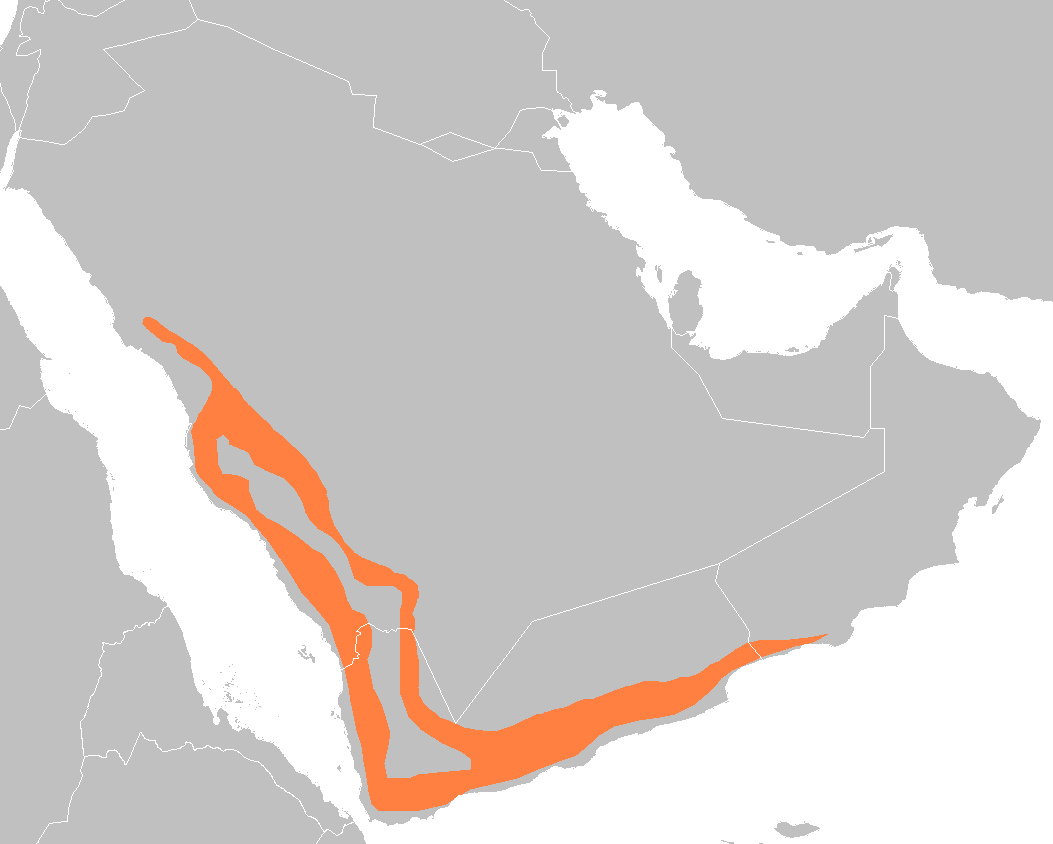
- Map of the Southwestern Arabian foothills savanna

Ecology
- Realm: Afrotropical
- Biome: deserts and xeric shrublands
- Borders: Arabian Peninsula coastal fog desert; Red Sea Nubo-Sindian tropical desert and semi-desert, Southwestern Arabian montane woodlands; South Arabian fog woodlands, shrublands, and dune

Geography
- Area: 275,270 km^{2} (106,280 sq mi)
- Countries: Oman; Saudi Arabia, Yemen

Conservation
- Conservation status: critical/endangered
- Protected: 1.37%

The Southwestern Arabian foothills savanna, also known as the Southwestern Arabian Escarpment shrublands and woodlands, is a desert and xeric shrubland ecoregion of the southern Arabian Peninsula, covering portions of Saudi Arabia, Yemen, and Oman.

== Geography ==
The ecoregion occupies moderate elevations in the peninsula's mountainous southwest, which include regions such as the Hejaz.

The foothills savanna is bounded on the west and south by the Arabian Peninsula coastal fog desert, which extend along the coastal strip between the foothills and the Red Sea and Gulf of Aden. At about 2000 meters elevation, the foothills savanna transitions to the Southwestern Arabian montane woodlands. The drier Red Sea Nubo-Sindian tropical desert and semi-desert lies to the northwest along the Red Sea coast, and wraps around the north and east between the foothill savanna and the hyper-arid Arabian Desert ecoregion of Central Arabia.

The mountains rise from the Red Sea and Gulf of Aden in a series of escarpments. The highest peaks are the Southwest Yemen mountains, which generally diminish in height to the north (towards Hejaz (in modern-day Saudi Arabia)) and east (towards Dhofar in modern-day Oman)). The rocks are generally Precambrian, and include granite, gneiss, and schist. In places they are overlain by areas of younger volcanic rock, known as harrats. In Hadhramaut and Dhofar, the terrain is mostly sedimentary, including limestones, sandstones, bauxite and conglomerates over a base of older Precambrian igneous and metamorphic rocks.

== Climate ==
The climate is tropical to subtropical and semi-arid. Average annual rainfall is generally 250 mm or less, and with areas of higher rainfall in the southeastern mountains. Marine upwelling along the Arabian Sea coast chills the air above sea's surface, creating fog during the summer months that cools and provides moisture to southeastward-facing mountain slopes in Dhofar and southern Yemen.

== Flora ==
The principal plant communities include drought-deciduous open thorn woodlands, drought-deciduous woodlands, evergreen woodlands, shrublands, and dry grasslands. The vegetation varies with elevation, rainfall, and soils, and has been extensively altered by livestock grazing and human use.

Acacia-Commiphora woodlands predominate up to 1000 meters elevation. They consist of drought-deciduous open woodlands and thorn scrub, with species of the genera Acacia and Commiphora predominant. On east-facing slopes, Commiphora is often absent, and species of Acacia predominate. Characteristic trees of these lower-elevation woodlands include Vachellia flava, Vachellia abyssinica, Vachellia etbaica, Senegalia hamulosa, Senegalia mellifera, Vachellia tortilis, Commiphora kataf, Commiphora myrrha, Commiphora kua, and Commiphora gileadensis. Other trees and shrubs include Euphorbia cuneata, Euphorbia triaculeata, Grewia tenax, Hibiscus micranthus, Maytenus senegalensis, Melhania denhami, Dobera glabra, Aloe spp., Cadaba farinosa, Boscia arabica, Adenium obesum, Barleria spp., Boswellia carteri, Maerua crassifolia, and Sterculia africana.

On certain seaward-facing slopes facing the Arabian Sea, moisture-bearing winds from the Arabian Sea create orographic precipitation and frequent fog. The higher humidity sustains semi-deciduous woodlands between 500 and 900 meters elevation, dominated by the endemic tree Terminalia dhofarica, together with Carissa edulis, Dodonaea viscosa, Euclea racemosa subsp. schimperi, Olea europaea subsp. cuspidata, and Searsia somalensis. These subhumid woodlands, shrublands, and coastal dunes are found in the Ureys (or Areys) range in southwestern Yemen, the Hadramaut mountains in southeastern Yemen, and the Dhofar Mountains in southwestern Oman. Some authors classify these distinctive subhumid woodlands and shrublands as a separate ecoregion, the South Arabian fog woodlands, shrublands, and dune.

Acacia-Commiphora woodlands continue up to 1800 meters elevation, and these higher-elevation woodlands are characterized by Senegalia asak, S. etbaica, Vachellia tortilis, Commiphora gileadensis, C. myrrha, Moringa peregrina, Searsia tripartita, Dobera glabra, Euphorbia cuneata, Grewia villosa, Cadia purpurea, Carissa edulis, Cordia abyssinica, and Terminalia brownii.

Seasonal watercourses, or wadis, are lined with Breonadia salicina, Cordia abyssinica, Ficus vasta, and Mimusops laurifolia. In a few sheltered wadis with year-round moisture on the western slopes of the escarpment, including Jabal Fayfa, Mimusops laurifolia, an evergreen tree, has grown to great age and large size, and these trees are the largest in Saudi Arabia.

Semi-evergreen woodlands of Barbeya oleoides and Olea europaea are found between 1800 and 2200 meters elevation, and form the transition between the Acacia-Commiphora woodlands at lower elevations and the high-elevation Juniper woodlands of Southwestern Arabian montane woodlands ecoregion.

The flora of the ecoregion has many affinities to that of tropical East Africa. Acacia-Commiphora woodlands are characteristic of the dry East African lowlands and foothills, and the Southwestern Arabian woodlands and savannas share many species. Southwestern Arabia's high-elevation forests and humid forests at lower elevations share many Afromontane species with the high mountains of Eastern Africa.

== Fauna ==
The ecoregion is home to the critically-endangered Arabian leopard (Panthera pardus nimr). Other mammals include the caracal (Caracal caracal), Arabian wolf (Canis lupus arabs), hamadryas baboon (Papio hamadryas), red fox (Vulpes vulpes), long-tailed jird (Meriones crassus), Cape hare (Lepus capensis), and Indian crested porcupine (Hystrix indica).

Several species of birds are endemic to the mountains of southwestern Arabia. They include Philby's partridge (Alectoris philbyi), Yemen warbler (Curruca buryi), Yemen thrush (Turdus menachensis), Arabian accentor (Prunella fagani), Arabian waxbill (Estrilda rufibarba), Yemen serin (Crithagra menachensis), and Yemen linnet (Linaria yemenensis). Other native bird species with a wider range include the Arabian partridge (Alectoris melanocephala), Arabian woodpecker (Dendrocopos dorae), Arabian wheatear (Oenanthe lugentoides), Arabian golden sparrow (Passer euchlorus), Arabian warbler (Curruca leucomelaena), Arabian serin (Crithagra rothschildi), and Arabian golden-winged grosbeak (Rhynchostruthus percivali).

Scortecci's toad (Bufo scorteccii) is an endemic species known only from one location – Wadi al Khalili on a high plateau near Mafhaq (1,550 meters elevation) in northern Yemen.

== Human use ==
The ecoregion has been settled for millennia. Archeological evidence of settled agriculture dates back more than 5000 years. Local people created terraced fields on steep slopes in areas of relatively high rainfall, and irrigated farms in the lower reaches of streams descending from the mountains. The mountains are also used for grazing livestock, including cattle, sheep, goats, and camels.

Boswellia sacra is a shrub or small tree that grows on drier northern slopes in the Hadramaut and Dhofar mountains and in northern Somalia. It is the source of frankincense, and aromatic resin, which has been harvested and traded for centuries. Myrrh is another aromatic resin gathered from Commiphora myrrha.

The woodlands have been degraded and reduced in area by overharvesting trees for timber and firewood, livestock grazing, and conversion to agriculture, particularly around the ecoregion's cities.

== Protected areas ==
1.37% of the ecoregion is in protected areas. Protected areas include Asir National Park, Jabal Shada al-A‘la Resource Use Reserve, and Raydah Natural Reserve.

== See also ==
- List of ecoregions in Yemen
