= Southwestern Arabian montane woodlands =

Xeric woodland ecoregion in the southwestern Arabian Peninsula

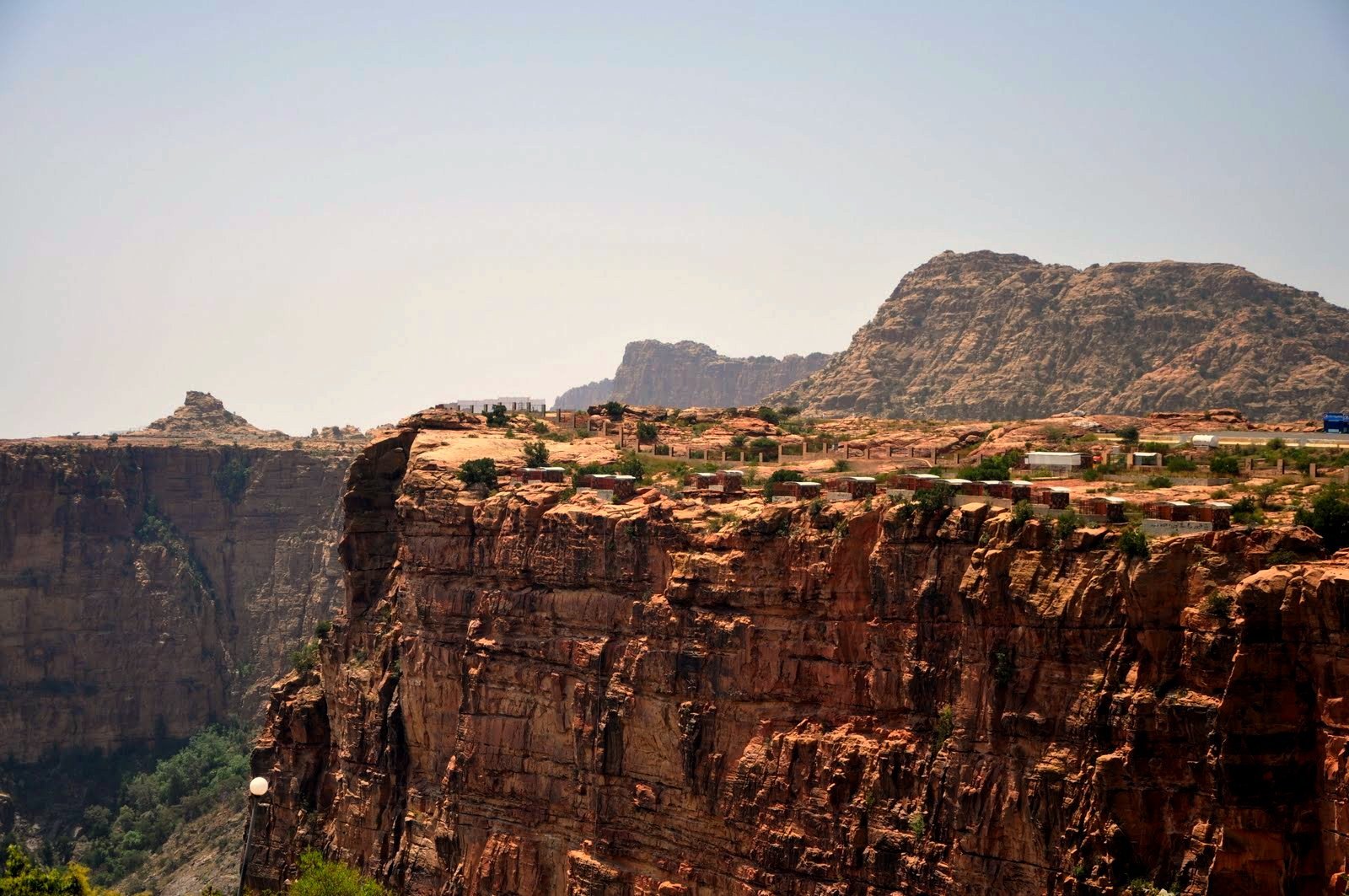
- Above Habala Valley, Saudi Arabia

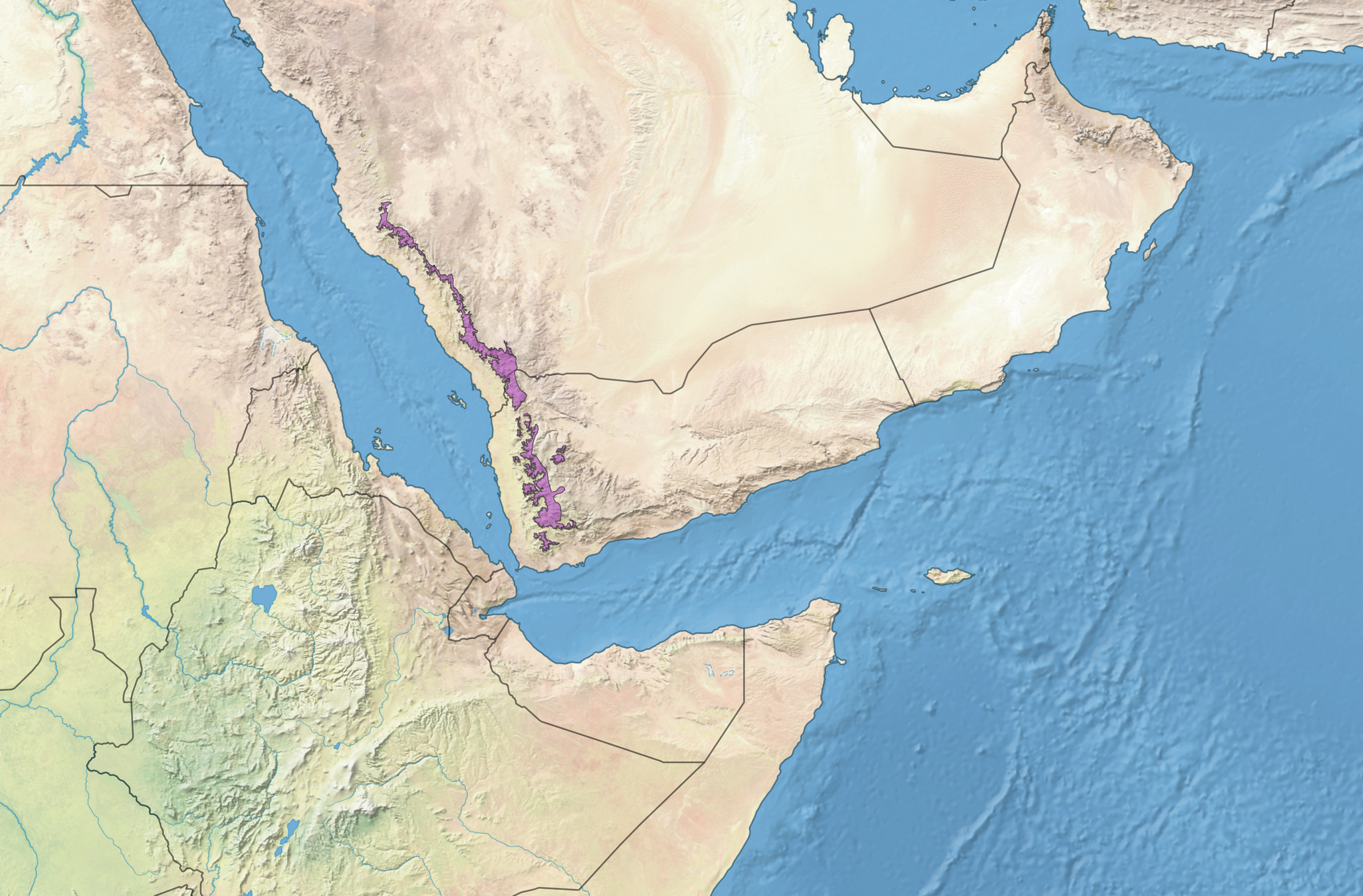
- Map of Southwestern Arabian montane woodlands

Ecology
- Realm: Afrotropical
- Biome: montane grasslands and shrublands
- Borders: Southwestern Arabian foothills savanna

Geography
- Area: 87,000 km^{2} (34,000 mi^{2})
- Countries: Saudi Arabia; Yemen
- Elevation: 1500 – 3666 m

Conservation
- Conservation status: vulnerable
- Protected: 0.43%

The Southwestern Arabian montane woodlands is a montane woodland ecoregion in the southwestern Arabian Peninsula.

== Setting ==
The ecoregion covers an area of 86,900 square kilometers (33,600 sq mi), lying above 2000 meters elevations in the Sarawat Mountains, which include the Asir Mountains of southwestern Saudi Arabia and the Western Highlands of Yemen. These mountains run generally north and south, parallel to the Red Sea coast. To the west the mountains drop steeply towards the Red Sea in a series of escarpments, and descend more gradually to the desert plateaus and basins to the east. The mountains generally decrease in elevation towards the north. The highest peak is Jabal An-Nabi Shu'ayb in Yemen (3,666 meters), which is also the highest on the Arabian Peninsula. Other peaks include Jabal Sawda and Jabal Ferwa in Saudi Arabia, which are the country's highest.

Sana'a, Yemen's capital city, is in the ecoregion.

== Flora ==
The flora changes with elevation. Evergreen woodland and scrub lies between 2000 and 2500 meters elevation, with Olea europaea subsp. cuspidata and Tarchonanthus camphoratus the predominant trees. Above 2500 meters elevation, cloud forests, composed of large shrubs and small trees, can be found on wetter north-facing slopes, mostly made up of Juniperus procera and Euryops arabicus, covered with the lichen Usnea articulata. On the drier south-facing slopes dwarf-shrub forests of Rubus petitianus, Rosa abyssinica, Alchemilla crytantha, Senecio spp., Helichrysum abyssinicum, Aloe sabae, and Euphorbia ssp. are common.

Below 2000 meters, the montane woodlands transition to the drier semi-evergreen open woodlands and thorn scrub of the Southwestern Arabian foothills savanna ecoregion.

== Fauna ==
The Arabian leopard (Panthera pardus ssp. nimr) and Arabian wolf (Canis lupus ssp. arabs) are critically endangered. Other mammals include the hamadryas baboon (Papio hamadryas), caracal (Caracal caracal ssp. schmitzi), rock hyrax (Procavia capensis ssp. jayakari), and striped hyena (Hyaena hyaena).

Several species of birds are endemic to the mountains of southwestern Arabia. They include Philby's partridge (Alectoris philbyi), Asir magpie (Pica asirensis), Yemen warbler (Curruca buryi), Yemen thrush (Turdus menachensis), Arabian accentor (Prunella fagani), Arabian waxbill (Estrilda rufibarba), Yemen serin (Crithagra menachensis), and Yemen linnet (Linaria yemenensis). Juniper berries are an important food source for the Yemen warbler, Yemen thrush, and Yemen linnet, and all three species nest in the juniper trees. Other native bird species with a wider range include the Arabian woodpecker (Dendrocopos dorae), Arabian wheatear (Oenanthe lugentoides), Arabian serin (Crithagra rothschildi), and Arabian golden-winged grosbeak (Rhynchostruthus percivali).

Raptors include the griffon vulture (Gyps fulvus), bearded vulture (Gypaetus barbatus), Verreaux's eagle (Aquila verreauxii), and Barbary falcon (Falco peregrinus pelegrinoides).

== Human use ==
Residents of the mountains have farmed the steep slopes for over 2000 years, creating terraced fields on the steep slopes. Wheat, barley, and sorghum are historically important crops.

Overharvesting trees for firewood and timber and intensive grazing by domestic and feral cattle, goats, sheep and camels have reduced and degraded the ecoregion's woodlands. Soil erosion from deforested slopes and abandoned terraces is also a threat.

The ecoregion's woodlands been greatly reduced in extent by human activity and livestock grazing. Many of the ecoregion's juniper forests are regenerating poorly. Possible causes include human disturbance, livestock grazing, climate change, and/or infestation of cones by a Tortricid moth.

== Protected areas ==
0.43% of the ecoregion is in protected areas. Protected areas include portions of Saudi Arabia's Asir National Park and Raydah Natural Reserve.

== See also ==
- List of ecoregions in Yemen
