= Wadi Turabah Nature Reserve =

Protected area in Saudi Arabia

The Wadi Turabah Nature Reserve is a protected area in the Makkah Region of southwestern Saudi Arabia. It is situated about 150 km (93 mi) south-east of Ta'if and 80 km (50 mi) north of al Bahah, sandwiched between the road between Taif and al Bahah and the road running along the escarpment between Banu Sa'ad and al Bahah. It adjoins the Jabal Ibrahim/Wadi Buwwah Protected Area, Jabal Ibrahim being a granite mountain rising about 1,000 m (3,300 ft) above the surrounding rocky hills. Wadi Turabah and Jabal Ibrahim have a total area of around 42,000 hectares (100,000 acres) and the elevation rises from 1,600 m (5,249 ft) to 2,604 m (8,543 ft) at the summit of Jabal Ibrahim.

== Habitat ==
Several streams originate on Jabal Ibrahim so that Wadi Turabah has a permanent flow. Habitats in the reserve include the bare sheets of rock and crags of the mountain, boulder-covered slopes with abundant vegetation, and montane woodland in which the main component is Juniperus. Near the wadis, Ficus and Ziziphus trees grow thickly, and at lower elevations there is Acacia woodland.

== Flora and fauna ==
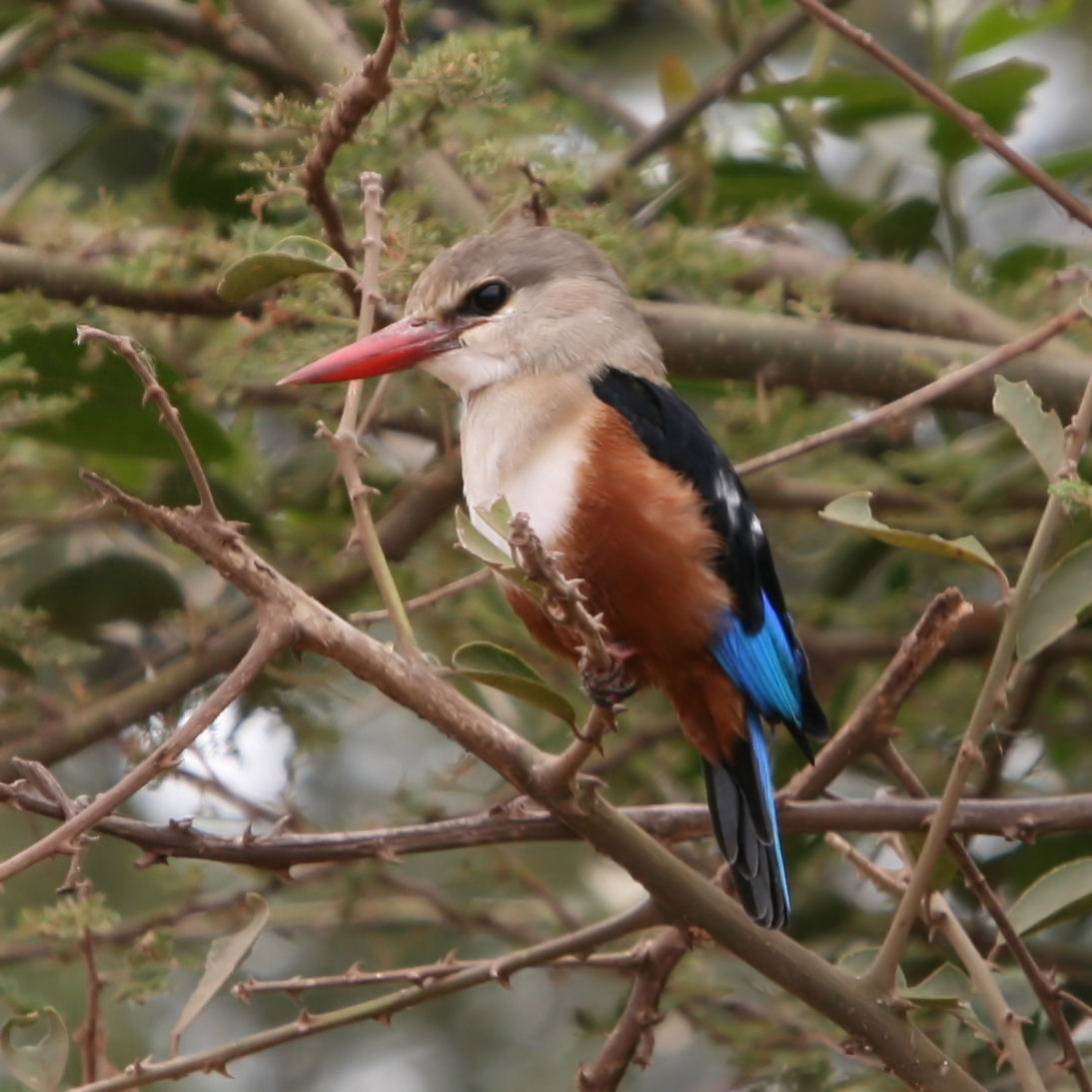
Grey-headed kingfisher

The hamadryas baboon can be found here, as well as large carnivores such as the Arabian wolf, the red fox and the caracal. In the streams, the endemic fish Cyprinion mahalensis, Garra buettikeri and Barbus apoensis can be found, and the flora of Jabal Ibrahim is of high botanic interest.

Wadi Turabah and Jabal Ibrahim have been designated as an Important Bird and Biodiversity Area by BirdLife International. Trigger species for this include Philby's partridge, Arabian partridge, griffon vulture, Egyptian vulture, montane nightjar, Arabian woodpecker, brown woodland warbler, Arabian warbler, Tristram's starling, Yemen thrush, Arabian wheatear, Arabian waxbill, little rock thrush, Arabian serin, Yemen serin, Yemen linnet and cinereous bunting. Other bird species to be found here include Verreaux's eagle, grey-headed kingfisher and cinnamon-breasted bunting, and up to twenty black storks overwinter here.

Wadi Turabah Nature Reserve is the only place on the Arabian Peninsula in which the hamerkop breeds, with about thirty birds being present in the reserve.
