= South Arabian fog woodlands, shrublands, and dune =

Ecoregion in Oman and Yemen

South Arabian coastal fog woodlands, shrublands, and dune
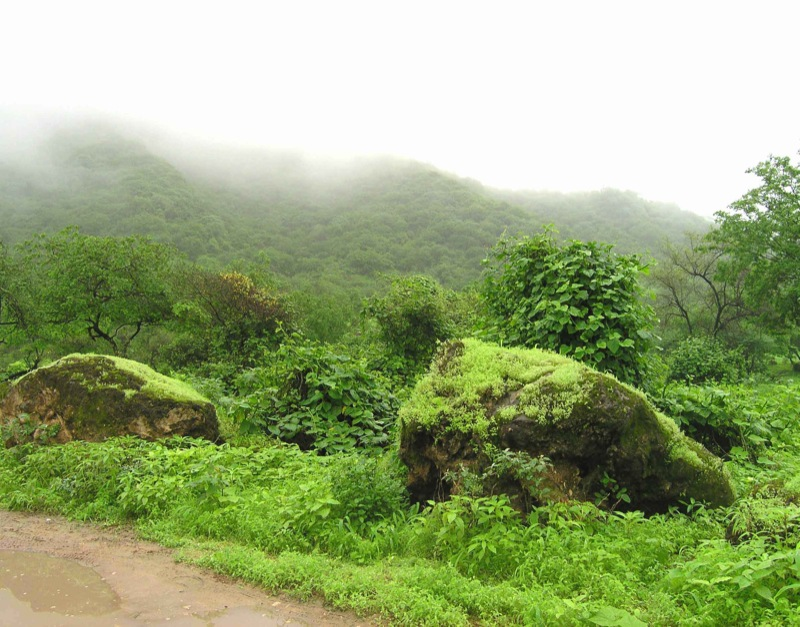
- Fog woodlands in the Dhofar Mountains near Salalah, Oman.

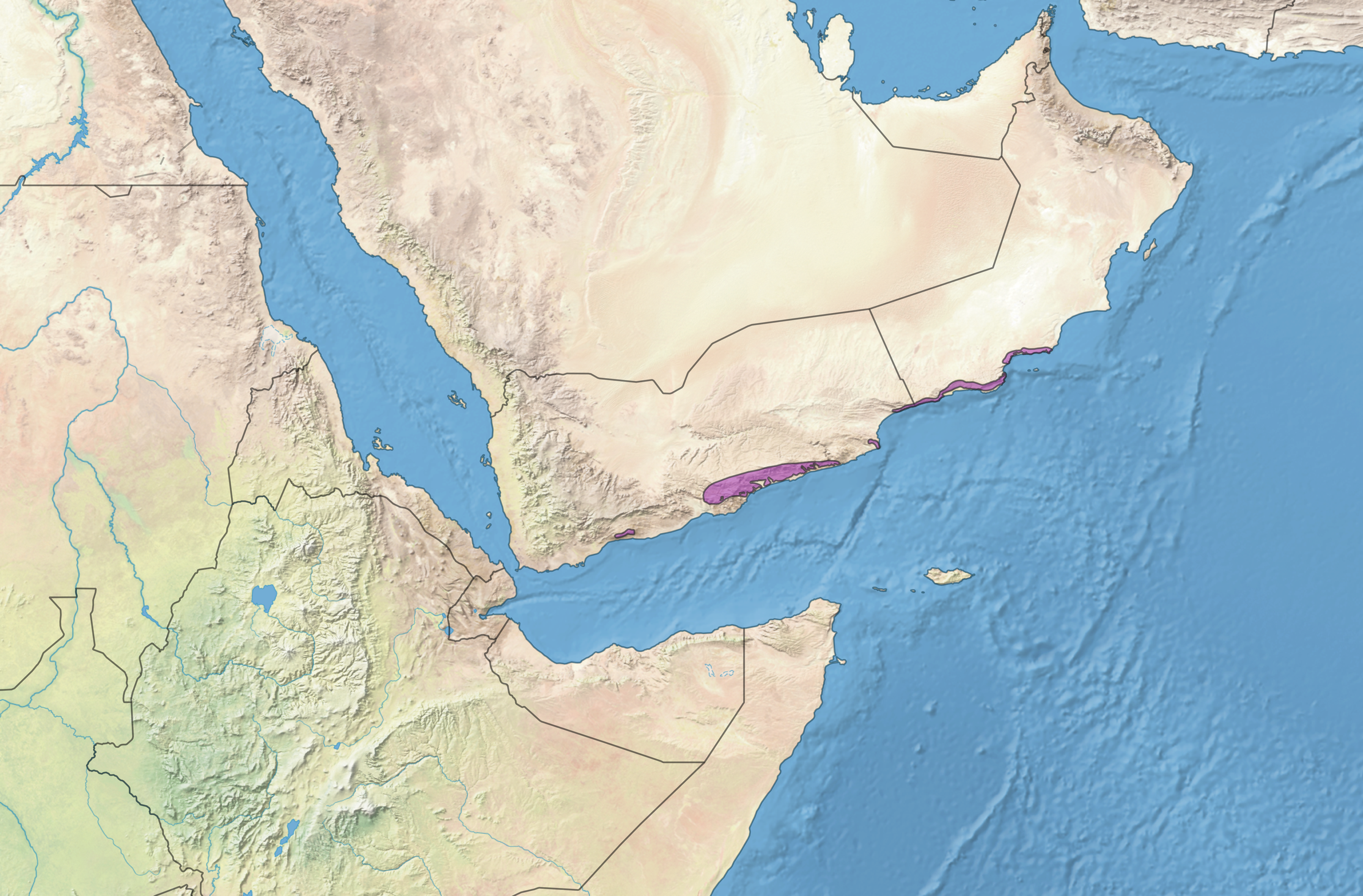
- Map of the South Arabian Fog Woodlands, Shrublands, and Dune Ecoregion (purple)

Ecology
- Realm: Afrotropical
- Biome: Tropical and subtropical grasslands, savannas, and shrublands
- Borders: Arabian Peninsula coastal fog desert; Southwestern Arabian foothills savanna

Geography
- Area: 19,913 km^{2} (7,688 sq mi)
- Countries: Oman; Yemen
- Elevation: sea level to 2,100 m

Conservation
- Conservation status: critical/endangered
- Protected: 685 km^{2} (3%)

The South Arabian fog woodlands, shrublands, and dune is an ecoregion in Oman and Yemen. The fog woodlands lie on mountainsides which slope southeastwards towards the Arabian Sea. The mountains intercept moisture-bearing winds from the Arabian Sea, creating orographic precipitation and frequent fogs that sustain unique woodlands and shrublands in a desert region.

== Geography ==
The ecoregion occupies an area of 19,913 square kilometres (7,688 sq mi) in eastern Yemen and southern Oman's Dhofar Governorate. The ecoregion covers four separate areas.

The westernmost is the Ureys (or Areys) range, a coastal mountain range that rises east of the town of Shuqrah, 150 kilometres northeast of Aden. The range is made up of dark igneous rock, extending about 65 kilometres east and west parallel to the coast. It is named for its tallest peak, Jabal Ureys (1,735 metres), which lies at the western end of the range close to the coast. The rest of the range is an east–west ridge 1,500 to 1,600 metres high, dropping to a dissected plateau 1,200–1,350 metres elevation and 2–3 kilometres wide on the seaward (southern) side. There is a steep escarpment between the plateau and the coast.

The largest area is in the Hadhramaut mountains of Yemen, on the mountainsides above Mukalla. The Hadhramaut mountains rise up to 2,100 metres elevation. The eastern area is in the Dhofar Mountains, extending from easternmost Yemen to Ras ash Sharbatat in Oman. In between the Dhofar and Hahramaut is a small enclave on Jabal Fartak in Yemen, above the headland of Ras Fartak.

The ecoregion is bounded inland by the Southwestern Arabian foothills savanna ecoregion, which includes the drier foothill and mountain forests of southwest Arabia. The ecoregion is bounded on the ocean side by the Arabian Peninsula coastal fog desert, which occupies the coastal strip along the Arabian Sea.

== Flora ==
The predominant plant communities include deciduous woodland with trees Terminalia (formerly Anogeissus), Vachellia and Commiphora, shrubland of Olea europaea, Dodonaea viscosa, Carissa spinarum and Searsia somalensis, succulent scrubland including Aloe, Caralluma, Euphorbia, Adenium and Cissus, as well as semi-desert grassland.

Terminalia dhofarica is endemic to the ecoregion and is the characteristic tree of the woodlands. A. dhofarica is a tall tree which can grow up to twelve metres in height. It is dry-season deciduous, losing its leaves in November or December at the start of the winter dry season and re-leafing when the khareef (southwest monsoon) brings summer rains. Terminalia bentii is endemic to the Hadhramaut and Ras Fartak areas.

In the Ureys range, semi-evergreen forests grow on the seaward plateau and escarpment between 800 and 1,200 metres elevation, dominated by Olea europaea subsp. cuspidata and Tarchonanthus camphoratus, with Acokanthera schimperi, Cordia monoica, Euclea racemosa subsp. schimperi, Searsia flexicaulis, and Searsia glutinosa subsp. abyssinica. Escarpment gorges with more year-round water shelter evergreen trees Rotheca myricoides, Ficus ingens, Nuxia oppositifolia and Mimusops laurifolia, which are generally found in the forests of eastern Africa.

The ecoregion is home to 850 species of plants, of which 90 are endemic. Endemic species include Capparis macleishii, Aloe dhufarensis, A. mahraensis, and Blepharis dhofarensis. Endemics in the Ureys range include Cystostemon kissenioides, Salvia areysiana, and Kleinia deflersii.

The ecoregion is home to Boswellia sacra, the shrub from which aromatic frankincense is harvested.

== Ecoregion delineation ==
In the 2001 Terrestrial Ecoregions of the World (TEOW) system, "a biogeographic regionalization of the Earth's terrestrial biodiversity", the region was divided between the Arabian Peninsula coastal fog desert and Southwestern Arabian foothills savanna ecoregions.

In 2017, some of the authors of the 2001 system proposed a revised ecoregion system for the Arabian Peninsula, which designated the South Arabian fog woodlands, shrublands, and dune as a separate ecoregion.

== See also ==
- List of ecoregions in Yemen
