= Raydah Natural Reserve =

Natural reserve in Saudi Arabia

Raydah Natural Reserve is a 9.33 km^{2} protected area in Saudi Arabia managed by the Saudi Wildlife Authority. The reserve situated adjacent to 'Asir National Park. It was listed as a protected area in 1989.

== Wildlife ==
Raydah reserve is a habitat to a diversity of animals such as the Arabian Wolf, Caracal, Rock Hyrax, Mongoose, and Nubian Ibex. The reserve is also home to a variety of birdlife like Yemen thrush, Arabian Red-Legged Partridge, Arabian Woodpecker, and Yemen Linnet.

== See also ==
- List of protected areas of Saudi Arabia
