= Mimusops laurifolia =

Scientific classification
- Kingdom: Plantae
- Clade: Tracheophytes
- Clade: Angiosperms
- Clade: Eudicots
- Clade: Asterids
- Order: Ericales
- Family: Sapotaceae
- Genus: Mimusops
- Species: M. laurifolia

Binomial name
- Mimusops laurifolia (Forssk.) Friis

Synonyms
- Binectaria laurifolia Forssk.; Mimusops schimperi Hochst.

Species of tree

Mimusops laurifolia is a large evergreen tree, native to the Ethiopian Highlands and the highlands of the southeastern Arabian Peninsula.

== Description ==
Mimusops laurifolia is an evergreen, broad-canopied tree, typically growing up to 15 metres tall, and up to 25 metres under optimal conditions. The leaves are oval and leathery, and clustered towards the end of the twigs. The fruit is an oval yellow berry about 35mm x 20mm.

== Distribution ==
In Africa, M. laurifolia is found in scattered sites in the northern and eastern Ethiopian Highlands of Eritrea, Ethiopia, northwestern Somaliland, and in the coastal mountains of Djibouti. It is found on mountain slopes, in dry Juniperus-Olea forests in association with Juniperus procera and Olea europaea, as single large trees in evergreen or semi-evergreen bushland outside the forest, and in riparian forests or as isolated trees along intermittent streams.

It also occurs in a few sites on the southwestern Arabian Peninsula – in stream valleys on the slopes of the Sarawat Mountains in northwestern Yemen and southwestern Saudi Arabia, and on Jabal Ureys and Jabal Gedu, coastal mountains along Yemen's southern coast. In Jabal Ureys and Jabal Gedu, M. laurifolia occurs in small enclaves of fog forest where the coastal mountains intercept moisture-bearing winds from the Arabian Sea.

== Uses ==
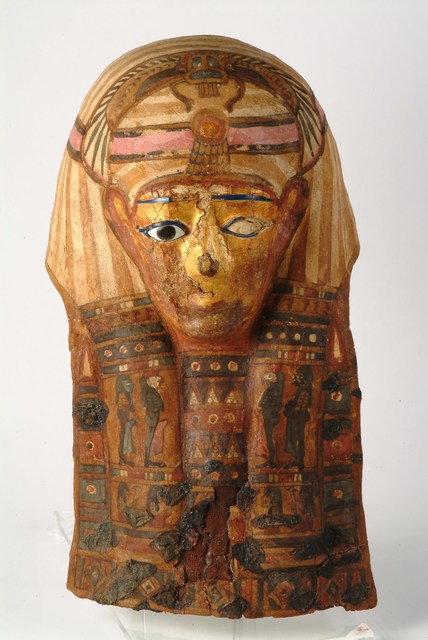
Egyptian gilded mummy mask from 100 BCE - 50 CE, carved from Mimusops laurifolia wood.

Local communities gather the edible fruit from wild trees, and occasionally use the timber for fuel, construction, and carpentry. The wood is light brown to pale yellow.

Mimusops laurifolia was cultivated in ancient Egypt. Twigs and leaves have been found in tombs from the Twelfth Dynasty to Greco-Roman times, and it was mentioned in texts from the 18th Dynasty onwards. The wood was fashioned into ushabti figurines and other funerary objects, or into furniture such as beds and tables. M. laurifolia is often referred to by its Ancient Greek name "persea"; it is unrelated to the genus of that name.

== Conservation status ==
M. laurifolia is extremely rare in Southwest Arabia. Its distribution is limited to humid sites, and it has suffered from habitat destruction, overgrazing, and desertification. The population in the Sarawat mountains is limited to a few stream valleys (wadis). Twelve trees were observed in Jabal Gedu, and only two trees in Jabal Ureys.
