= Red Sea Nubo–Sindian tropical desert and semi-desert =

Red Sea Nubo-Sindian tropical desert and semi-desert
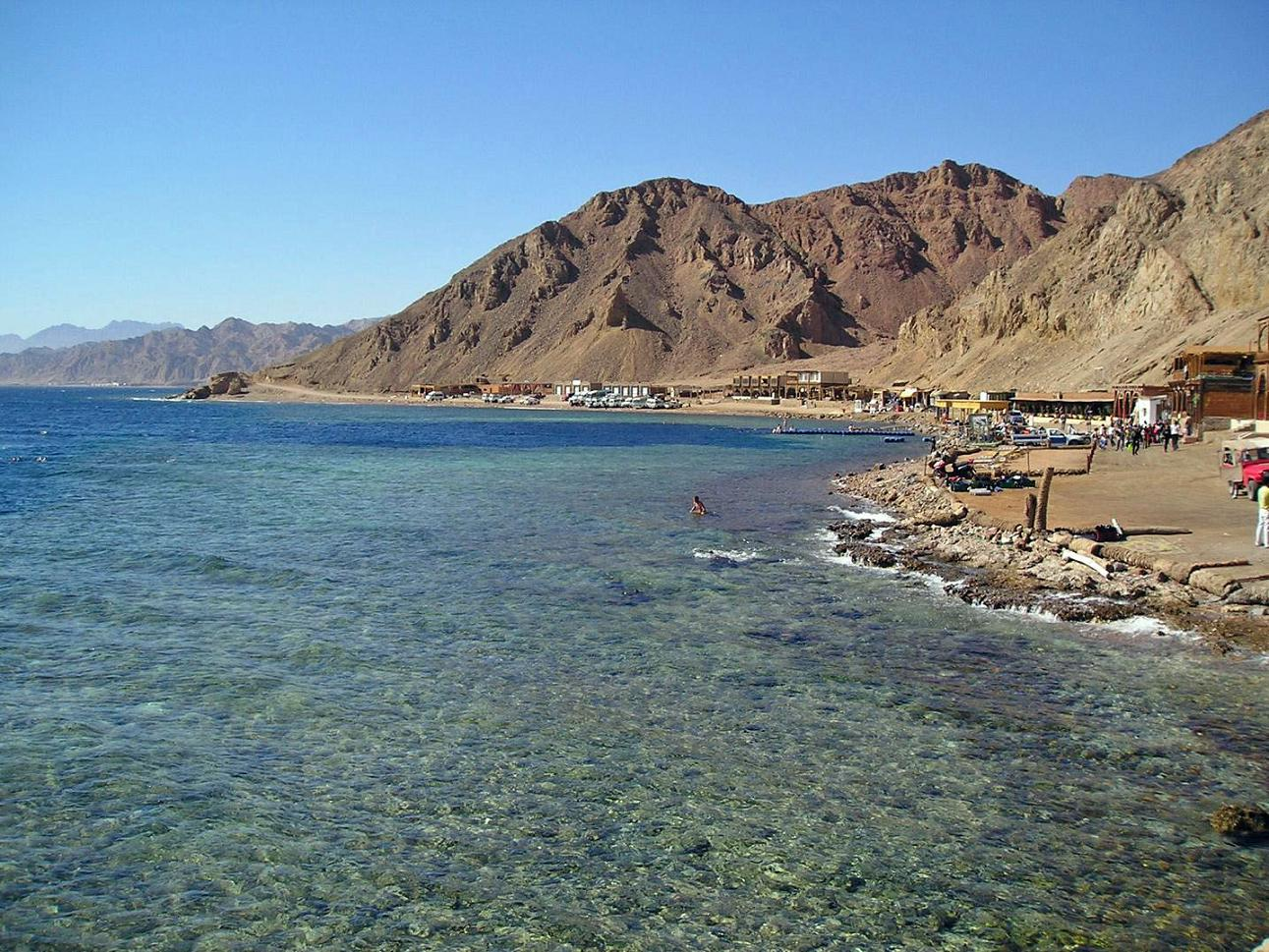
- Blue Lagoon, near Dahab, Egypt

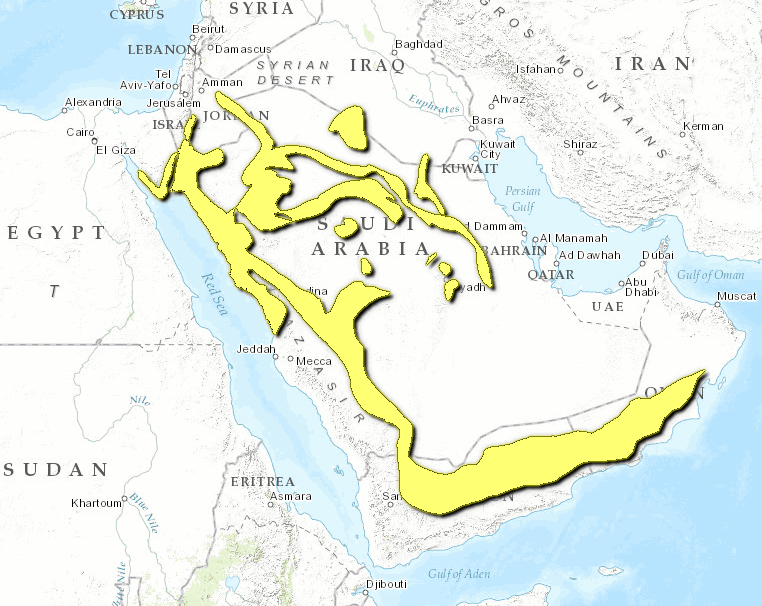
- Ecoregion territory (in yellow)

Ecology
- Realm: Palearctic
- Biome: Deserts and xeric shrublands
- Borders: Arabian desert; Arabian peninsula coastal fog desert; Gulf of Oman desert and semi-desert; Southwestern Arabian foothills savanna

Geography
- Area: 652,683 km^{2} (252,002 mi^{2})
- Country: Saudi Arabia, Egypt, Israel, Jordan, Yemen
- Coordinates: 24.25°N 39.25°E

The Red Sea Nubo–Sindian tropical desert and semi-desert ecoregion (WWF ID: PA1325) covers extremely arid land along the northeastern Red Sea, the southern Sinai Peninsula, and on a thin strip along the Israel-Jordan border. Most of the coastal land is flat, but there are high mountains in southern Sinai. Biodiversity is limited by the low moisture levels – some areas go for years without significant rain. Portions of the area support a thin savannah-like cover of widely scattered trees and scrub, surrounded by grasses that briefly flourish after a rainfall. Biodiversity is highest in the mountains of Sinai, and in the wadis and gullies that retain moisture.

== Location and description ==
"Nubo-Sindian" refers to the biogeographical region along the coast of the Arabian Peninsula. The ecoregion stretches 2,000 kilometres (1,200 mi), from the Jordan River valley north of the Dead Sea, to just short of the Gulf of Aden in Yemen. It also covers the southern slopes of the mountains in the south of the Sinai Peninsula, and reaches inland in low plains at various places along its length on the Arabian Peninsula. Small extensions to the east reach the Shammar Mountains in central Saudi Arabia. The terrain is sand and gravel on the flats, and granite and sandstone in the mountains. The highest point is in the St. Catherine area of the southern Sinai, at 2,388 metres (7,835 ft). The ecoregion bordering to the east is the Arabian Desert and East Sahero-Arabian xeric shrublands ecoregion.

== Climate ==
The climate of the ecoregion is Hot desert climate (Köppen climate classification (BWh)). This climate features stable air and high pressure aloft, producing a hot, arid desert. Hot-month temperatures typically average 29–35 °C (84–95 °F). Precipitation ranges from 50 mm/year to 100 mm/year.

== Flora and fauna ==
99% of the land area is bare ground, or sparse vegetation. Shrubs and herbaceous vegetation are found in the deep wadis and gullies that can retain moisture, and after a rainfall there are areas that briefly sprout grasses. Most of the plant diversity is in the southern Sinai, where 700 species of vascular plants have been recorded, and 35 endemic species. A number of the endemic species of vertebrates are reptiles, including the endangered Sinai cat snake (Telescopus hoogstraali) and the endangered Phoenicolacerta kulzeri.

== Protected areas ==
Over 5% of the ecoregion is officially protected. These protected areas include:

- Shaumari Wildlife Reserve
- Ras Muhammad National Park

== See also ==
- List of ecoregions in Yemen
