= List of ecoregions in Yemen =

The following is a list of ecoregions in Yemen, as identified by the Worldwide Fund for Nature (WWF).

== Terrestrial ecoregions ==
Yemen lies on the boundary between two of the world's biogeographic realms. The Afrotropical realm covers the southeastern portion of the Arabian Peninsula, as well as Sub-Saharan Africa and Madagascar. The Palearctic realm covers the rest of the Arabian Peninsula as well as temperate Eurasia and Northern Africa.

=== Tropical and subtropical grasslands, savannas, and shrublands ===
- Southwestern Arabian montane woodlands (Afrotropical)
- South Arabian fog woodlands, shrublands, and dune (Afrotropical)

=== Deserts and xeric shrublands ===
- Arabian Desert (Palearctic)
- Arabian Peninsula coastal fog desert (Afrotropical)
- Red Sea Nubo-Sindian tropical desert and semi-desert (Palearctic)
- Socotra Island xeric shrublands (Afrotropical)
- Southwestern Arabian foothills savanna (Afrotropical)

== Freshwater ecoregions ==
- Arabian Interior
- Southwestern Arabian Coast
- Socotra

== Marine ecoregions ==
Yemen's seas are divided into three marine ecoregions, all part of the Western Indo-Pacific marine realm.

- Southern Red Sea
- Gulf of Aden
- Western Arabian Sea
