= Terminalia dhofarica =

Conservation status
- Vulnerable (IUCN 2.3)

Scientific classification
- Kingdom: Plantae
- Clade: Tracheophytes
- Clade: Angiosperms
- Clade: Eudicots
- Clade: Rosids
- Order: Myrtales
- Family: Combretaceae
- Genus: Terminalia
- Species: T. dhofarica

Binomial name
- Terminalia dhofarica (A.J.Scott) Gere & Boatwr. (2017)

Synonyms
- Anogeissus dhofarica A.J.Scott (1979)

Species of tree

Terminalia dhofarica is a species of plant in the Combretaceae family. It is found in Oman and Yemen, where it is endemic to the South Arabian fog woodlands, shrublands, and dune ecoregion. It is threatened by habitat loss.

T. dhofarica is a tall tree which can grow up to 12 meters in height. It is dry-season deciduous, losing its leaves in November or December at the start of the winter dry season, and re-leafing when the southwest monsoon brings summer rains.

It featured on the 50 Omani baisa stamp in 2004.

== Uses ==
All parts of the tree are used as building material. The leaves are collected and used to produce a yellow and yellowish-green dye.
