= Arabian Peninsula coastal fog desert =

Ecoregion on the southern coasts of the Arabian Peninsula

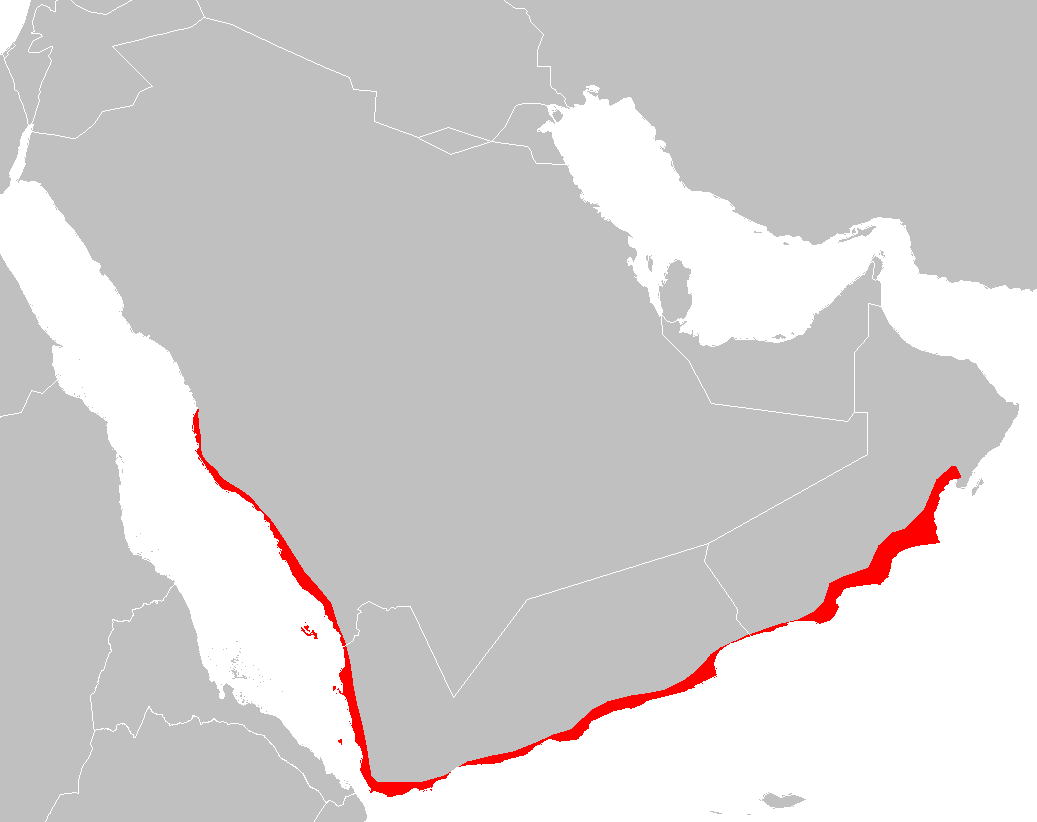
- map of the Arabian Peninsula coastal fog desert

Ecology
- Realm: Afrotropic
- Biome: Deserts and xeric shrublands

Geography
- Area: 82,900 km^{2} (32,000 mi^{2})
- Countries: Oman; Saudi Arabia; Yemen

Conservation
- Conservation status: critical/endangered

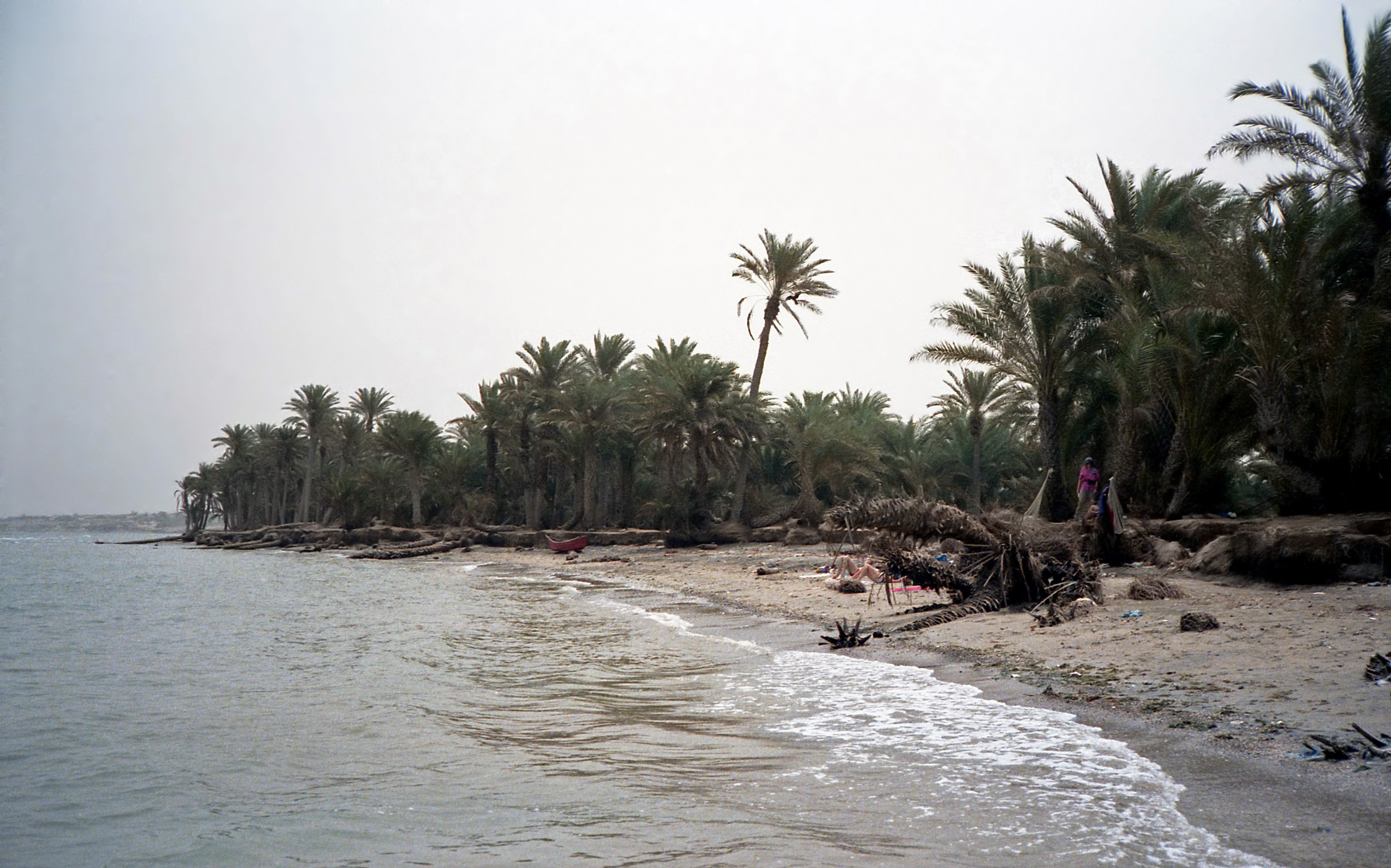
Tihama on the Red Sea near Khaukha in Yemen is part of this ecosystem

The Arabian Peninsula coastal fog desert, also known as the Southwestern Arabian coastal xeric scrub, is a desert ecoregion on the southern coasts of the Arabian Peninsula, which experiences thick fogs where visibility may be reduced to 10 metres (33 ft). It is classed as an Afrotropical fog desert

== Location and description ==
This ecosystem exists on a strip along the western and eastern coasts of Arabia. It follows the coast of Oman southward from Masirah Island and reaches inland to 120 kilometres (75 mi) in the Jiddat al Harasisi plateau and the Dhofar Mountains. From here it continues as a very narrow strip (only 5 kilometres (3.1 mi) wide) along the coast of Yemen and up the 50 kilometres (31 mi) wide the Tihamah plain along the Red Sea coast of Saudi Arabia. In Oman and Yemen moisture is provided by thick fogs coming off the ocean during the summer khareef monsoon, while the hot Tihamah plain is moisturised by some rainfall and the generally high humidity of the Red Sea.

== Flora and fauna ==
Although it rarely rains, the fog provides moisture sufficient to nurture a great deal of grassland, shrubs and thick woodland. There are over 60 local species of plants. This coastal strip is of particular importance because further inland where the fog does not have an influence, most of the Arabian Peninsula is desert.

Vegetation varies progressively away from the coast which features dense woodland of Terminalia dhofarica, Senegalia senegal and various thorny Commiphora trees and shrubs. The richest flora can be found in the Dhofar Mountains which have 900 plants including 60 endemic species. One of these plants, Boswellia sacra (frankincense), was a source of great wealth for Dhofar in antiquity. In Yemen, the side of Jabal Urays facing the sea is covered with Euphorbia balsamifera shrubs.

The many mammals found here include the Arabian Oryx (Oryx leucoryx) which was reintroduced to the wild after disappearing, Arabian Gazelle and Nubian Ibex, a goat antelope. Predators found on the coast include Caracal, Arabian Wolf, Striped Hyena and the critically endangered Arabian Leopard (Panthera pardus nimr), which survives on Jebel Samhan in the Dhofar mountains.

== Threats and preservation ==
The main threat to this ecosystem is overgrazing by increasing numbers of cattle and other livestock as well as off-road driving and human encroachment. Urban areas in this ecoregion include: in Oman the port of Duqm and the Dhofar capital of Salalah; in Yemen, the Hadhramaut port capital Mukalla, the former capital and ancient port of Aden, the Red Sea coffee ports of Hodeidah (the largest town on this coast of Yemen) and Mokha, and the World Heritage Site of Zabid; and the city of Jizan, the fruit basket of Saudi Arabia.

Protected areas in Oman include the controversial Arabian Oryx Sanctuary where the reintroduction took place, and Jabal Samhan Nature Reserve established for the protection of the leopards. There are several Important Bird Areas on the coast of Yemen, but none are officially protected.

== See also ==
- List of ecoregions in Yemen
