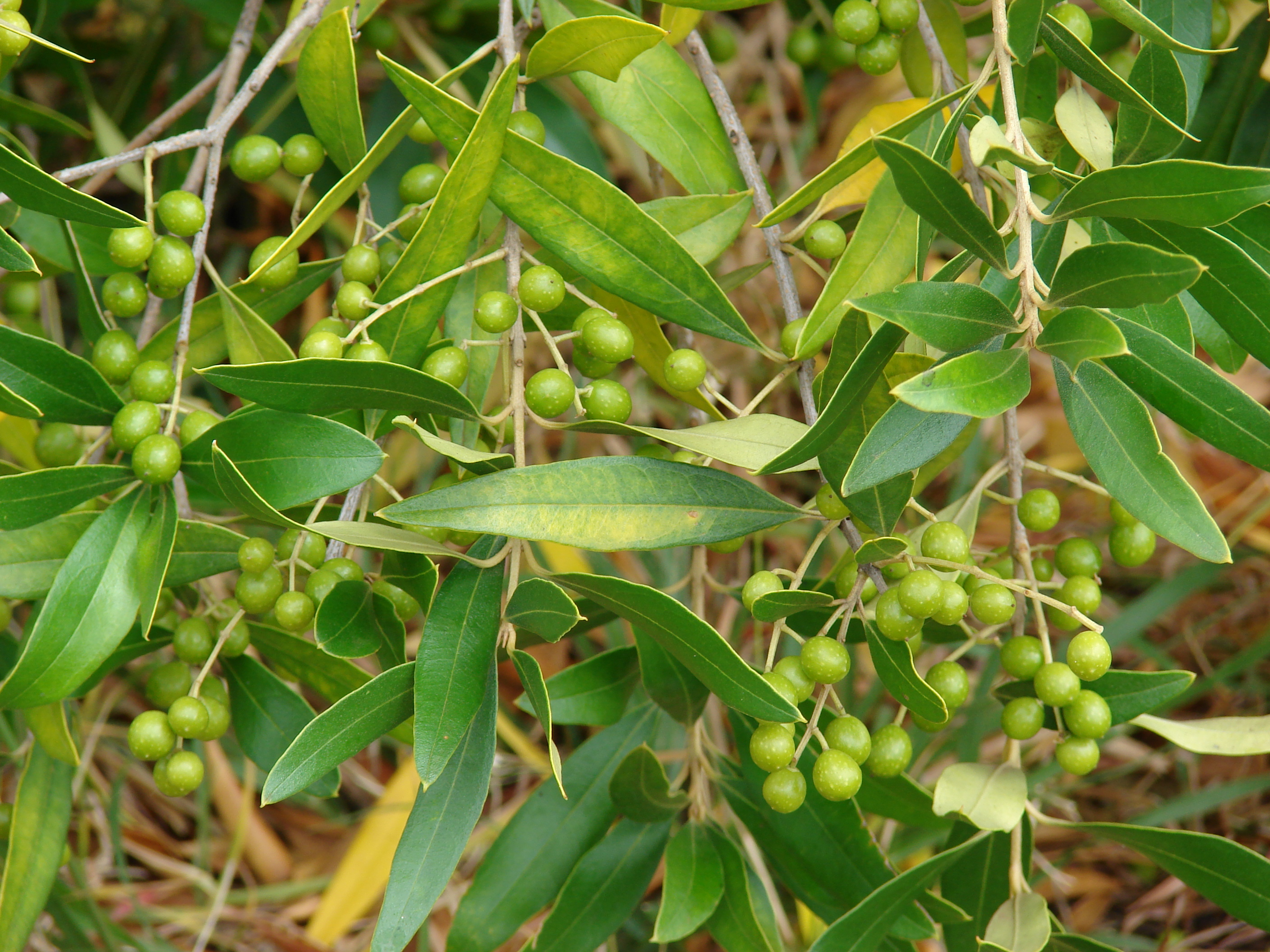

Scientific classification
- Kingdom: Plantae
- Clade: Tracheophytes
- Clade: Angiosperms
- Clade: Eudicots
- Clade: Asterids
- Order: Lamiales
- Family: Oleaceae
- Genus: Olea
- Species: O. europaea
- Subspecies: O. e. subsp. cuspidata

Trinomial name
- Olea europaea subsp. cuspidata (Wall. & G.Don) Cif.

Synonyms
- List: Linociera lebrunii Staner in Rev. Zool. Bot. Africaines 22: 244 (1932); Olea africana Mill. in Gard. Dict., ed. 8.: n.° 4 (1768); Olea asiatica Desf. in Tabl. École Bot., ed. 3: 88 (1829), nom. nud.; Olea aucheri A.Chev. ex Ehrend. in Anz. Österr. Akad. Wiss., Math.-Naturwiss. Kl. 97: 156 (1960); Olea chrysophylla Lam. in Tabl. Encycl. 1: 29 (1791); Olea chrysophylla var. aucheri A.Chev. in Rev. Intern. Bot. Appl. Paris 28(303-304): 18 (1948); Olea chrysophylla var. cuspidata (Wall. ex G.Don) A.Chev. in Rev. Bot. Appl. Agric. Trop. 28: 18 (1948); Olea chrysophylla var. ferruginea (Royle) A.Chev. in Rev. Bot. Appl. Agric. Trop. 28: 18 (1948); Olea chrysophylla var. nubica (Schweinf. ex Baker) A.Chev. in Rev. Bot. Appl. Agric. Trop. 28: 18 (1948); Olea chrysophylla var. somaliensis (Baker) A.Chev. in Rev. Bot. Appl. Agric. Trop. 28: 18 (1948); Olea chrysophylla var. subnuda R.E.Fr. in Wiss. Erg. Schwed. Rhodesia-Kongo-Exp. 1911-1912, 1: 258 (1916); Olea chrysophylla var. verrucosa (Willd.) A.Chev. in Rev. Bot. Appl. Agric. Trop. 28: 19 (1948); Olea cuspidata Wall. ex G.Don in Gen. Hist. 4: 49 (1837); Olea europaea f. dulcis Collen. in Bot. Mag. (Kew Mag.) 5: 38 (1988), nom. illeg.; Olea europaea subsp. africana (Mill.) P.S.Green in Kew Bull. 34: 69 (1979); Olea europaea var. cuspidata (Wall. ex G.Don) Cif. in Olivicoltore 19(5): 96 (1942); Olea europaea var. ferruginea (Royle) Cif. in Oleaia 3-4: 3 (1950), nom. illeg.; Olea europaea var. nubica Schweinf. ex Baker in D.Oliver & auct. suc. (eds.), Fl. Trop. Afr. 4(1): 18 (1902); Olea europaea var. verrucosa Willd. in Sp. Pl., ed. 4. 1: 44 (1797); Olea ferruginea Royle in Ill. Bot. Himal. Mts.: 267 (1835), nom. illeg.; Olea indica Kleinhof ex Burm.f. in Fl. Indica: 6 (1768); Olea kilimandscharica Knobl. in Notizbl. Bot. Gart. Berlin-Dahlem 12: 200 (1934); Olea monticola Gand. in Bull. Soc. Bot. France 65: 58 (1918); Olea sativa var. verrucosa (Willd.) Roem. & Schult. in Syst. Pl. 1: 69 (1817); Olea schimperi Gand. in Bull. Soc. Bot. France 65: 58 (1918); Olea similis Burch. in Trav. S. Africa 1: 177 (1822), nom. superfl.; Olea somaliensis Baker in D.Oliver & auct. suc. (eds.), Fl. Trop. Afr. 4(1): 18 (1902); Olea subtrinervata Chiov. in Atti Reale Accad. Italia, Mem. Cl. Sci. Fis. 11: 49 (1940); Olea verrucosa (Willd.) Link in Enum. Hort. Berol. Alt. 1: 33 (1821); Olea verrucosa var. brachybotrys DC. in Prodr. 8: 285 (1844)

= Olea europaea subsp. cuspidata =

Subspecies of the olive tree

Olea europaea subsp. cuspidata is a subspecies of the well-known olive tree (Olea europaea), which until recently was considered a separate species (Olea africana) and is still mentioned as such in many sources. Native to mostly dry areas across sub-Saharan Africa, West Asia, the Himalayan region and southern China, it has various common names, including wild olive, African olive, brown olive and Indian olive.

It is the ancestor of the cultivated olive and it has been introduced to Australia, New Zealand and the US. It is an aggressive invasive species that can infest dry woodland areas, riparian zones, headlands and dune systems.

== Description ==
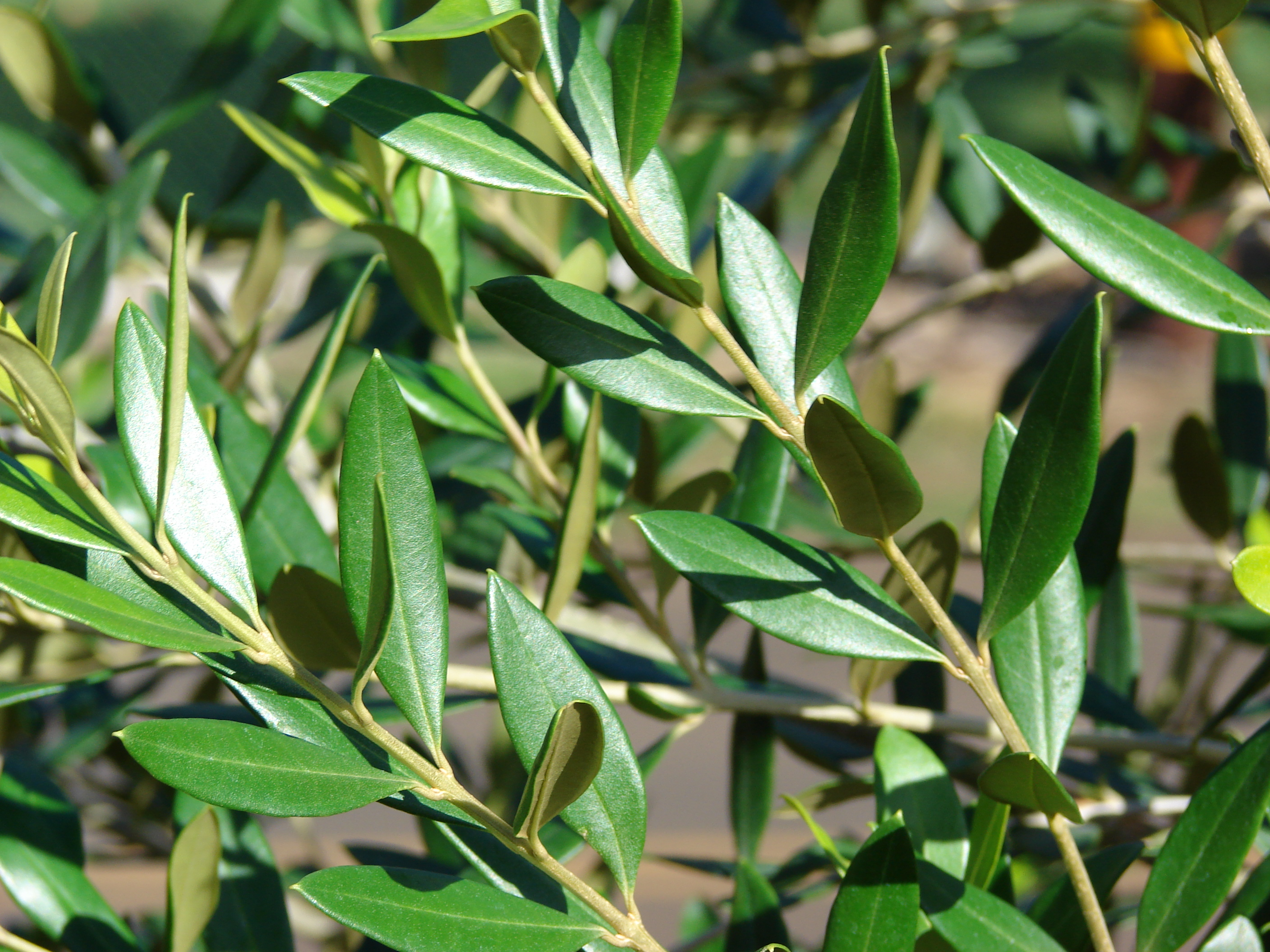
Leaves

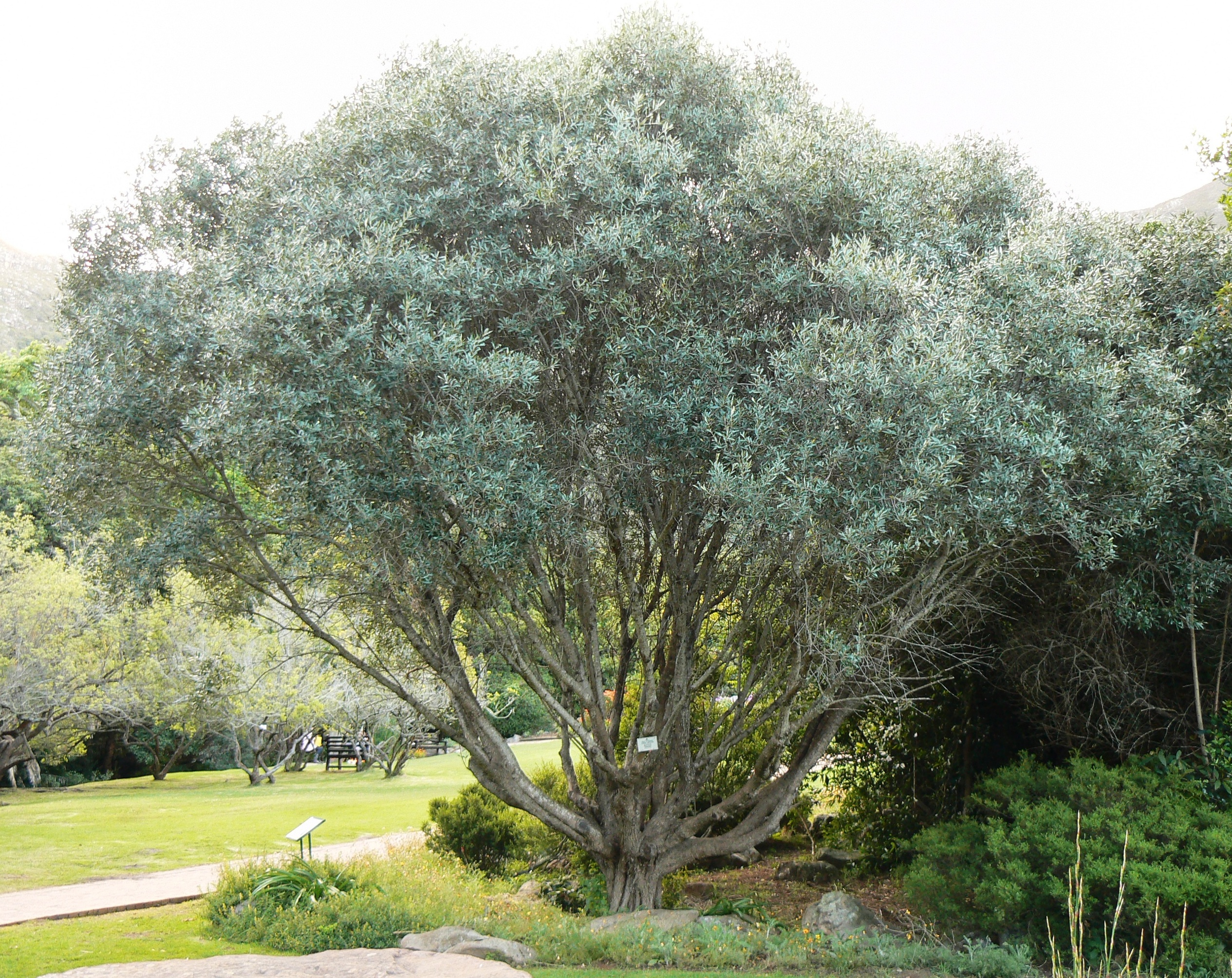
Mature tree in Cape Town, South Africa

This much-branched evergreen tree varies in size from 2 to 15 metres (7 to 50 ft) high. The leaves have an opposite, decussate arrangement, and are entire, 3 to 7 centimetres (1.2 to 2.8 in) long and 8 to 25 millimetres (0.3 to 1 in) wide; the apex is acute with a small hook or point, and the base is attenuate to cuneate.

Leaf margins are entire and recurved, the upper surface is grey-green and glossy, and the lower surface has a dense covering of silvery, golden or brown scales. Domatia are absent; venation is obvious on the upper surface and obscure on the lower surface; the petiole is up to 10 millimetres (0.4 in) long.

In drier areas, the plant may be less than 1 metre (3 ft 3 in) tall within 5–10 years, though it may still reach sexual maturity at around five to six years when it is a shrub at 4 metres (13 ft)} high. In the right conditions, the plant can reach its full height of 10 to 13 metres (30 to 40 ft) between 8 and 12 years.

=== Inflorescence and fruit ===
The flowers are small and inconspicuous, usually appearing in spring. The calyx is four-lobed, about 1 millimetre (0.04 in) long. The corolla is greenish-white or cream; the tube is 1 to 2 millimetres (0.039 to 0.079 in) long; lobes are about 3 millimetres (0.12 in) long and reflexed at the anthesis. The two stamens are fused near the top of the corolla tube, with bilobed stigma.

Fruit are borne in panicles or racemes 50 to 60 millimetres (2.0 to 2.4 in) long. The fruit are edible but bitter. The globose to ellipsoid fruit is a drupe, 6 millimetres (0.24 in) in diameter and 15 to 25 millimetres (0.59 to 0.98 in) long; it is fleshy, glaucous to a dull shine when ripe, and purple-black.

== Distribution ==
It is extensively found through Africa (i.e. Egypt, Eastern Africa, Central Africa and Southern Africa), the Mascarenes (i.e. Mauritius and Réunion), western Asia (i.e. Arabian Peninsula, Afghanistan and Iran), the Indian sub-continent (i.e. northern India, Nepal and Pakistan) and western China. Subtropical dry and moist forests of Olea europaea cuspidata are found in the Himalayan subtropical broadleaf forests ecoregion.

In areas where it is not native, such as Australia, it is classified as an environmental weed spread mainly by birds eating the fruit. It is widely naturalized in New South Wales, Victoria, South Australia and Western Australia, where it is found in bushlands, parks, roadsides and waste areas on the coast and in highlands, where it would alter the original composition of the native vegetation. It was first introduced to Australia in the mid 19th century for ornamental reasons.

== Uses ==
The wood is much-prized and durable, with a strong smell similar to bay rum, and is used for fine furniture and turnery. The wood is strong, hard, durable and heavy and resistant to termites and wood borers. The spindle wood is very light, while the heartwood is dark yellow to reddish brown.

Olea europaea subsp. cuspidata produces edible fruit. They contain a biologically important oleanolic compound isolated from the chloroform extract (Anwar et al. 2013). The ripened fruits serve as a source of natural antioxidants due to their potential total phenolic compounds (Sharma et al. 2013). Traditionally in the Himalayas, the fruit of Olea europaea subsp. cuspidata has been used as medicine (Hassan et al. 2022).

This species is cultivated as an ornamental tree for parks and gardens. It is also used for the production of table olives and oil. The sap of the fruit of this tree can also be used to make ink.

== Taxonomy ==
Olea europaea subsp. cuspidata is widely distributed, diverged early, and is genetically most distinct of the wild olives. DNA analysis has suggested that subsp. cuspidata is not monophyletic and is sister to the other 5 subspecies of Olea europaea. Samples of subsp. cuspidata from Africa and Arabia have been found to be divergent from other accessions, leading to the proposal of an additional O. europaea subspecies ferruginea.

== Gallery ==
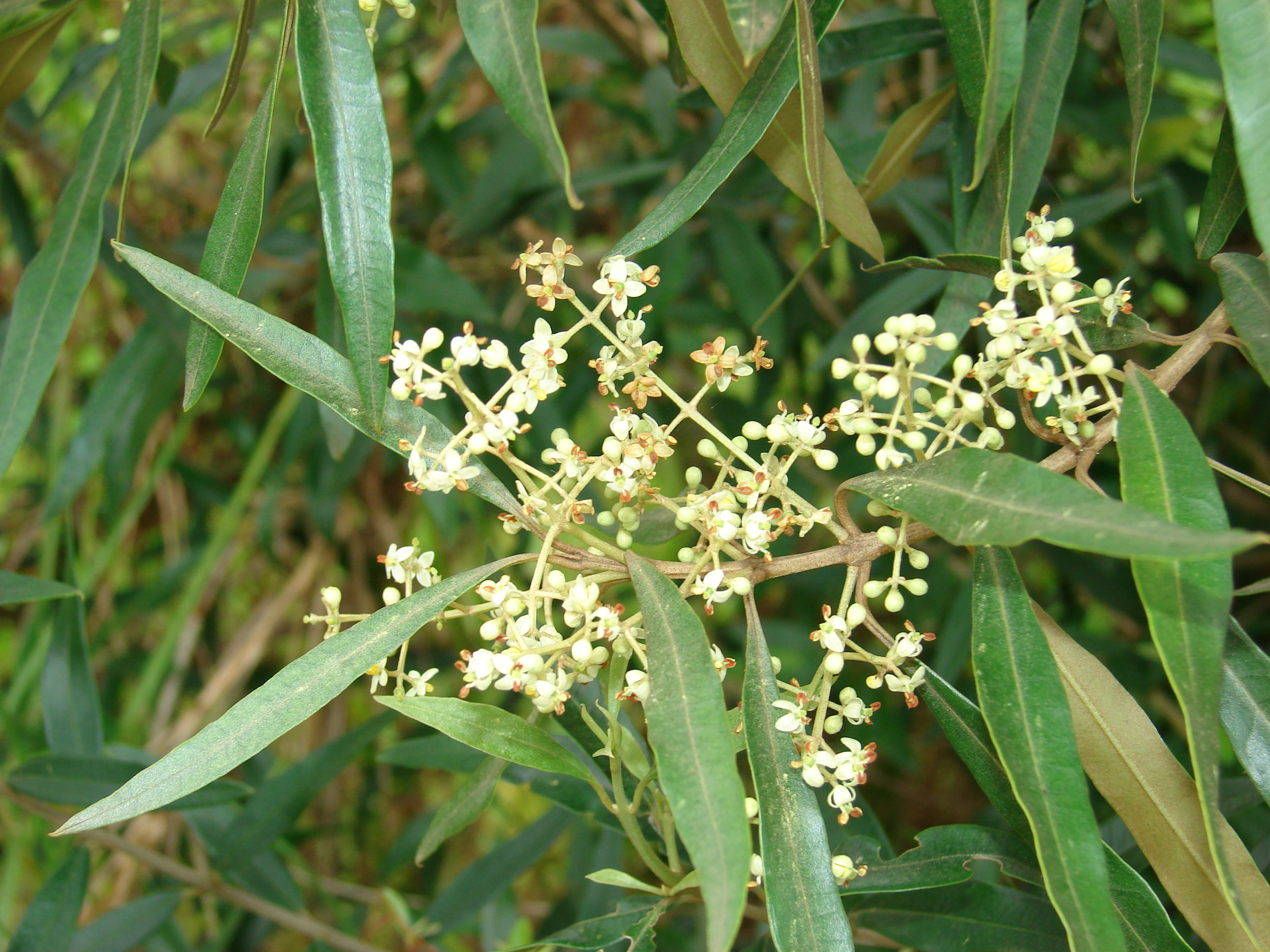
Flowers

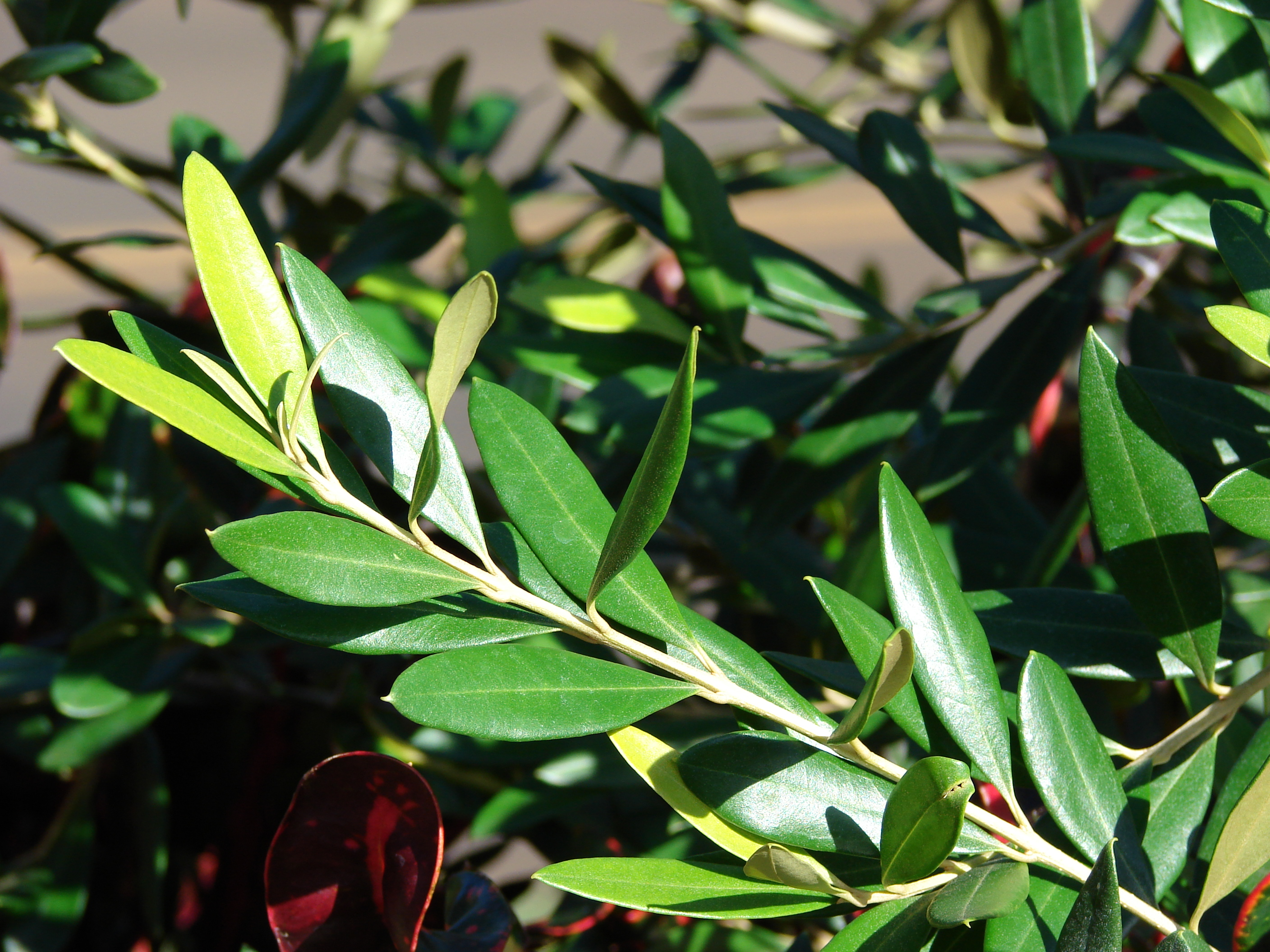
Leaves

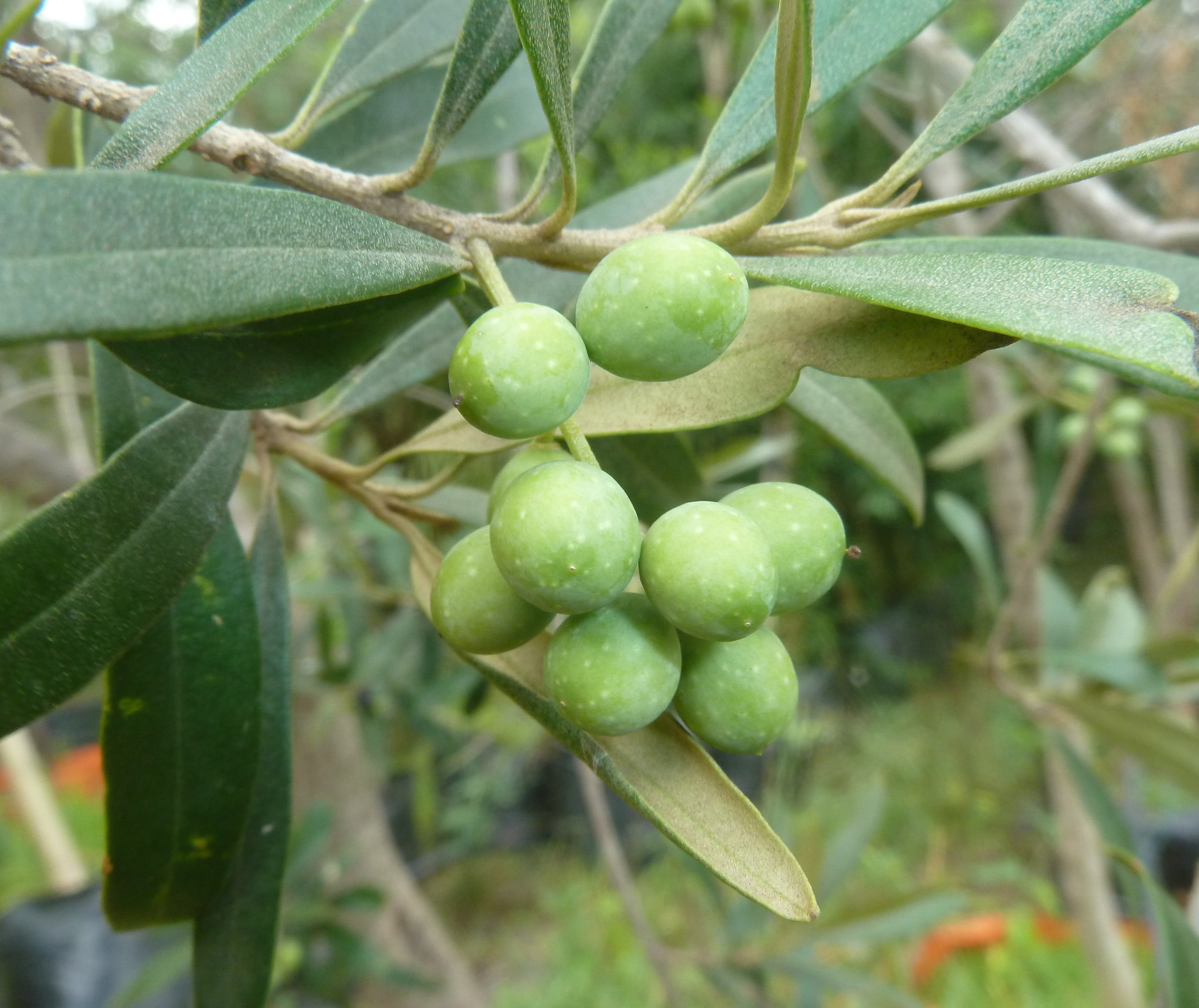
Unripe fruit

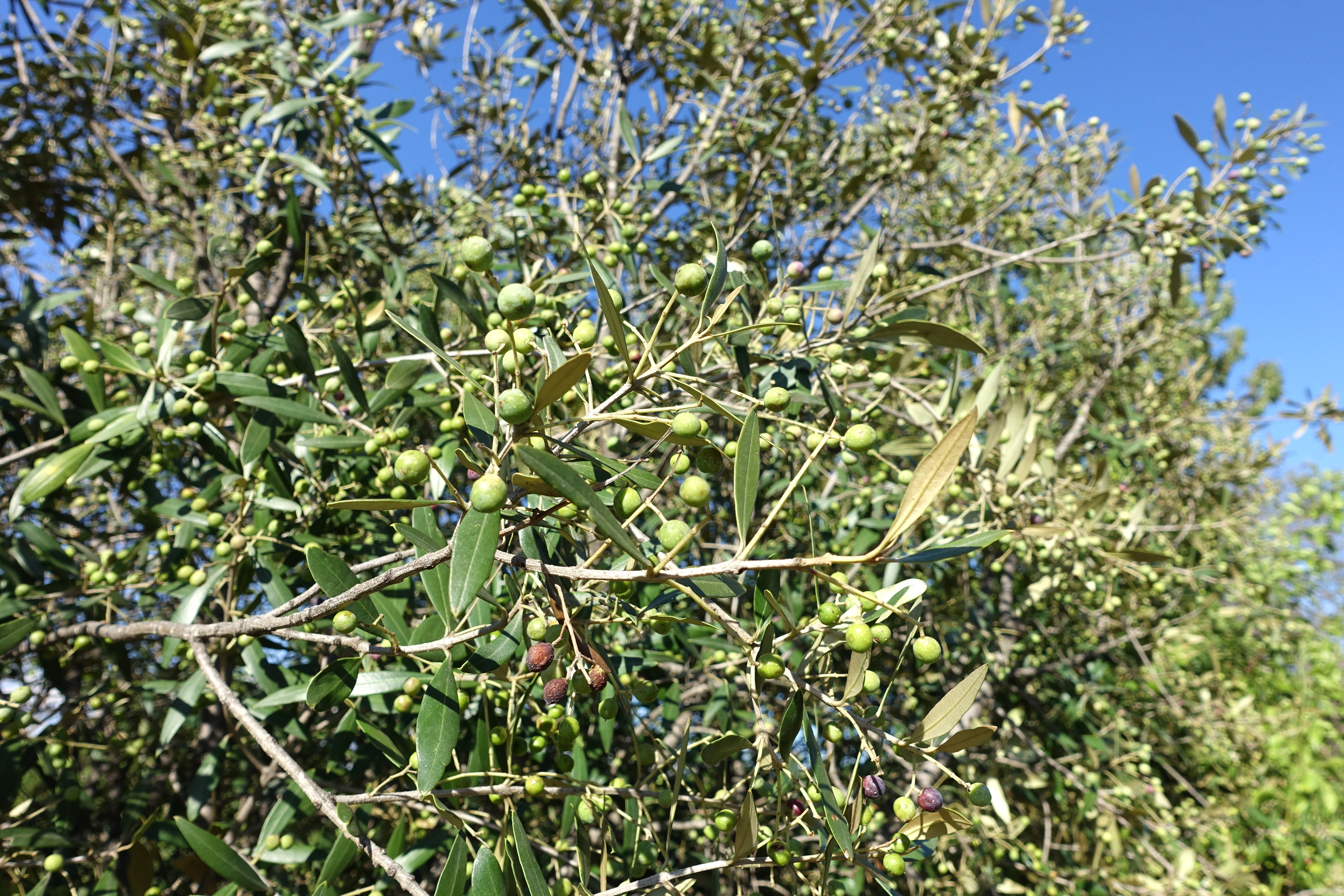
Jardí Botànic de Barcelona

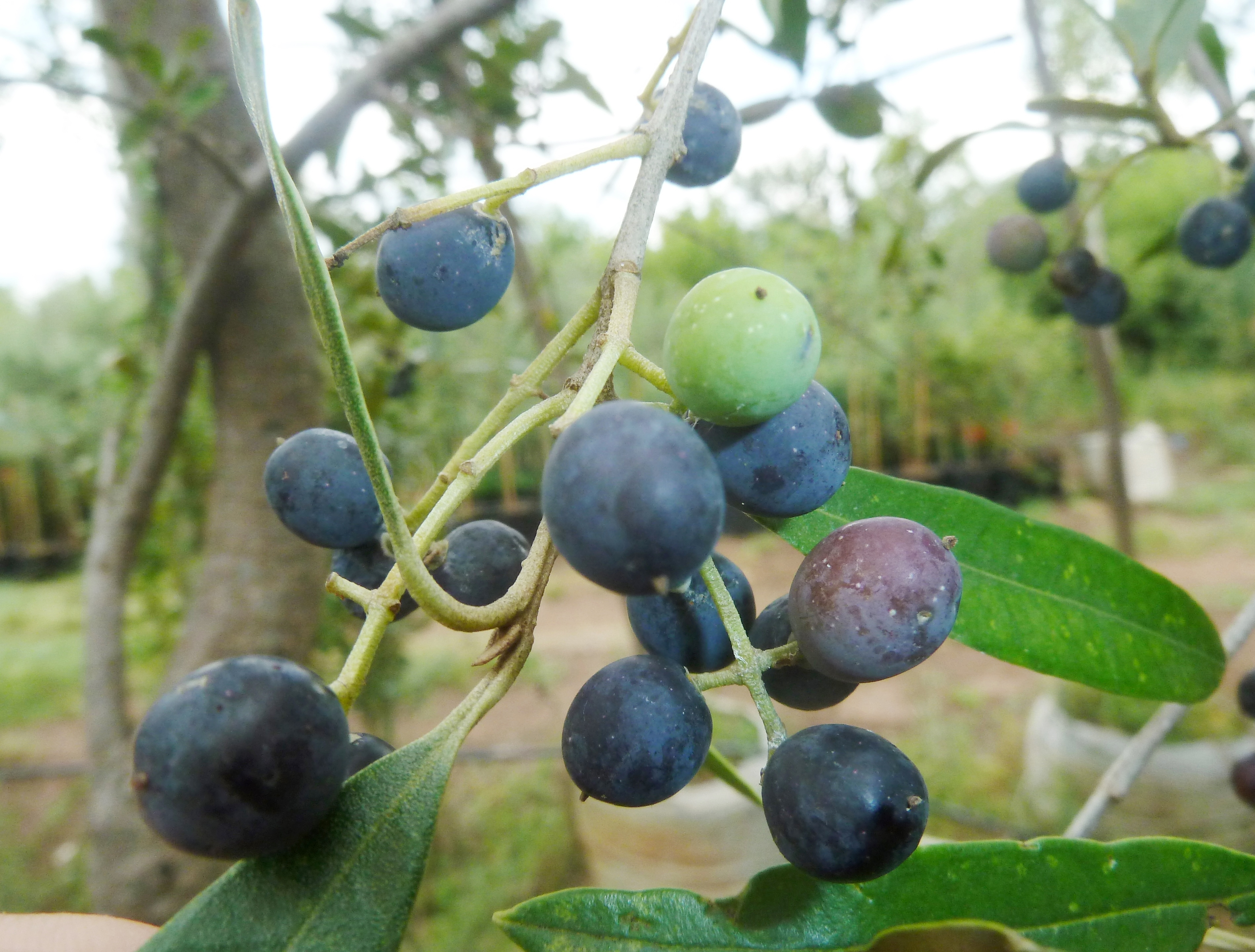
Ripe fruit (dark purple)

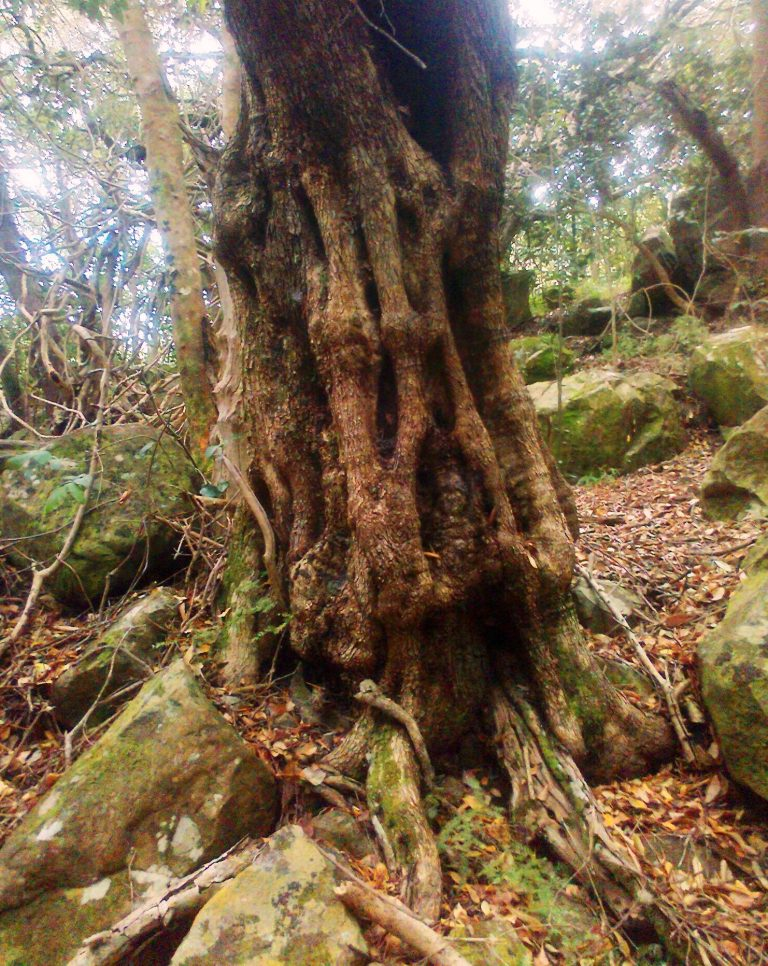
Trunk of old tree

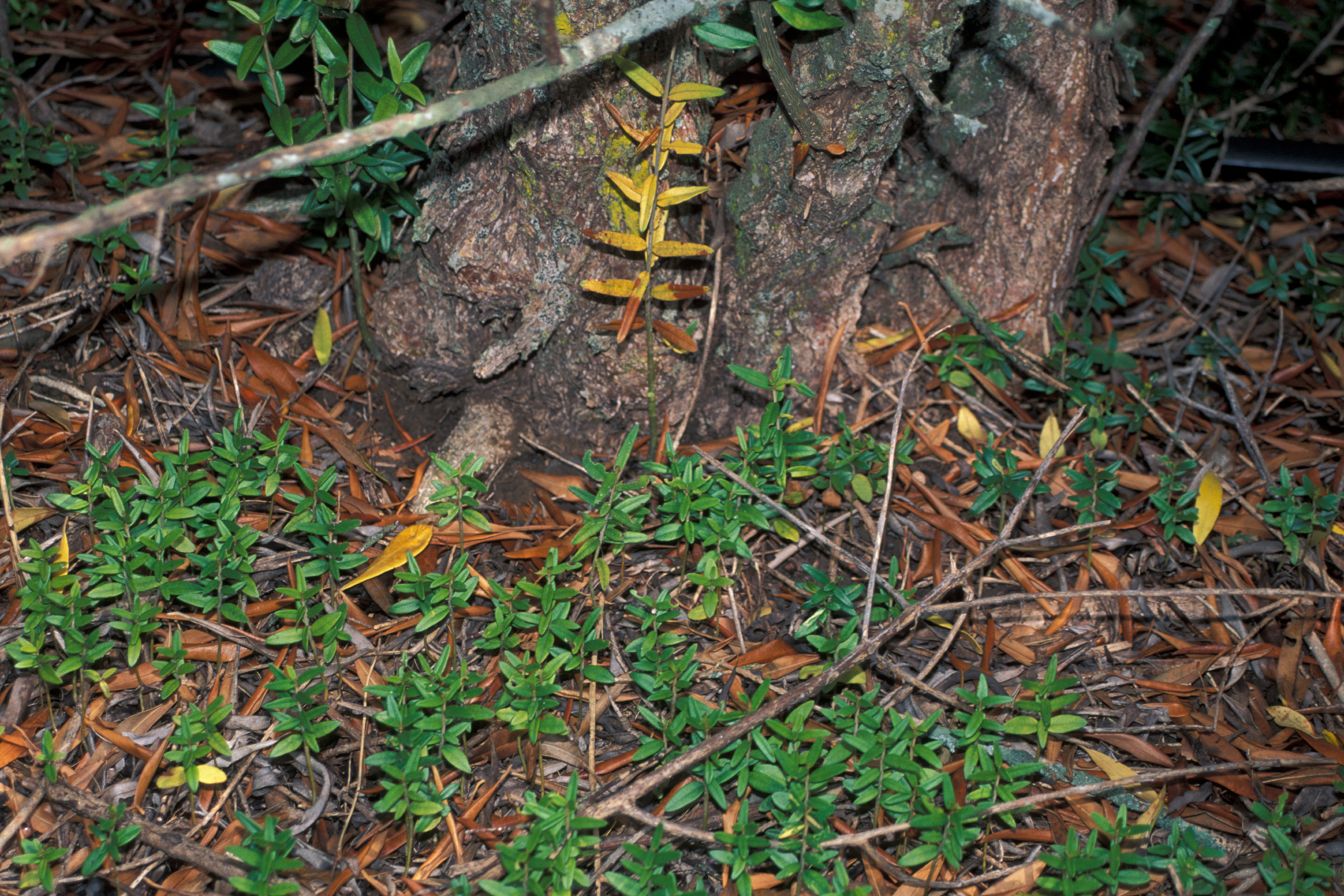
Seedling infestation
