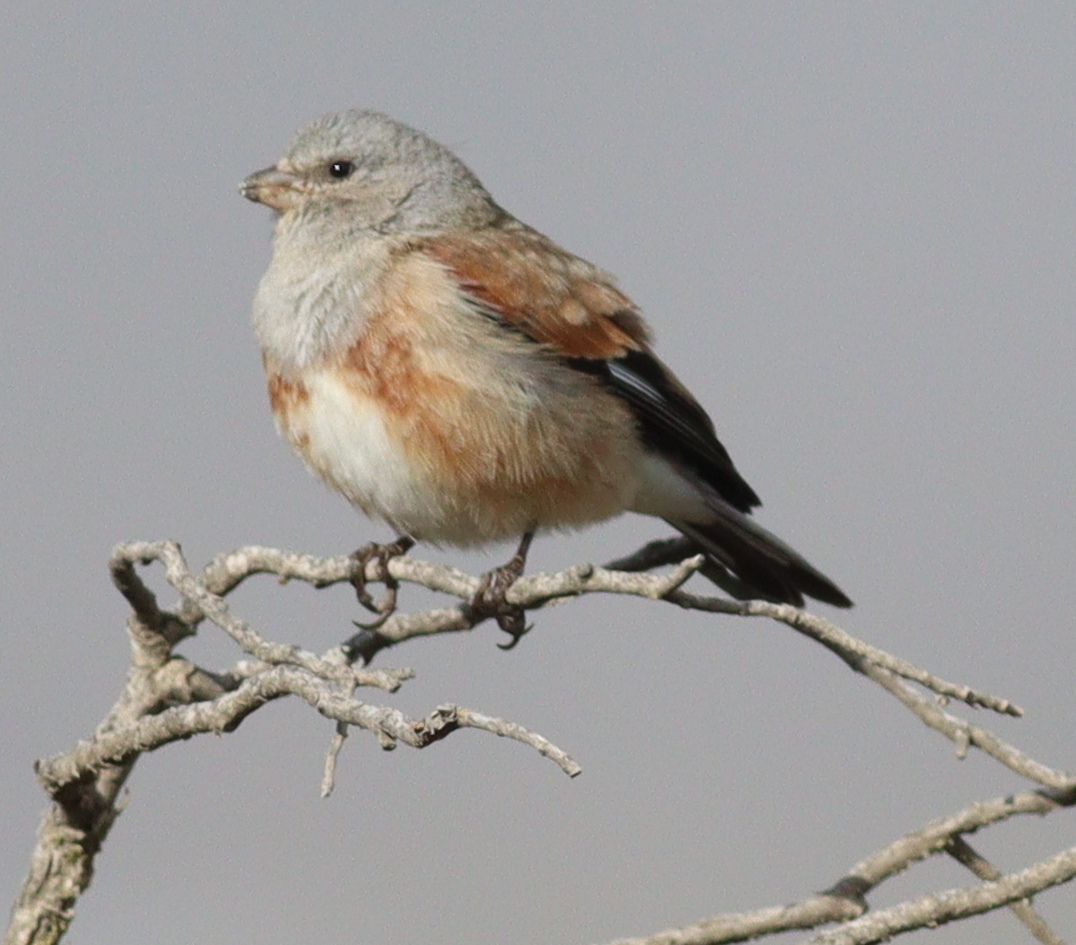

Conservation status
- Least Concern (IUCN 3.1)

Scientific classification
- Kingdom: Animalia
- Phylum: Chordata
- Class: Aves
- Order: Passeriformes
- Family: Fringillidae
- Subfamily: Carduelinae
- Genus: Linaria
- Species: L. yemenensis

Binomial name
- Linaria yemenensis (Ogilvie-Grant, 1913)

= Yemen linnet =

Species of bird

The Yemen linnet (Linaria yemenensis) is a species of finch in the family Fringillidae. It is native to the Southwestern Arabian foothills savanna (Saudi Arabia and Yemen). Its natural habitat is subtropical or tropical dry shrubland.

The Yemen linnet has not yet been examined genetically; it was formerly placed in the genus Carduelis but was assigned to the genus Linaria based on its plumage similarities to the common linnet Linaria cannabina.
