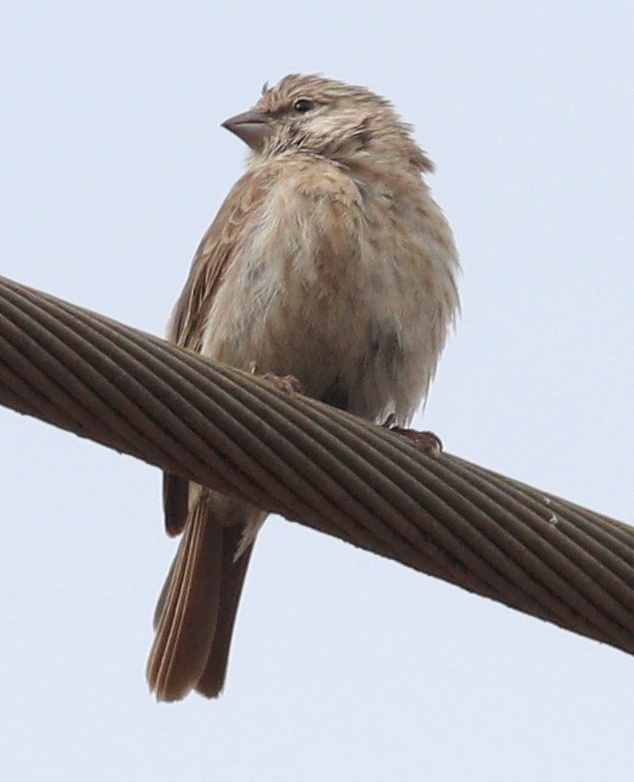

Conservation status
- Least Concern (IUCN 3.1)

Scientific classification
- Kingdom: Animalia
- Phylum: Chordata
- Class: Aves
- Order: Passeriformes
- Family: Fringillidae
- Subfamily: Carduelinae
- Genus: Crithagra
- Species: C. menachensis

Binomial name
- Crithagra menachensis (Ogilvie-Grant, 1913)

Synonyms
- Serinus menachensis

= Yemen serin =

Species of bird

The Yemen serin (Crithagra menachensis) is a species of finch in the family Fringillidae. It is found in Oman, Saudi Arabia, and Yemen.

The Yemen serin was formerly placed in the genus Serinus but phylogenetic analysis using mitochondrial and nuclear DNA sequences found that the genus was polyphyletic. The genus was therefore split and a number of species, including the Yemen serin were moved to the resurrected genus Crithagra.
