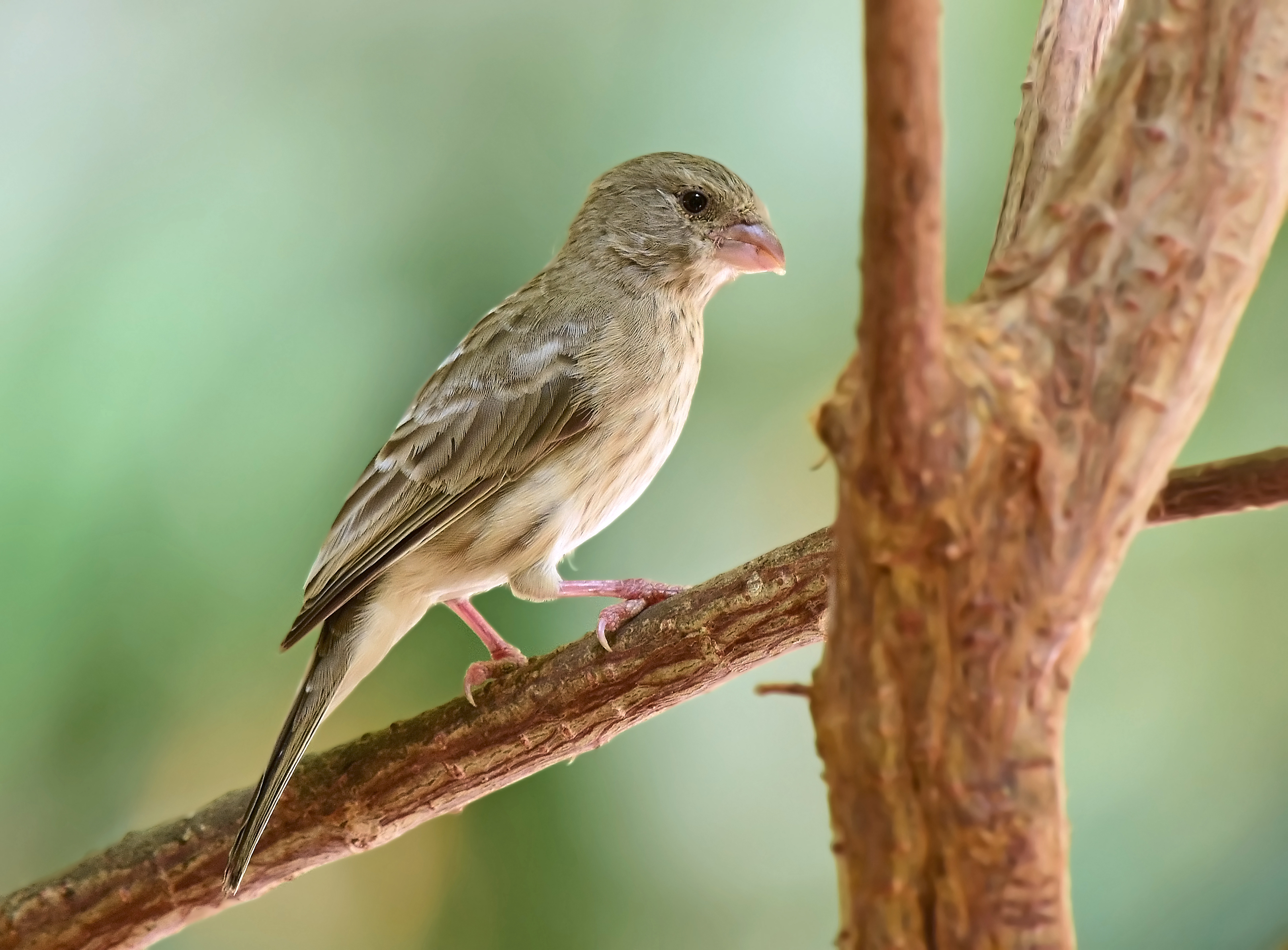

Conservation status
- Least Concern (IUCN 3.1)

Scientific classification
- Kingdom: Animalia
- Phylum: Chordata
- Class: Aves
- Order: Passeriformes
- Family: Fringillidae
- Subfamily: Carduelinae
- Genus: Crithagra
- Species: C. rothschildi

Binomial name
- Crithagra rothschildi (Ogilvie-Grant, 1902)

Synonyms
- Serinus rothschildi

= Arabian serin =

Species of bird

The Arabian serin (Crithagra rothschildi), also known as the olive-rumped serin, is a species of finch in the family Fringillidae. It is native to the Sarawat Mountains of western Saudi Arabia and Yemen. Its natural habitats are subtropical or tropical dry forest and subtropical or tropical dry shrubland.

The Arabian serin was formerly placed in the genus Serinus but phylogenetic analysis using mitochondrial and nuclear DNA sequences found that the genus was polyphyletic. The genus was therefore split and a number of species including the Arabian serin were moved to the resurrected genus Crithagra.
