= Asir National Park =

National park in Saudi Arabia

- Asir National Park
- IUCN category VI (protected area with sustainable use of natural resources)
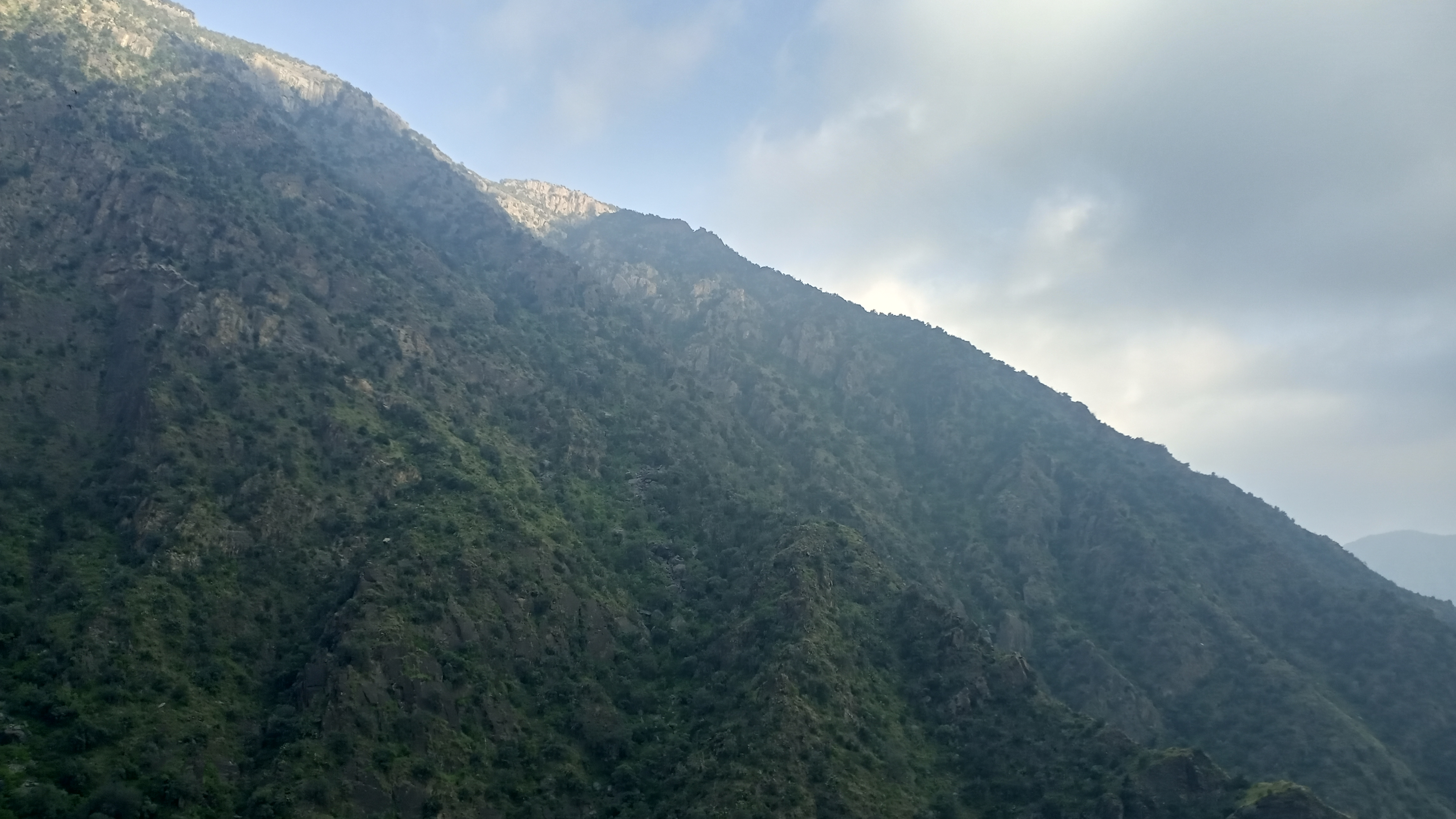
- Jabal Soudah in Asir National Park

- Location within Saudi Arabia Location within Middle East
- Nearest city: Abha
- Coordinates: 17°55′20″N 42°13′40″E
- Area: 6,490.7 km^{2} (2,506.1 sq mi)
- Max. elevation: 3200
- Min. elevation: 0
- Established: 1981

Asir National Park is a national park in Saudi Arabia's Asir Province. It was established in 1981.

== Geography ==
Asir National Park covers an area of 6490.7 km^{2}. It extends from Red Sea coast to the mountains, and includes both marine and terrestrial areas.

The park includes a portion of the Tihamah coastal plain, foothills underlain by granite and gneiss, the Asir escarpment dissected by deep wadis (canyons), and mountain peaks up to 3200 meters elevation.

== Climate ==
The climate varies with the altitudinal range of the park. The coastal portion of the ecoregion receives less than 100 mm of precipitation annually, and has a mean annual temperature of about 29 °C. Rainfall occurs mostly in two periods, the late winter-early spring and summer. The higher-altitude portions of the park receive less than 250 mm of annual rainfall, and have a mean annual temperature of about 19 °C.

== Flora ==
The park is home to several distinct plant communities. There are mangroves along the coast. The coastal plain is covered in sparse desert vegetation. The western foothills are home to Acacia woodlands and thorn scrub, including Acacia etbaica, Acacia asak, Acacia hamulosa, Acacia mellifera, Acacia johnwoodii, Acacia tortilis, Acacia seyal, and Acacia oerfota.

Above 1600 meters elevation, the Acacia woodlands transition to woodlands of Juniperus procera. The junipers form stands with Acacia origena, olive (Olea europaea) Nuxia oppositifolia, Maesa lanceolata, and Teclea nobilis at successively lower elevations on western slopes.
