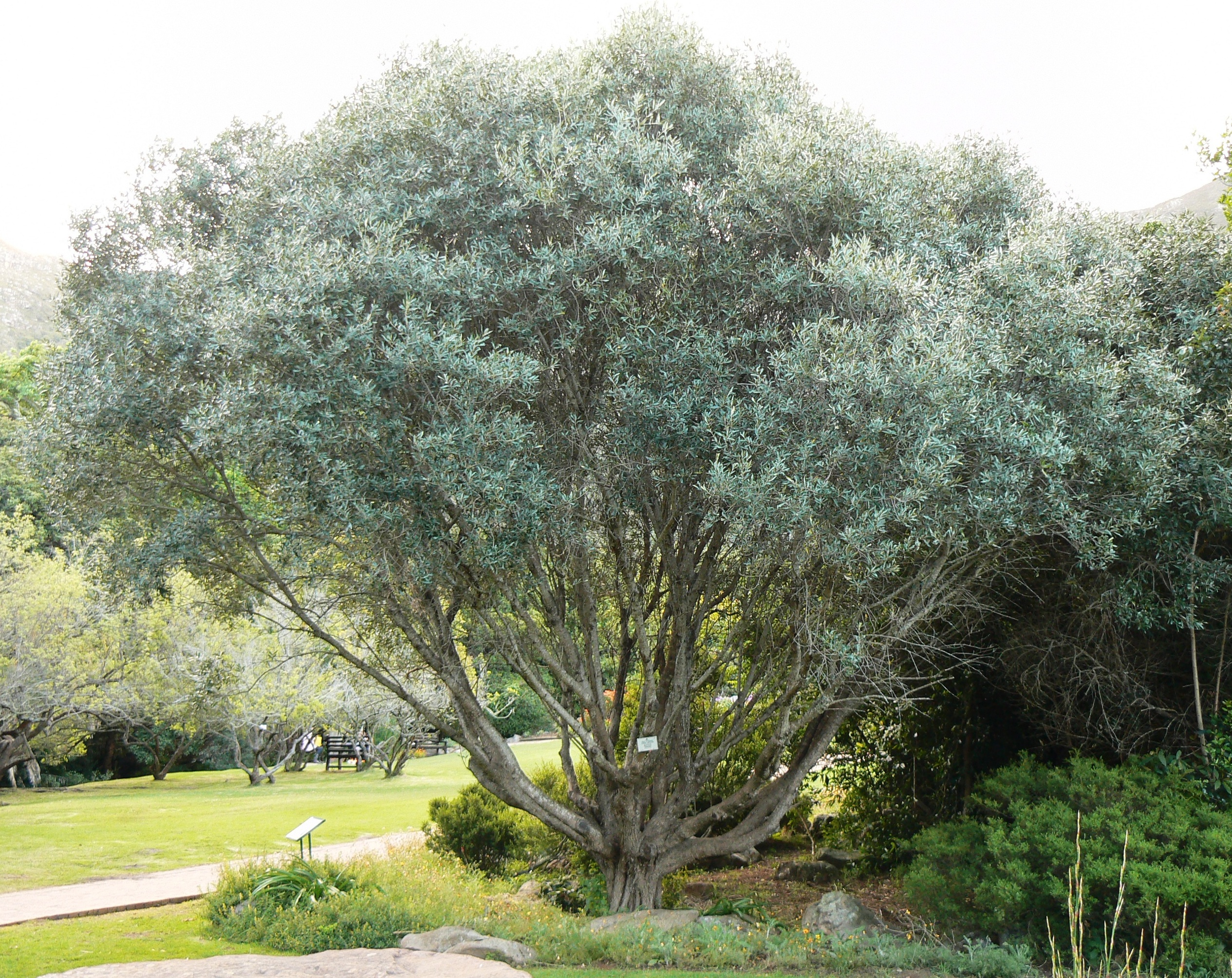

Conservation status
- Data Deficient (IUCN 3.1)

Scientific classification
- Kingdom: Plantae
- Clade: Tracheophytes
- Clade: Angiosperms
- Clade: Eudicots
- Clade: Asterids
- Order: Lamiales
- Family: Oleaceae
- Genus: Olea
- Species: O. europaea

Binomial name
- Olea europaea L.

= Olea europaea =

Olea europaea Temporal range: Late Pleistocene to recent, 0.06–0 Ma

Species of flowering plant

Olea europaea is the tree species that includes the cultivated olive, and five other subspecies. Some of the subspecies are polyploid.

== Taxonomy ==
The natural ranges of the subspecies of Olea europaea, and the introduced/naturalised range. Olea europea subsp. cuspidata (S. Africa to China) not shown.

The six natural subspecies of Olea europaea are distributed over a wide range:

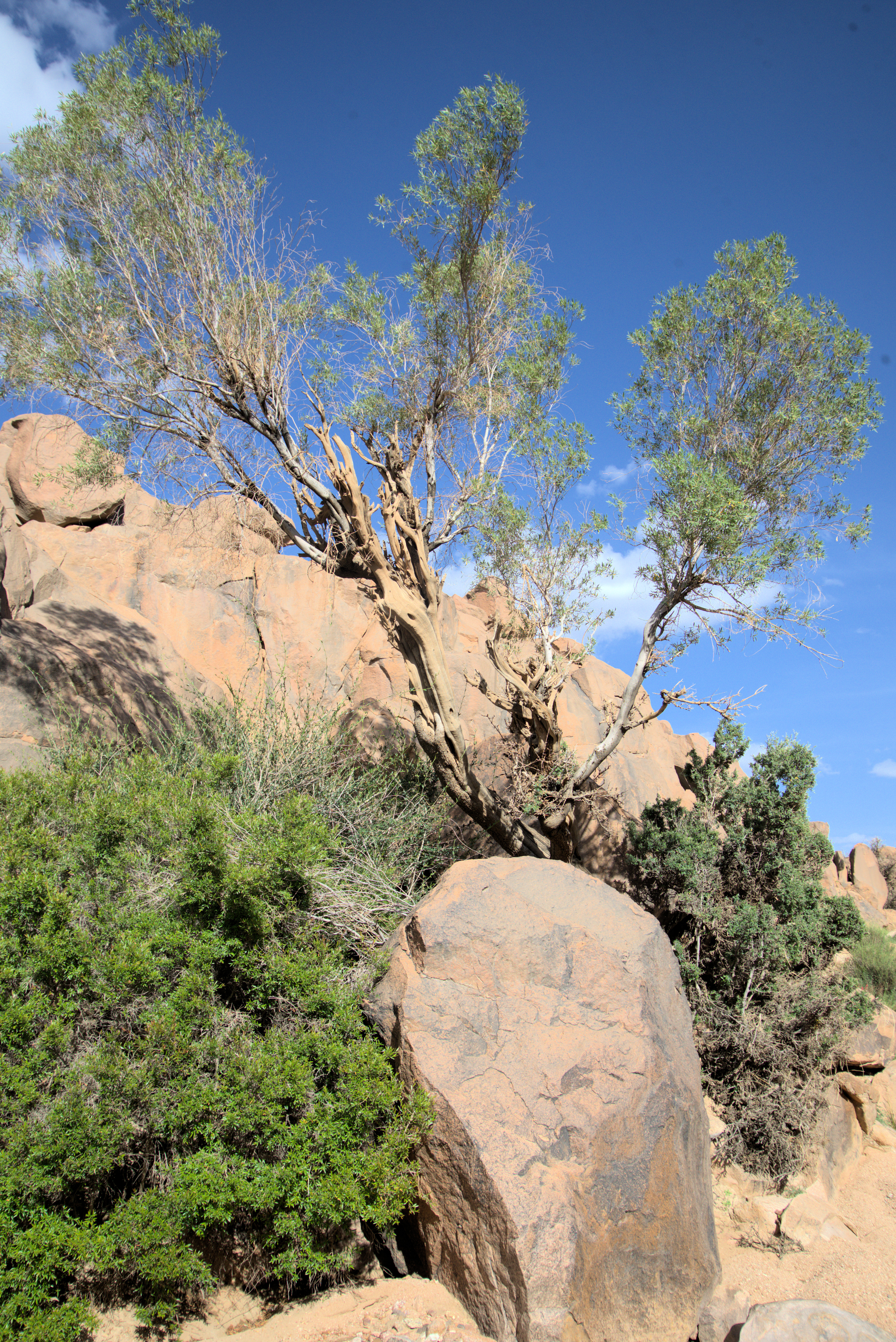
Olea europaea subsp. laperrinei in the Hoggar Mountains of Algeria

- Olea europea subsp. europaea (the cultivated olive, Mediterranean Basin) is divided into two varieties, O. e. var. europaea, which was formerly named Olea sativa, with the seedlings called "olivasters", and O. e. var. silvestris, which corresponds to the old wildly-growing Mediterranean species O. oleaster, with the seedlings called "oleasters". O. e. var. sylvestris forms a smaller, shrubby tree that produces smaller fruit and leaves.
- Olea europea subsp. cuspidata (from South Africa throughout East Africa, Arabia, Northwest India to Southwest China)
- Olea europea subsp. cerasiformis (Madeira); also known as Olea maderensis
- Olea europea subsp. guanchica (Canary Islands)
- Olea europea subsp. laperrinei (Algeria, Sudan, Niger)
- Olea europea subsp. maroccana (Morocco)

Olea europea subsp. cerasiformis is tetraploid, and Olea europea subsp. maroccana is hexaploid. Wild-growing forms of the olive are sometimes treated as the species Olea oleaster, or "oleaster". The trees referred to as "white" and "black" olives in Southeast Asia are not actually olives but species of Canarium.
