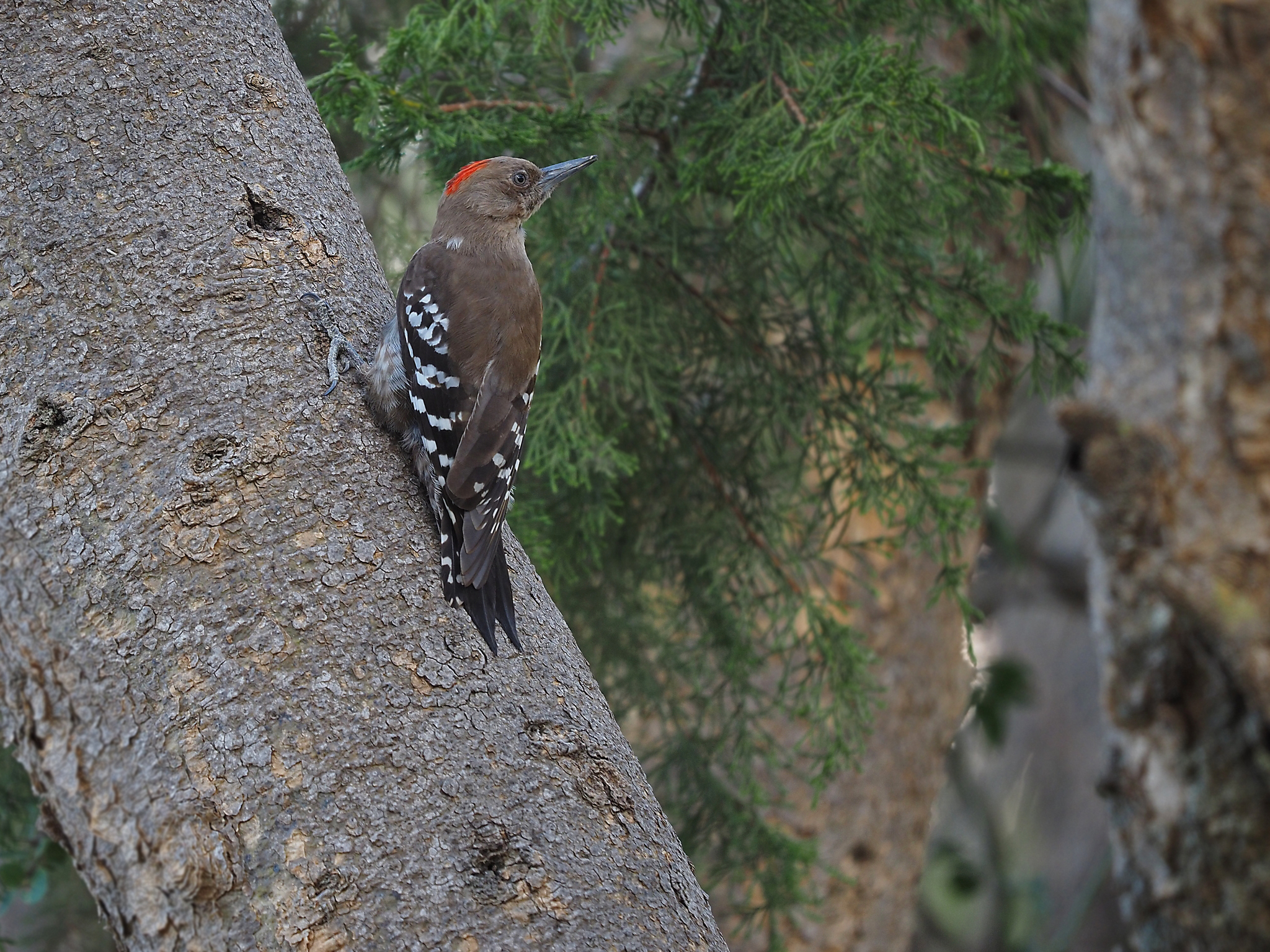

Conservation status
- Near Threatened (IUCN 3.1)

Scientific classification
- Kingdom: Animalia
- Phylum: Chordata
- Class: Aves
- Order: Piciformes
- Family: Picidae
- Genus: Dendrocoptes
- Species: D. dorae

Binomial name
- Dendrocoptes dorae (Bates & Kinnear, 1935)

Synonyms
- Dendropicos dorae Dendrocopos dorae

= Arabian woodpecker =

Species of bird

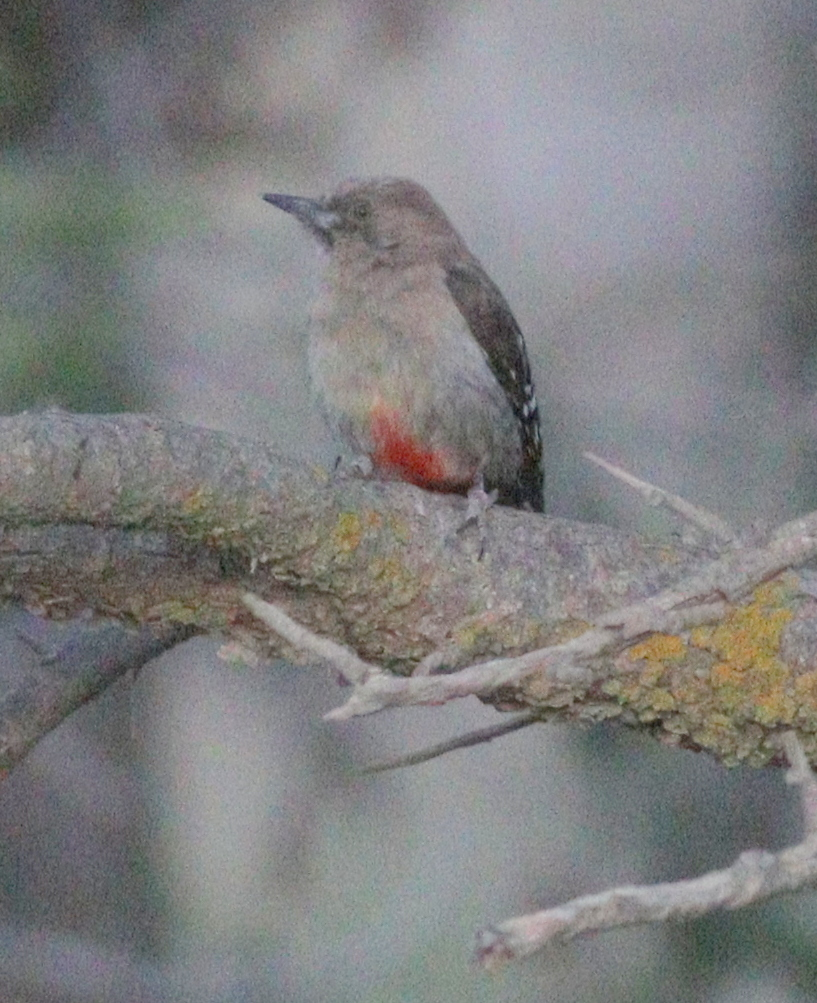
Grainy picture of the Arabian woodpecker perched on a tree branch.

The Arabian woodpecker (Dendrocoptes dorae) or Sarat woodpecker, is a bird species of the family Picidae, native to the Sarawat Mountains of Saudi Arabia and Yemen. It is the only woodpecker that breeds on the Arabian Peninsula.

This species was first described in 1935 by the American naturalist George Latimer Bates and the Scottish zoologist Norman Boyd Kinnear, the scientific name being proposed by their occasional co-worker, the British Arabist St John Philby, in honour of his wife Dora.

Some taxonomic authorities continue to place the species in Dendrocopos, while others place it genus Dendropicos.

== Description ==
The Arabian woodpecker grows to a length of about 18 cm (7 in). The male has a brownish or pale grey head with a bright red patch on the crown and nape. The back, wings, and tail are olive-grey to brown streaked with white, and the wings are barred with white. The underparts are grey streaked with white and the belly has the central area suffused with red. The female is similar but lacks the red crown patch. The call has been rendered as "pweek pit-pit-pit-pit-pit-pit-pit-ptptpt" and the bird occasionally drums on branches.

== Distribution and habitat ==
The species is endemic to the mountains and foothills of the southwestern part of the Arabian Peninsula, being restricted to southwestern Saudi Arabia and western Yemen. It is found in a range of woodland habitats including, at lower altitudes, patches of Ficus, date palm and Pandanus. It is present in evergreen riparian forested corridors, on shading trees in coffee plantations, in orchards, on terraced cropland with isolated trees, and in woods and spinneys of Acacia, juniper, olive and Dracaena. Its altitudinal range is from sea level to 2,800 m (9,200 ft) but it probably only breeds between about 400 and 2,400 m (1,300 and 7,900 ft).

== Behaviour ==
Like other woodpeckers, the Arabian woodpecker feeds on insect grubs which it extracts from holes in tree trunks and branches with its long tongue. It also feeds on spiders, aphids, fig-wasps and flying insects. The nest is in a hole in the trunk or branch of a tree, usually below 6 m (20 ft), excavated in dead wood. The main breeding season is from March to May, but a second brood is sometimes reared in November in Yemen.

== Status ==
D. dorae is an uncommon bird, and the total number of mature individuals is estimated to be less than ten thousand. The population trend is probably downward as the bird's habitat is being degraded by the removal of trees for firewood and charcoal manufacture, and the clearance of wooded land for agriculture. Overgrazing by livestock means there is little regeneration of trees in some areas. For these reasons, the International Union for Conservation of Nature has assessed this bird's conservation status as "Near Threatened".
