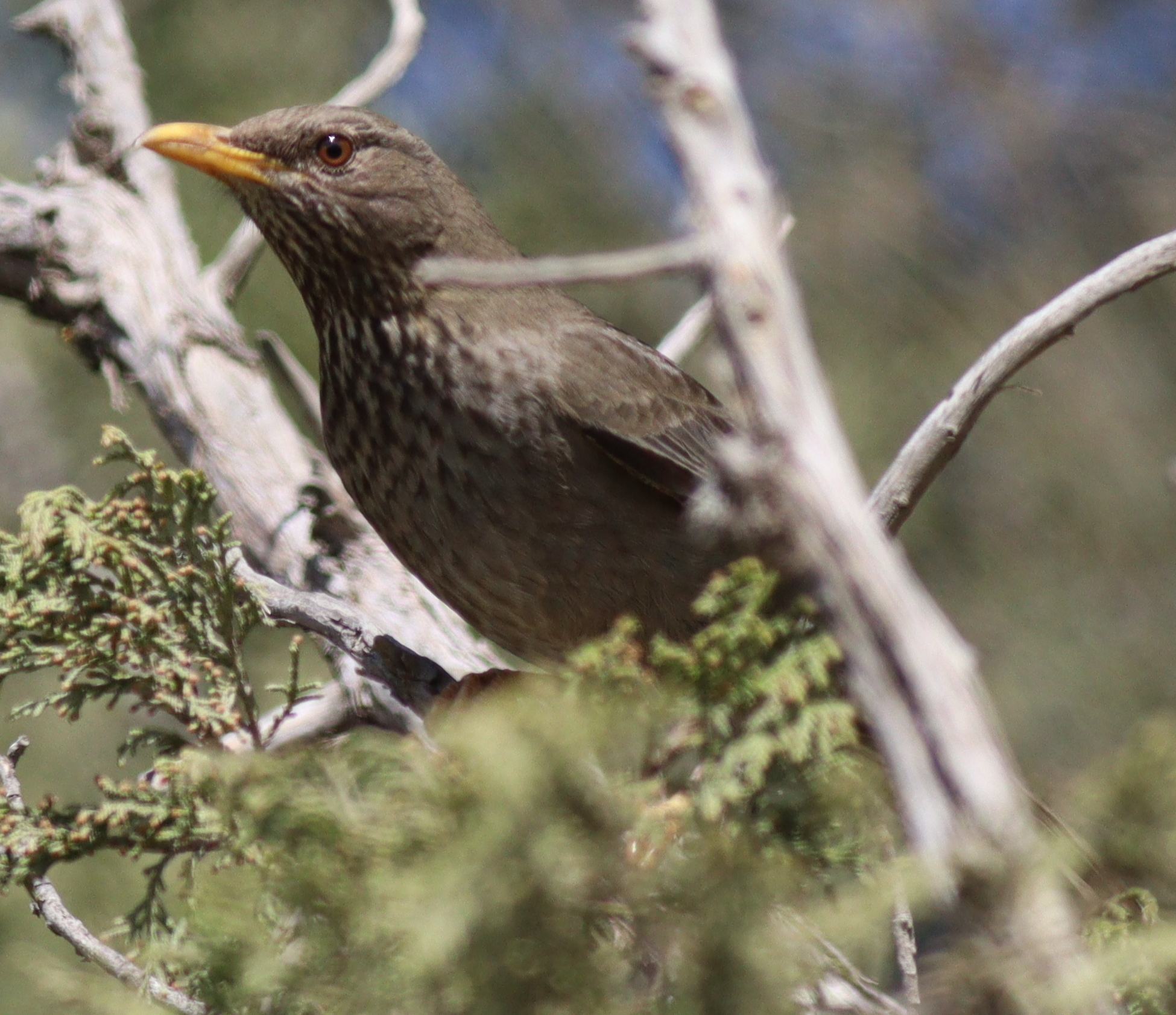

Conservation status
- Near Threatened (IUCN 3.1)

Scientific classification
- Kingdom: Animalia
- Phylum: Chordata
- Class: Aves
- Order: Passeriformes
- Family: Turdidae
- Genus: Turdus
- Species: T. menachensis

Binomial name
- Turdus menachensis Ogilvie-Grant, 1913
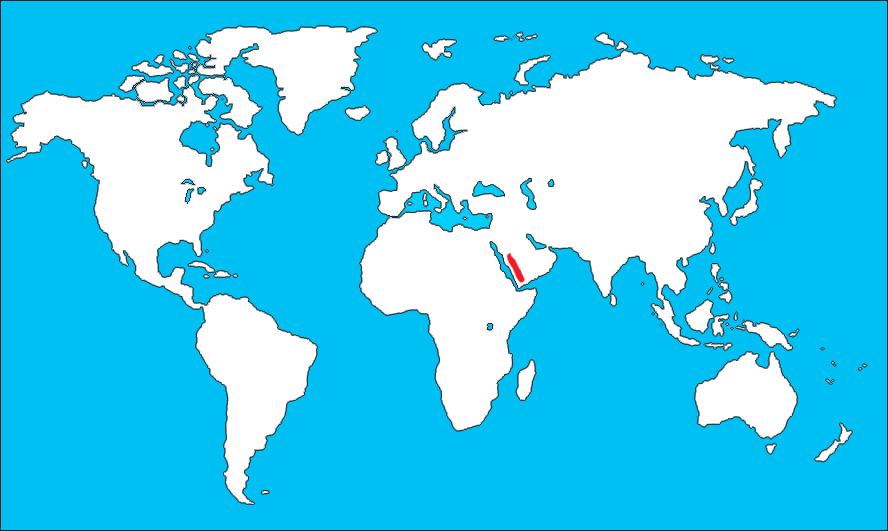

= Yemen thrush =

Species of bird

The Yemen thrush (Turdus menachensis) is a species of bird in the thrush family Turdidae. It is native to the Sarawat Mountains of the western Arabian Peninsula.
