= South Arabian plains and plateau desert =

Ecoregion in the Arabian Peninsula

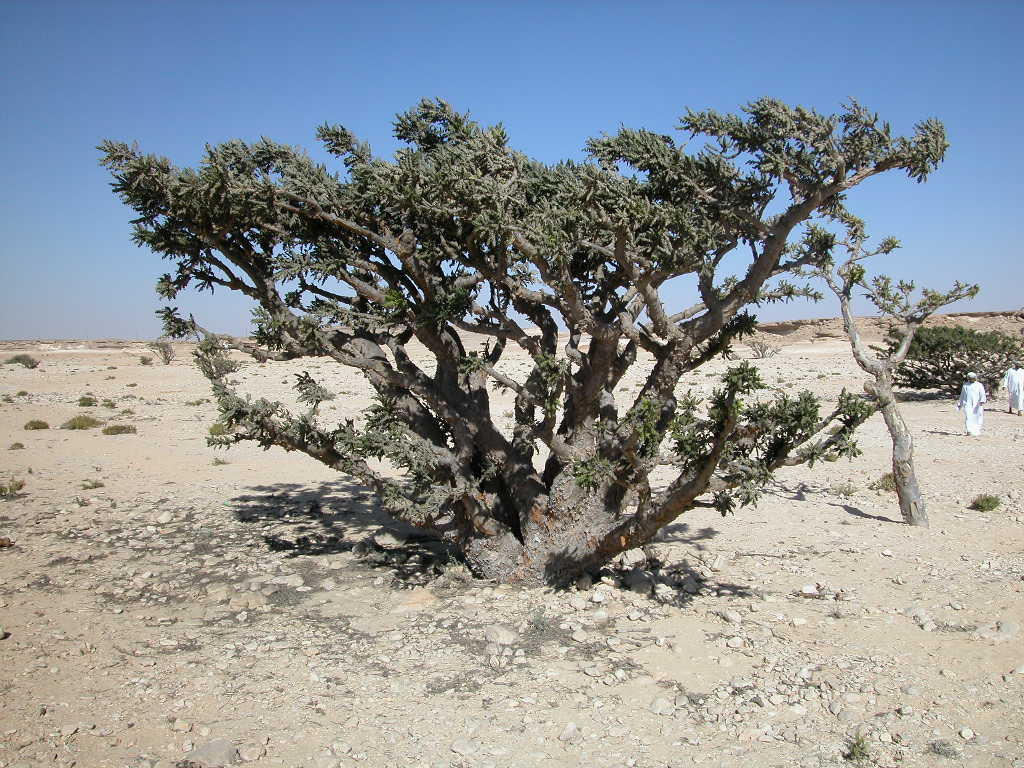
- Frankincense trees (Prosopis cineraria) in Oman

Ecology
- Realm: Palearctic
- Biome: Deserts and xeric shrublands
- Borders: List: Al-Hajar foothill xeric woodlands and shrublands; Arabian Desert; Arabian-Persian Gulf coastal plain desert; Arabian sand desert; East Arabian fog shrublands and sand desert; South Arabian fog woodlands, shrublands, and dune; Southwest Arabian coastal xeric shrublands

Geography
- Area: 37,328 km^{2} (14,412 sq mi)
- Countries: Oman; Saudi Arabia; United Arab Emirates; Yemen

The South Arabian plains and plateau desert is a deserts and xeric shrubland ecoregion in the southern Arabian Peninsula, covering portions of Oman, Saudi Arabia, the United Arab Emirates, and Yemen. The ecoregion has a total area of 37,328 km^{2}.

The region encompasses arid plains and plateaus bounded on the north by the hyper-arid Arabian Desert, on the east by the Al Hajar Mountains in Oman and the UAE, and in the west by the Sarawat Mountains of Saudi Arabia and Yemen. The Arabian Sea coast to the south is fringed with distinct coastal and fog desert ecoregions – the East Arabian fog shrublands and sand desert, which includes the Wahiba Sands, in eastern and central Oman, and the South Arabian fog woodlands, shrublands, and dune and Southwest Arabian coastal xeric shrublands in Yemen and the Dhofar region of western Oman.

The ecoregion includes the Hadhramaut plateau in Yemen and western Oman and the Jiddat al-Harasis plateau in central Oman. These plateaus are dissected by wadis, valleys with intermittent watercourses.

In the east it includes the gently-sloping pediment of the Al Hajar Mountains in Oman and the UAE. The pediment is covered in gravels eroded from the eastern and southern slopes of range and drained by a series of wadis which run west or southwest from the mountain flanks. The Wahiba Sands, a large dune field in eastern Oman lying south of the Al Hajar Mountains, bounds the ecoregion on the east.

== Climate ==
The ecoregion has a hot desert climate, with summer temperatures up to 47°C in parts of Oman, and temperatures of about 25°C in the during the coolest months. Average annual rainfall is generally less than 50 mm, mostly from moisture-bearing winds from the Arabian Sea.

== Flora ==
Plant communities include shrublands, grasslands, and woodlands. Acacias, including species of Acacia and Vachellia, are the dominant trees. Ground cover includes grasses, principally Stipagrostis sokotrana, sedges, and shrubs including Convolvulus oppositifolius. The eastern outwash plains are covered in sparse grassland dotted with Vachellia tortilis trees and shrubs. Relict woodlands of ghaf (Prosopis cineraria) grow in sandy wadi channels which collect subsurface water.

The desert of western Oman is mostly treeless, with species of Zygophyllum and Haloxylon salicornicum the most common shrubs. Boswellia sacra, a shrub or tree native to interior Dhofar and eastern Mahra, is the source of the aromatic resin frankincense, which has been harvested and traded for millennia.

An estimated 35% of species in Oman's central desert are endemic.

== Fauna ==
Native mammals include the Nubian ibex, sand gazelle, caracal, Arabian wolf, honey badger, and cape hare. The Arabian oryx was re-introduced to Oman's Al Wusta Wildlife Reserve in the 1980s after it became extinct in the wild. Desert-breeding birds include the spotted thick-knee (Burhinus capensis) and crowned sandgrouse (Pterocles coronatus).

== Population ==
The interior of the region is sparsely populated, mostly by nomadic pastoralists. Al Ain in the UAE is the largest of the ecoregion's few towns.

== Conservation and threats ==
Overgrazing and firewood cutting have reduced and altered the native vegetation cover. Other threats include overhunting, over-exploitation of surface and groundwater, and damage to the land from oil extraction.

The ecoregion has few protected areas. Al Wusta Wildlife Reserve in Oman includes a portion of the Jiddat al Harrasis plateau, and is where the Arabian oryx was reintroduced. In 2007 the Government of Oman reduced the size of the reserve by 90% to open the area for oil exploration, which prompted UNESCO to withdraw the reserve's World Heritage Site status the same year. The Eastern Najed and Jebel Samhan reserves in Oman's Dhofar Governorate protect portions of the ecoregion as well as the adjacent coastal fog woodlands.

== Delineation ==
The South Arabian plains and plateau desert was designated a distinct ecoregion by Dinerstein et al. in their 2017 revision of the Earth's terrestrial ecoregions. In the 2001 ecoregion scheme by Olson et al., the region was divided among the Arabian Desert, Red Sea Nubo–Sindian tropical desert and semi-desert, Gulf of Oman desert and semi-desert, and Southwestern Arabian foothills savanna ecoregions.
