= East Arabian fog shrublands and sand desert =

Ecoregion in Oman

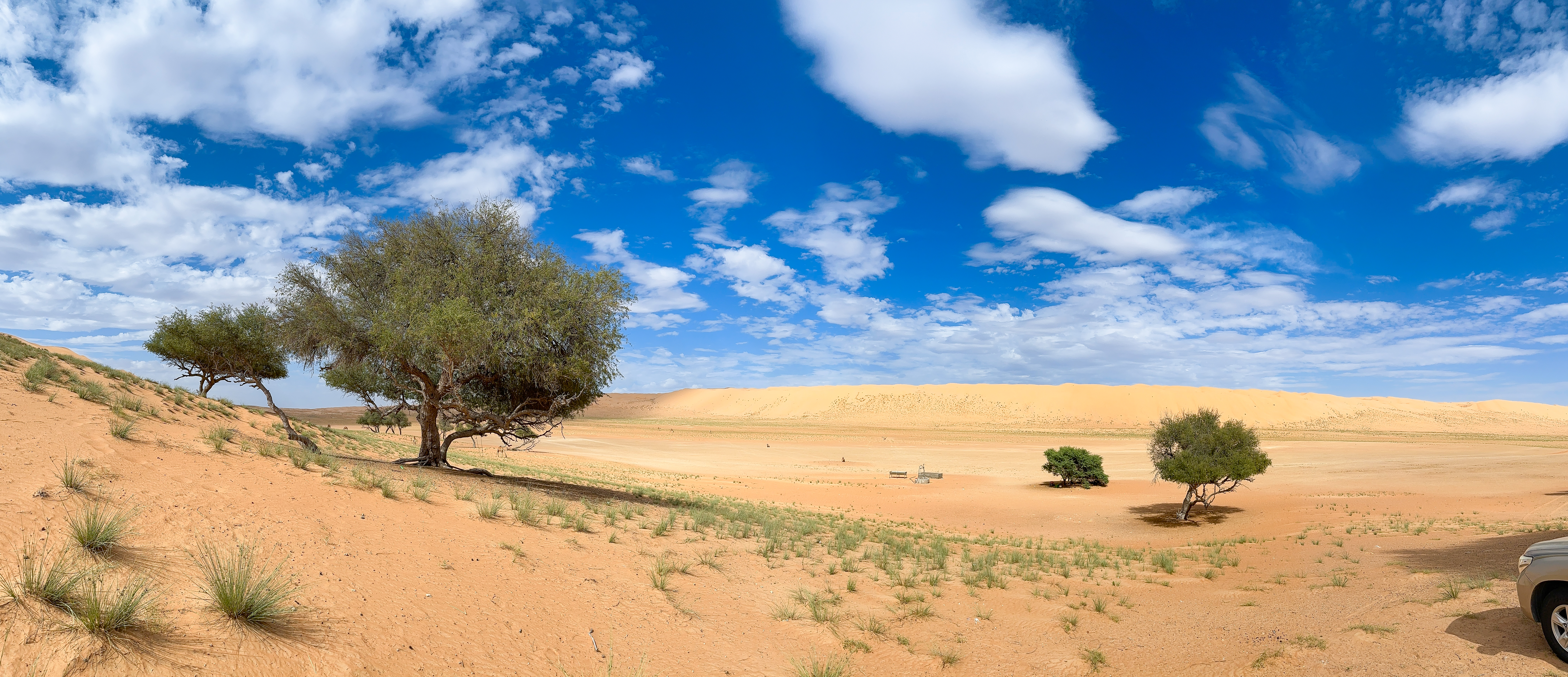
- Wahiba Sands in Bidiya

Ecology
- Realm: Palearctic
- Biome: Deserts and xeric shrublands
- Borders: Al-Hajar foothill xeric woodlands and shrublands; Arabian-Persian Gulf coastal plain desert; South Arabian plains and plateau desert

Geography
- Area: 1,769 km^{2} (683 sq mi)
- Country: Oman

The East Arabian fog shrublands and sand desert is a deserts and xeric shrubland ecoregion in Oman. It encompasses two areas of coastal desert in the eastern Arabian Peninsula, the Wahiba Sands in eastern Oman, and the Huqf region to the southwest. The ecoregion has a total area of 1,769 km^{2}.

The northern section encompasses the Wahiba Sands, a dune field that extends inland from the Arabian Sea coast. The southern section, known as the Huqf region, is bounded on the east by the Arabian Sea and on the west by the Huqf escarpment and Jiddat al-Harasis plateau. The Huqf region's landscape is more varied, with gravel deserts, salt flats or ‘sabkha’, rugged hills and outcrops, and coastal white sugar dunes near Al Khaluf.

== Climate ==
The region has a desert climate, with less than 50 mm of rainfall annually. Temperatures are warm throughout the year, reaching up to 40 °C in the warmer summer months and averaging 25 °C in the winter months. The region has a strong marine influence, with moisture-bearing winds from the Arabian Sea in winter and the southwest monsoon in summer that form fogs which provide moisture to plants from condensation.

== Flora ==
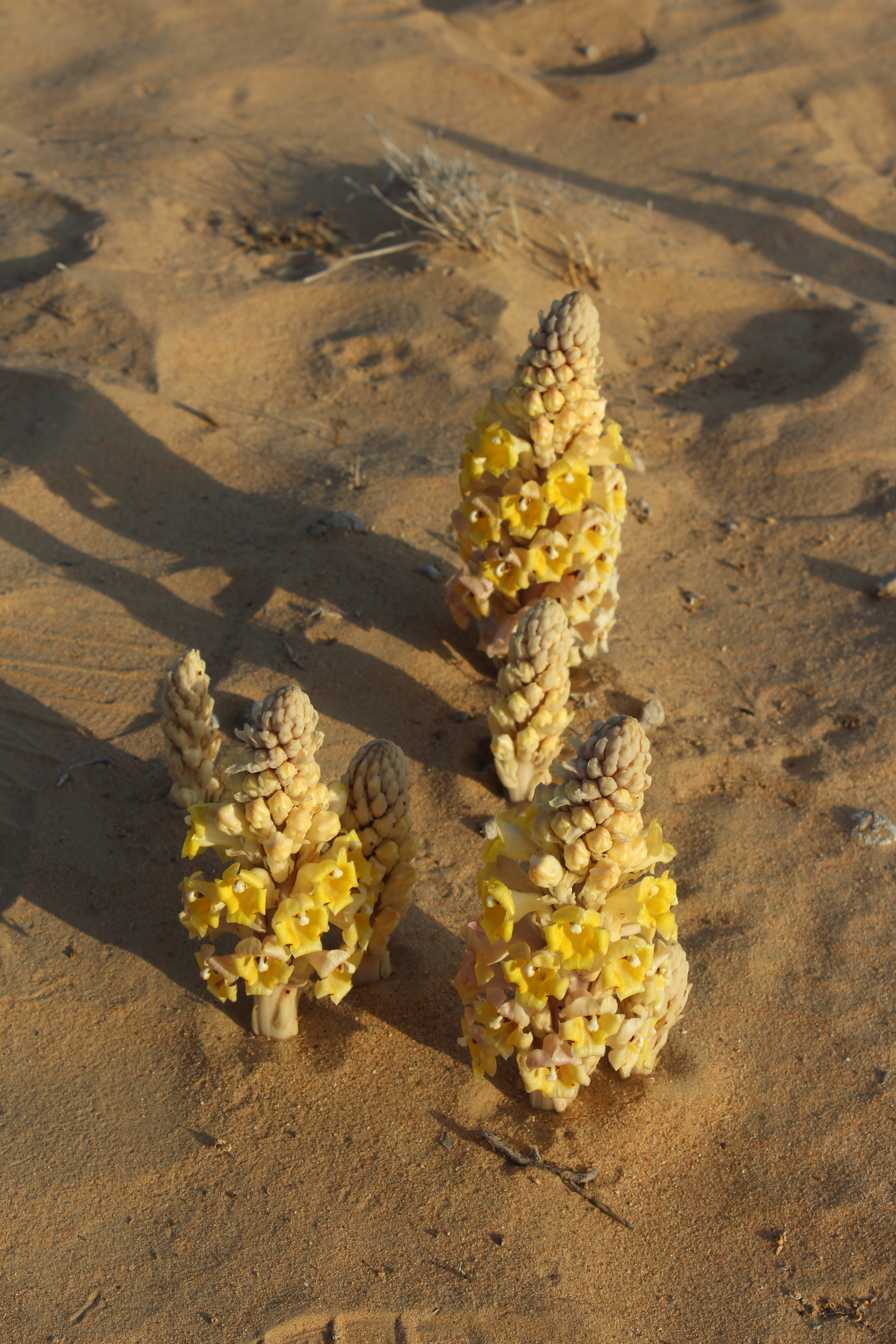
Cistanche tubulosa in the Huqf region

The vegetation consists mostly of sparse shrubs and ephemeral grasses, with areas of open woodland. Calligonum spp. shrubs and sedges grow on mobile dune tops, and the subshrub Heliotropium bacciferum subsp. tuberculosum on grows on stabilized sands. The subshrubs sea-lavender (Limonium spp.) and Zygophyllum qatarense grow on the seashore in the northern part of the ecoregion, while the shrub Halopeplis perfoliata and the grasses Urochondra setulosa and sand couch (Sporobolus virginicus) predominate along the southern coast.

Ghaf trees (Prosopis cineraria) form open woodlands, which provide habitat for many of the region's native birds and mammals.

== Fauna ==
Native mammals include the Cape hare (Lepus capensis), Arabian gazelle (Gazella arabica), sand cat (Felis margarita), Rüppell's fox (Vulpes rueppellii), and Arabian wolf (Canis lupus arabs). Nubian ibex (Capra nubiana) and Blanford's fox (Vulpes cana) dwell along the Huqf escarpment.

Resident and migratory birds live in the woodlands and dune scrub, and the coastal dunes are important stopovers for migratory birds.

== Delineation ==
The East Arabian fog shrublands and sand desert was designated a distinct ecoregion by Dinerstein et al. in their 2017 revision of the Earth's terrestrial ecoregions. In the 2001 ecoregion scheme by Olson et al. the Wahiba Sands were part of the Arabian Desert ecoregion, while the Huqf region was divided between the Arabian Peninsula coastal fog desert and Red Sea Nubo–Sindian tropical desert and semi-desert ecoregions.

== Conservation and threats ==
The Ash Sharqiyah Sand Reserve protects most of the Wahiba Sands. The Al Wusta Wildlife Reserve protects a portion of the Huqf region and Huqf escarpment, and of the upland South Arabian plains and plateau desert on the Jiddat al-Harasis plateau.
