= Yaaloni =

Village in Oman

Coordinates: 19.944°N 57.103°E

Yaaloni (or Jalooni) is a small village situated next to the Empty Quarter in Oman at an altitude of 153 meters. It is the site of a temperature monitoring station that has recorded temperatures of over 50° C. The Arabian Oryx Sanctuary, a former UNESCO World Heritage Site, is at the village.
