= Former World Heritage Sites =

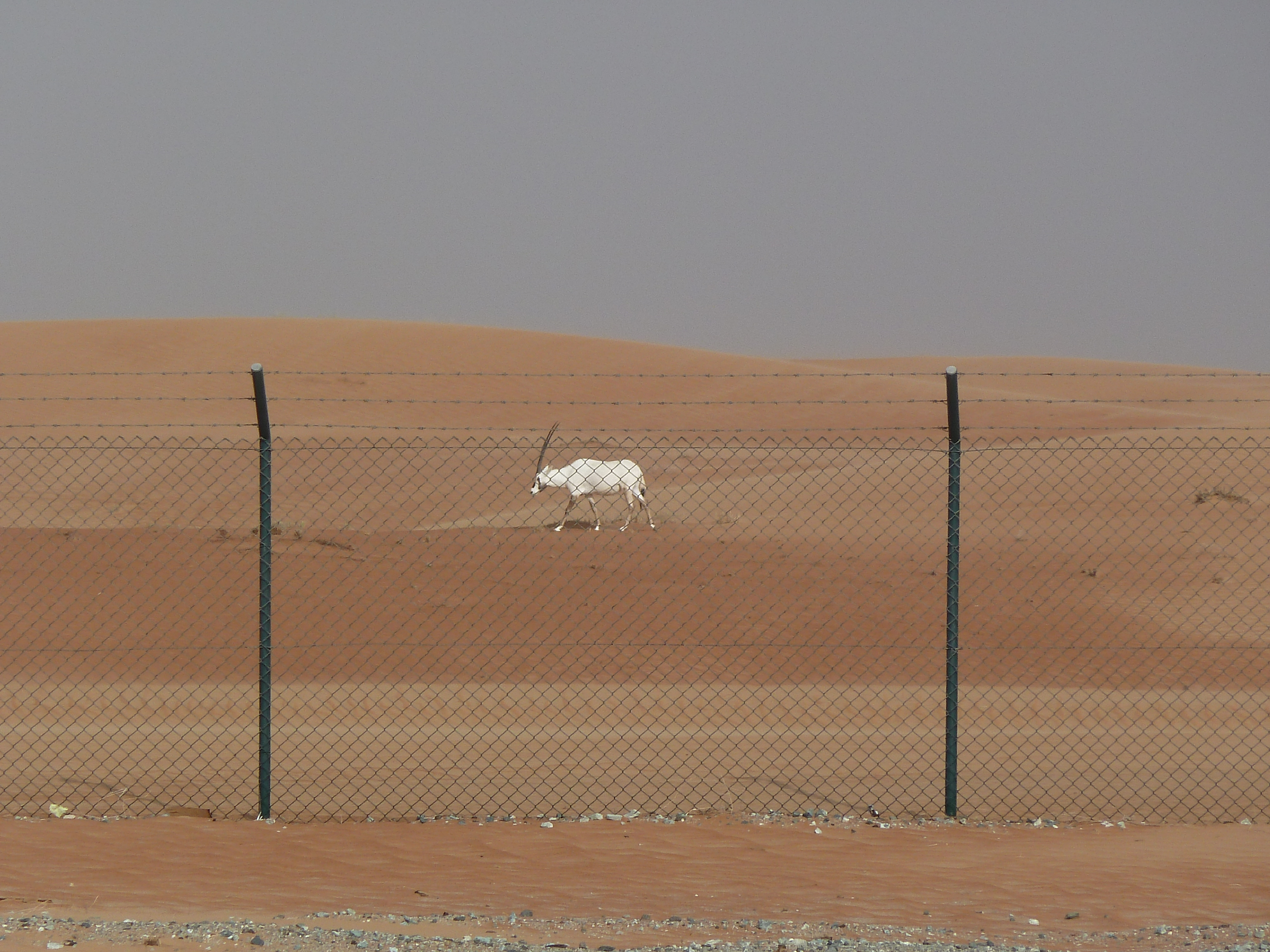
An oryx in the Wildlife Reserve in Al Wusta in 2012. The reserve was formerly the Arabian Oryx Sanctuary, a UNESCO World Heritage Site that was delisted in 2007.

World Heritage Sites may lose their designation under the World Heritage Convention when the UNESCO World Heritage Committee determines that they are not properly managed or protected. The committee can place a site it is concerned about on its list of World Heritage in Danger of losing its designation, and attempts to negotiate with the local authorities to remedy the situation. If remediation fails, the committee then revokes its designation. This procedure is governed by the Operational Guidelines to the World Heritage Convention which per se does not provide for de-listing.

A country may also request to reduce the boundaries of one of its existing sites, in effect partially or fully delisting such properties. Under the World Heritage guidelines, a country must report to the committee whenever one of its properties "inscribed on the World Heritage List has seriously deteriorated, or when the necessary corrective measures have not been taken."

Three sites have been completely delisted from the World Heritage List: the Arabian Oryx Sanctuary in Oman, the Dresden Elbe Valley in Germany and Liverpool Maritime Mercantile City in the United Kingdom.

== Delisted sites ==
=== Arabian Oryx Sanctuary ===
In 2007, Oman's Arabian Oryx Sanctuary was the first site to be removed from UNESCO's World Heritage List. The sanctuary had become a World Heritage Site in 1994. Poaching and habitat degradation had nearly wiped out the oryx population. The delisting was done in reaction to the government's decision to reduce the size of the sanctuary by 90 percent after oil had been found at the site. Only four breeding pairs of oryx were counted at the time of the removal of the designation.

=== Dresden Elbe Valley ===
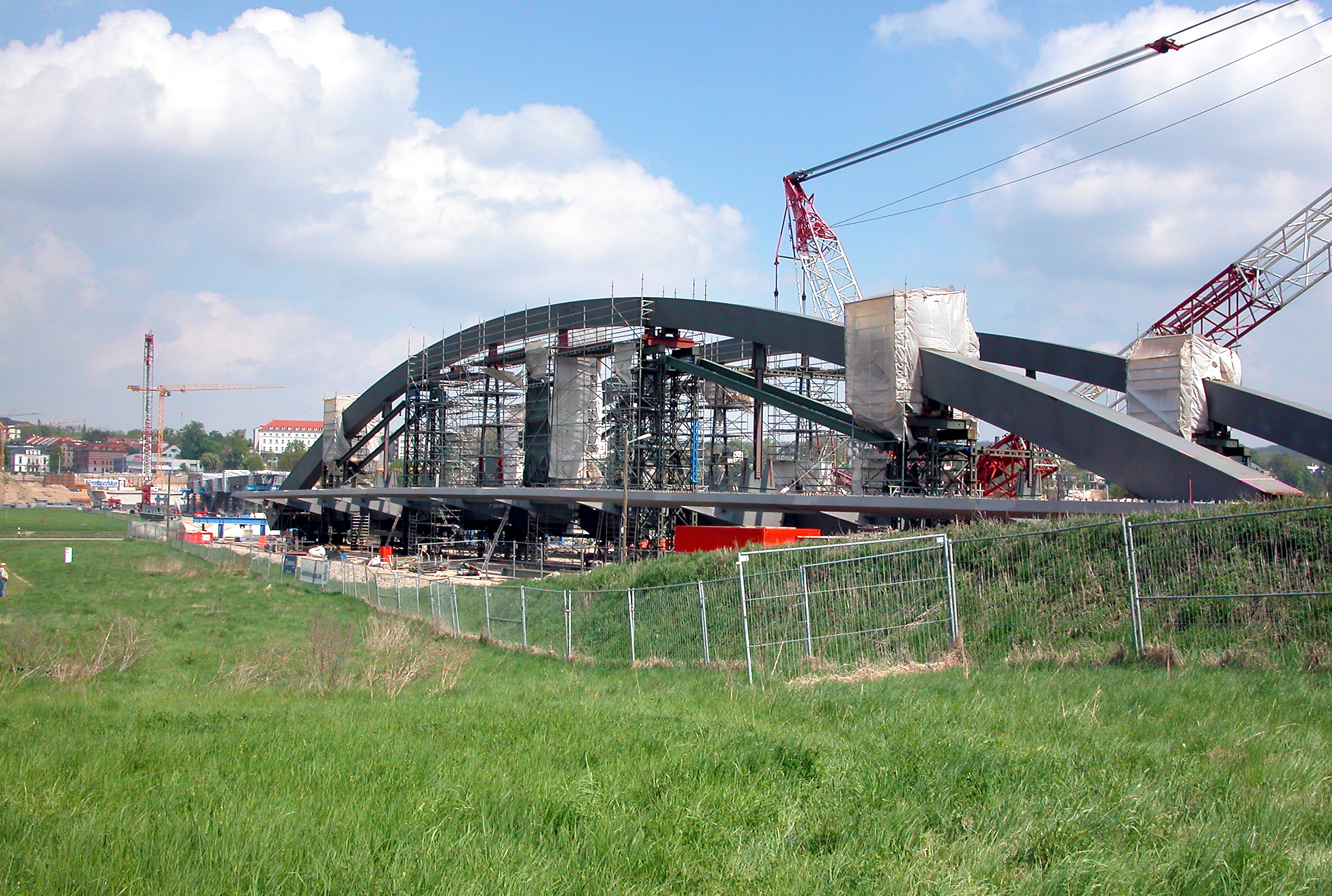
Construction for the Waldschlösschen Bridge over the Elbe River. The Dresden Elbe Valley was delisted as a UNESCO World Heritage Site, due to the bridge's construction.

On 25 June 2009, the committee of UNESCO voted to remove the status of World Heritage Site of the Dresden Elbe Valley in Germany on the basis that the Waldschlösschen Bridge that was under construction since 2007 would bisect the valley. The 20 km-long (12 mi) site had been selected as a World Heritage Site in 2004. The delisting was preceded by a long and protracted struggle between local Dresden authorities in favour of the bridge and their opponents. The bridge was proposed to remedy inner-city traffic congestion. A referendum had been conducted in 2005 about building the bridge without informing the voters that the UNESCO designation was at stake. In 2006 the site was placed on the endangered list until 2008, at which time a one-year extension was granted. When the construction of the bridge continued, a second extension was declined and at its 2009 meeting in Seville the committee voted 14 to 5 to delist the site. This was the second delisting of a World Heritage Site. While a majority of local residents polled indicated that Dresden's UNESCO title was unnecessary, the delisting removed funding to support the site and has been termed an "embarrassment". The Waldschlösschen Bridge was officially opened on 24 August 2013.

=== Liverpool Maritime Mercantile City ===
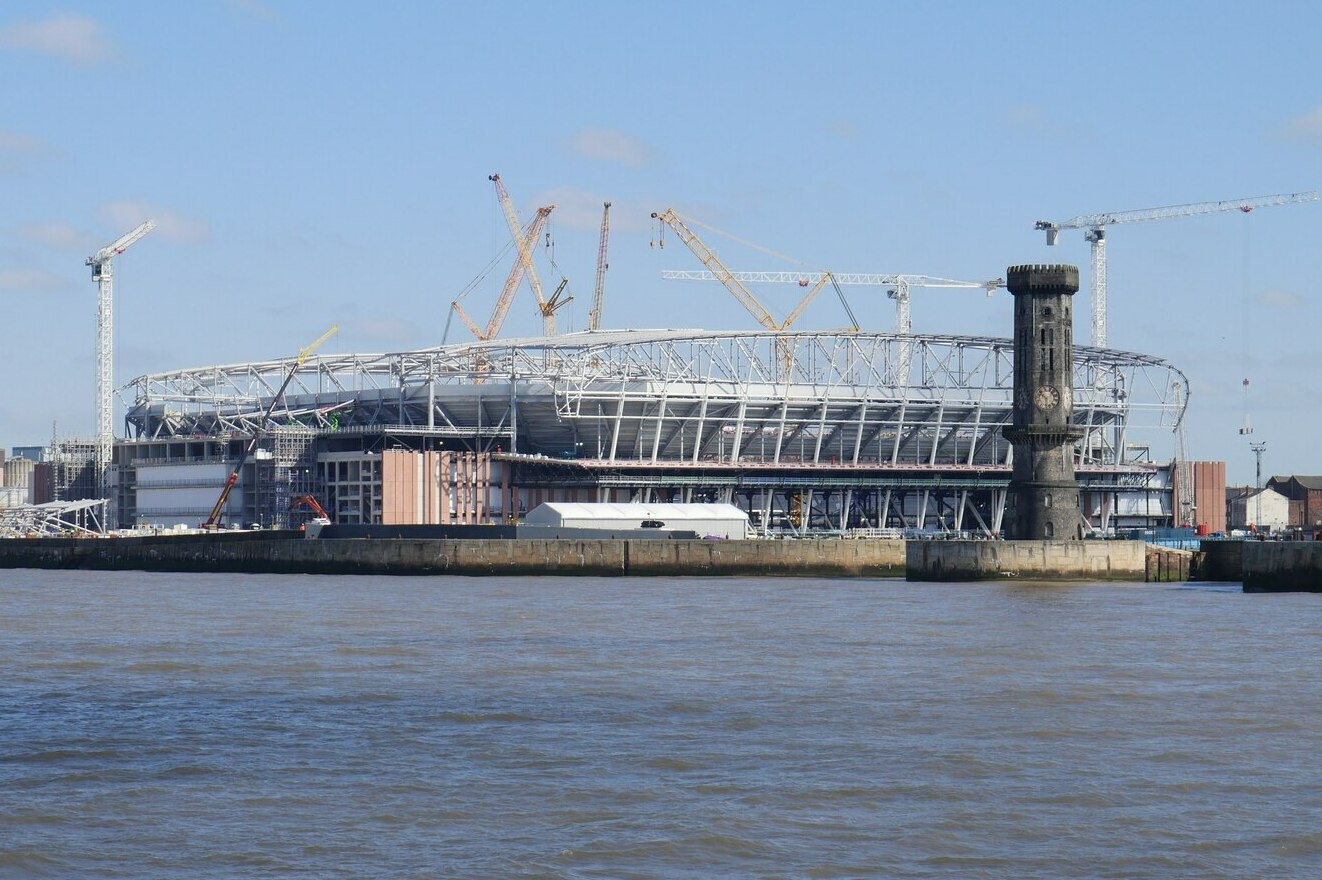
Bramley-Moore Dock Stadium, one of the projects that resulted in Liverpool Maritime Mercantile City being delisted, under construction in April 2023 with the Victoria Tower to the right

On 21 July 2021, the Liverpool Maritime Mercantile City in Liverpool in the United Kingdom became the third site to be removed from UNESCO's World Heritage List. It had become a World Heritage Site in 2004, consisting of six locations in the city centre, for being "the supreme example of a commercial port at a time of Britain's greatest global influence". In 2012, the World Heritage Committee voted to add the site to the endangered list on the basis that the proposed Liverpool Waters redevelopment project would result in a "serious loss of historic authenticity".

The committee later issued a warning in 2017 that the site risked being delisted in light of the development proposals, with English Heritage asserting that the proposed Liverpool Waters development would leave the setting of some of Liverpool's most significant historic buildings "severely compromised", the archaeological remains of parts of the historic docks "at risk of destruction", and "the city's historic urban landscape [...] permanently unbalanced".

In March 2021, Liverpool City Council's planning committee granted approval for the construction of the £500m Everton Stadium, and the World Heritage Committee voted 13 to 5, with 2 abstentions, to delist the site in July because of the "irreversible loss of attributes". However, the reaction from a small sample of Liverpudlians was mixed, some positing that the site's placing on the World Heritage List made it impossible to develop its more derelict areas and forced the city to keep aesthetically attractive but presently economically inviable buildings while others doubted tourist numbers would change as a consequence.

== Partially delisted sites ==
=== Bagrati Cathedral ===
UNESCO removed Bagrati Cathedral in Georgia from its World Heritage Sites in 2017, considering its major reconstruction detrimental to its integrity and authenticity. Both it and Gelati Monastery were inscribed as a joint World Heritage Site in 1994, then added to the endangered list in 2010. The World Heritage Committee voted in 2017 to retain Gelati Monastery on the list but exclude Bagrati Cathedral.
