= Waldschlösschen Bridge =

Bridge across the Elbe in Dresden, Germany

Waldschlösschen Bridge Waldschlößchenbrücke
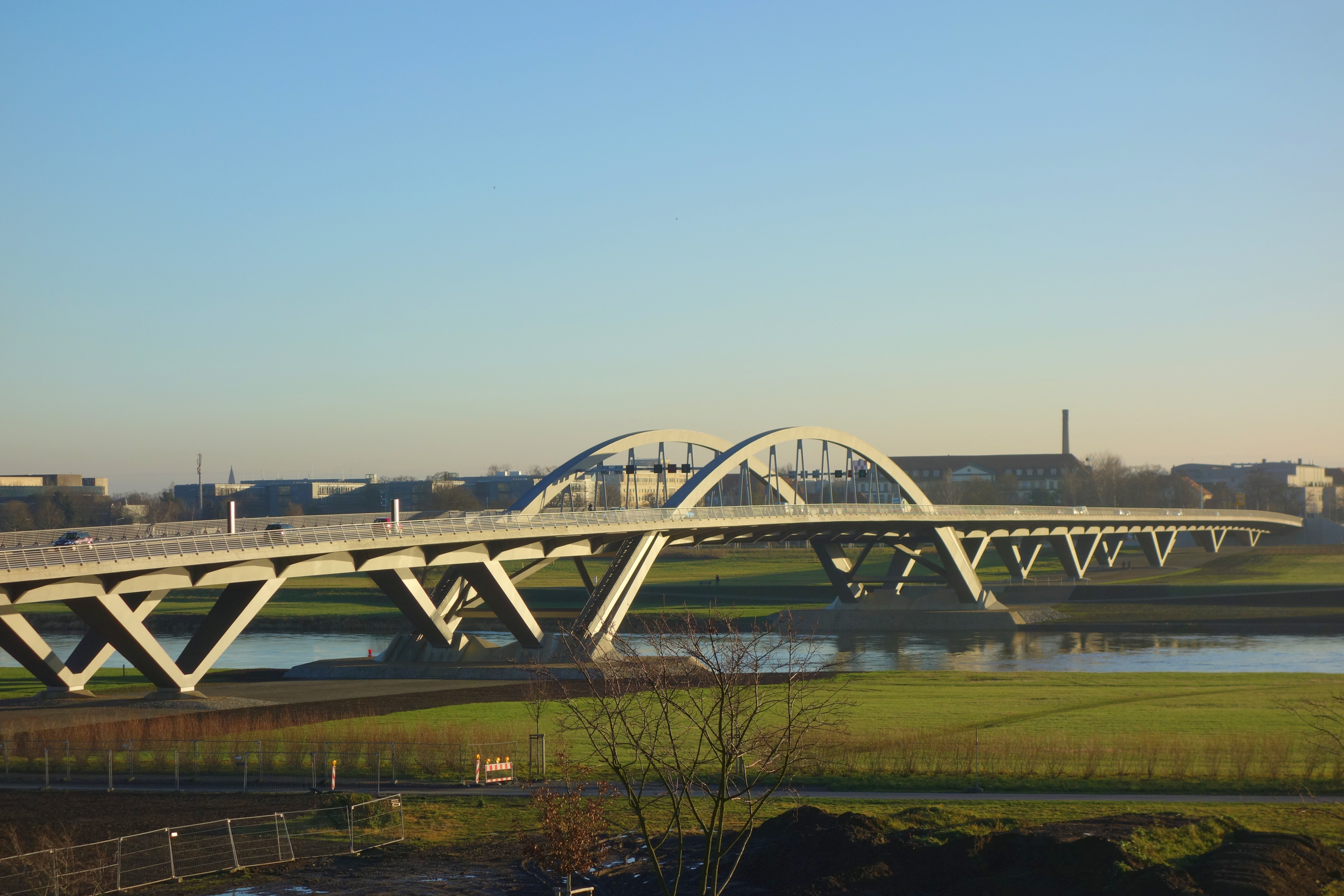
- Coordinates: 51°03′50″N 13°46′36″E
- Carries: Road traffic
- Crosses: Elbe
- Locale: Dresden
- Preceded by: Loschwitz Bridge
- Followed by: Albertbrücke

Characteristics
- Design: Steel arch
- Material: Steel and concrete
- Total length: 635 metres (2,083 ft)
- Width: 14m carriageway & 2 cantilevered paths each 4.45m
- Longest span: 148 metres (486 ft)
- Clearance below: 26 metres (85 ft)

History
- Architect: Kolb Ripke
- Engineering design by: EiSat
- Constructed by: PERI
- Construction start: 2007
- Construction end: 2012
- Construction cost: €180m
- Opened: August 24, 2013

Location
- Interactive map of Waldschlösschen Bridge

The Waldschlösschen Bridge (German: Waldschlößchenbrücke or Waldschlösschenbrücke) is a road bridge across the Elbe river in Dresden. The bridge was intended to remedy inner-city traffic congestion. Its construction was highly controversial, as the Dresden Elbe Valley had been declared a UNESCO World Heritage Site and UNESCO expressed strong concerns against the bridge, noting its intent to withdraw the World Heritage title if the bridge were built. As a result of this project, the Dresden Elbe Valley was listed in 2006 as an "Endangered World Heritage Site", and in 2009 became the second World Heritage Site to be de-listed.

== History ==
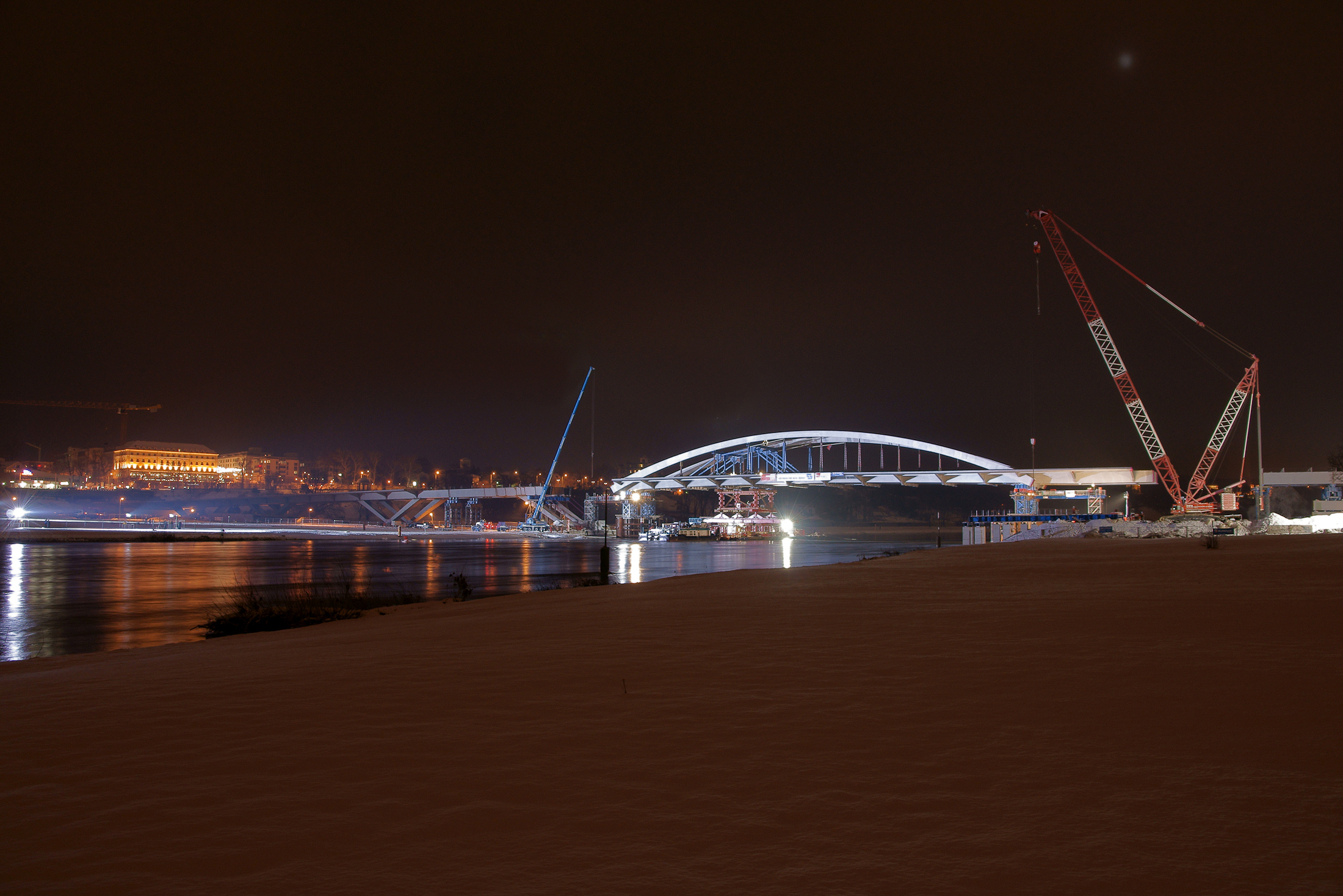
The bridge at night

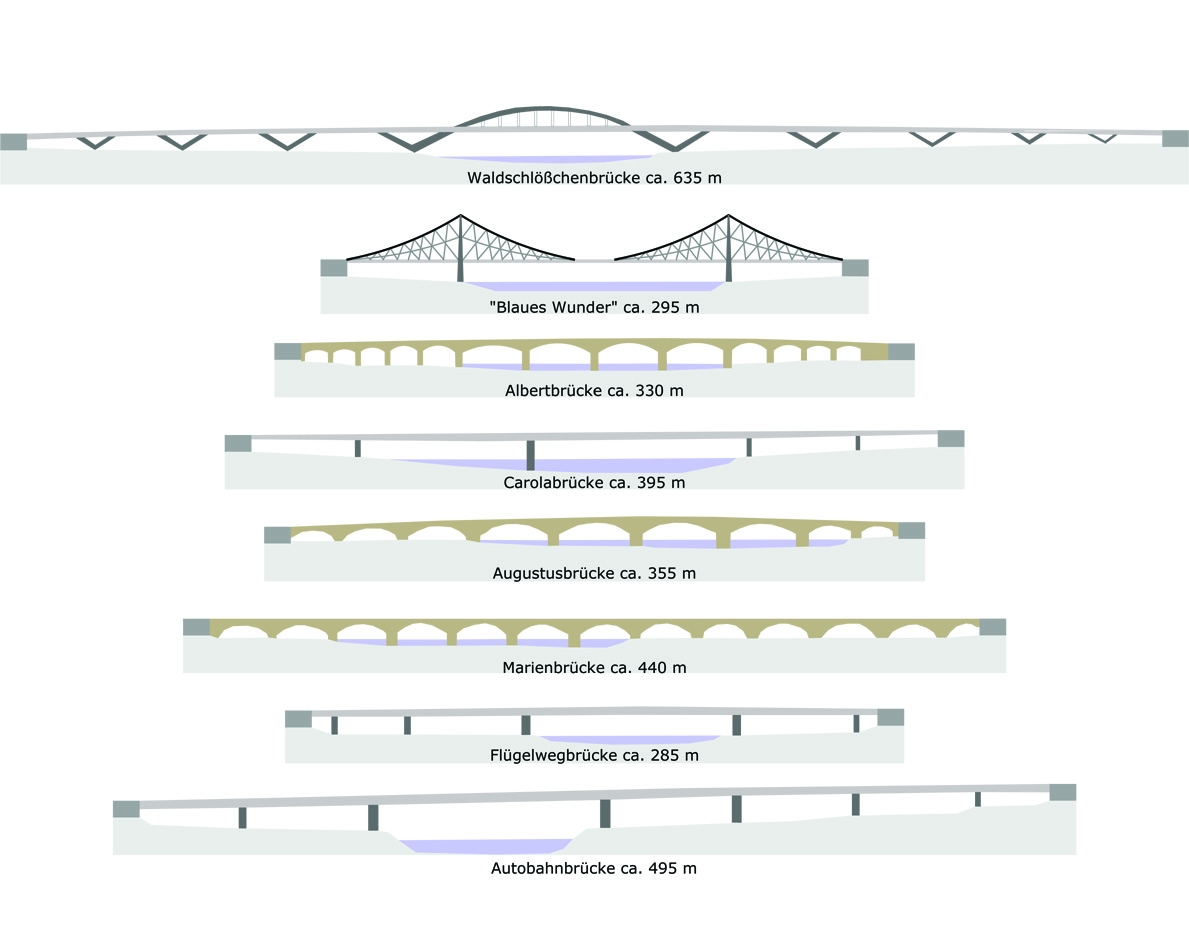
The bridge compared to other Dresden bridges

As plans to build a bridge at this location had existed for a century, in 1996, in line with a revised traffic model, the Dresden City Council agreed to the project. After almost eight years of preparation for the process of obtaining planning permission, a public referendum on whether to build the bridge was held in 2005. This resulted in a majority voting for the bridge. In April 2006, the city council stopped the plans following the UNESCO complaint. The Free State of Saxony complained, and in March 2007, at a legal hearing, the Sächsisches Oberverwaltungsgericht (the state administrative high court) ruled in favor of the planned bridge. The ruling was described by Vice President of the German Bundestag Wolfgang Thierse as "a sad day for Germany".

Construction stalled after an administrative court ruled in August 2007 that steps needed to be taken to ensure that the endangered lesser horseshoe bat was protected as it was believed that only around 650 remained in Germany, with some living near the site of the proposed bridge. German courts ruled in November 2007 that work could resume.

On 25 June 2009, the World Heritage Committee of UNESCO voted to remove the status of World Heritage Site from the Dresden Elbe Valley because of the construction of the Waldschlösschenbrücke. It was the first time a European site had ever been delisted, and only the second time anywhere in the world after the Wildlife Reserve in Al Wusta.

The bridge was designed by ESKR: Eisenloffel and Sattler (engineers) and Kolb and Ripke (architects) who won the open competition in 1997. It was built by PERI Gmbh.

The bridge was officially opened on 24 August 2013, and opened to vehicular traffic two days later.

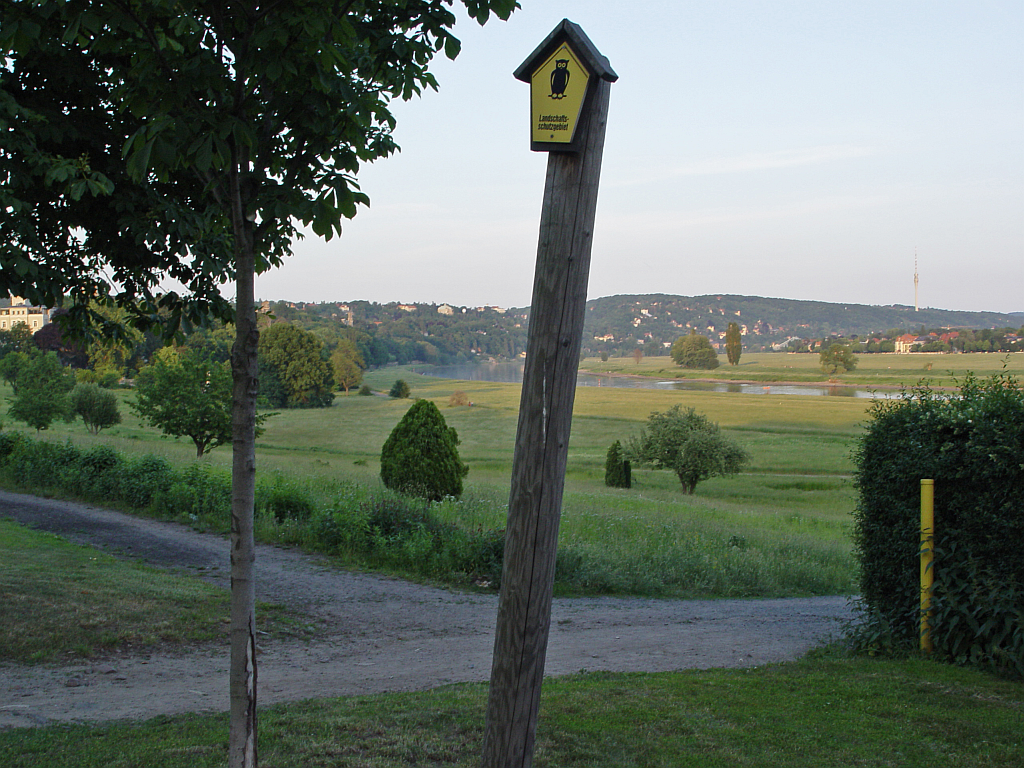
Construction location in 2003

== See also ==
- List of World Heritage in Danger
