= List of World Heritage in Danger =

Countries with World Heritage Sites in danger. Number of sites indicated by colour: Six or more sites; Five sites; Four sites; Three sites; Two sites; One site

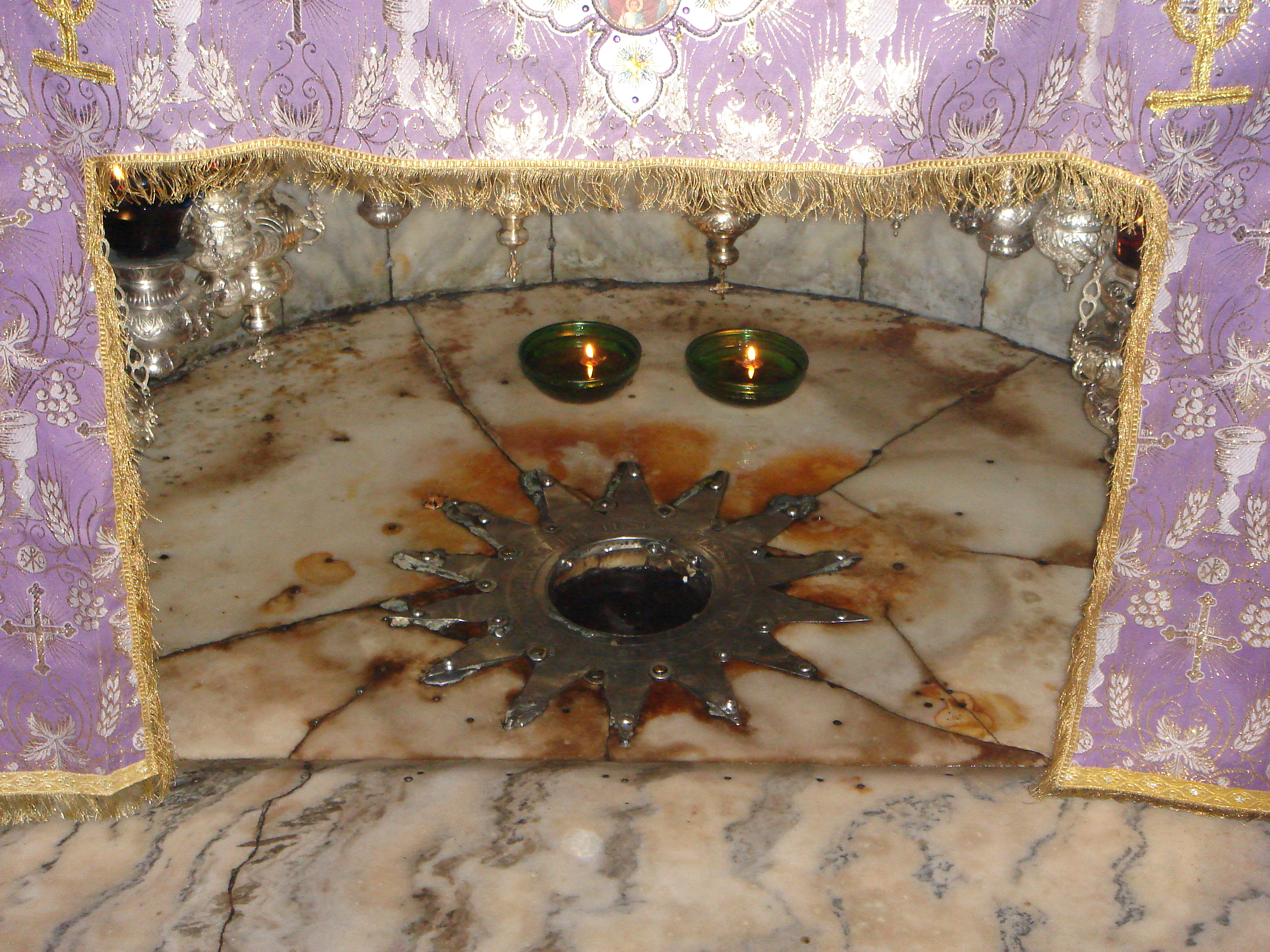
The Church of the Nativity, traditionally thought to be the birthplace of Jesus, is one of several sites to have been designated as a World Heritage Site and World Heritage in Danger in the same year. In 2019 it was removed from the danger list.

The List of World Heritage in Danger is compiled by the United Nations Educational, Scientific and Cultural Organization (UNESCO) through the World Heritage Committee, in accordance with Article 11.4 of the World Heritage Convention, (Note: Full title: Convention concerning the protection of the World Cultural and Natural Heritage) and was established in 1972 to designate and manage World Heritage Sites. The list includes sites that are under threat and whose conservation requires major interventions and for which "assistance has been requested". It is intended to raise international awareness of these threats and to encourage counteractive measures against them. Threats to a site can be either proven imminent threats or potential dangers to a site.

For natural sites, ascertained dangers include the serious decline in the population of an endangered or other valuable species, as well as the deterioration of a property's natural beauty or scientific value caused by human activities. These activities may include logging, pollution, settlement, mining, agriculture or major public works. For cultural properties, ascertained dangers include the serious deterioration of materials, structure, ornamentation, or architectural coherence, as well as the loss of historical authenticity or cultural significance. Potential dangers for both cultural and natural sites include development projects, armed conflicts, inadequate management systems or changes in the legal protective status of the properties. For cultural sites, gradual changes resulting from geological, climatic, or environmental factors may also be potential dangers.

Before a property is inscribed on the List of World Heritage in Danger, its condition is assessed and a potential programme for corrective measures is developed in cooperation with the State Party involved. The final decision about inscription is made by the committee. Financial support from the World Heritage Fund may be allocated by the committee for listed properties. The state of conservation is reviewed yearly, after which the committee may request additional measures, delete the property from the list if the threats have ceased or consider deletion from both the List of World Heritage in Danger and the World Heritage List. Of the three former UNESCO World Heritage Sites, the Dresden Elbe Valley and the Liverpool Maritime Mercantile City were delisted after placement on the List of World Heritage in Danger while the Arabian Oryx Sanctuary was directly delisted. Some sites have been designated as World Heritage Sites and World Heritage in Danger in the same year, such as the Church of the Nativity, traditionally considered to be the birthplace of Jesus.

As of May 2026, there are 53 sites (14 natural and 39 cultural) on the List of World Heritage in Danger. Arranged by UNESCO regions, 22 of the listed sites are in the Arab States, 12 in Africa, six in Latin America and the Caribbean, six in Asia and the Pacific, and seven in Europe and North America. The majority of the endangered natural sites (nine) are in Africa. The list encompasses sites identified as facing threats to their integrity, which may arise from natural disasters, armed conflict, neglect, pollution, unsustainable tourism, or other hazards. Among these sites, the impacts of armed conflict are evident in countries such as Syria, where several sites, including the Ancient City of Aleppo and the Ancient Villages of Northern Syria, endangered as a result of the Syrian civil war. In Africa, the Democratic Republic of the Congo has multiple listings due to threats such as military conflict and environmental degradation affecting its national parks.

== Criticism ==
In some cases, inclusion on the danger list has sparked conservation efforts and prompted the release of funds, benefitting sites such as the Galápagos Islands and Yellowstone National Park, both later removed from the List of World Heritage in Danger. Despite this, the list itself and UNESCO's implementation of it have been subject to criticism. In particular, States Parties and other stakeholders have questioned the authority of the World Heritage Committee to designate a site as in danger without their consent.

Until 1992, when UNESCO set a precedent by placing several sites on the danger list against the wishes of the respective States Parties, such parties would typically submit a programme of corrective measures before a site was listed. Rather than being used solely for its intended purpose, the List of World Heritage in Danger is perceived by some states as a "blacklist" and, according to Christina Cameron, Professor at the School of Architecture and Canada Research Chair on Built Heritage at the University of Montreal, has been used as a political tool to get the attention of States Parties.

The International Union for Conservation of Nature (IUCN) has noted that UNESCO has, in a number of cases, referenced the List of World Heritage in Danger without formally inscribing a site, particularly where threats could be easily addressed by the State Party. The Union has also argued that the prolonged retention of sites on the danger list is questionable and that other mechanisms for conservation should be sought in such cases.

== Current list ==
World Heritage Sites Currently Endangered
Site	Image	Location	Year listed	Years endangered	UNESCO data	Description
Air and Ténéré Natural Reserves	Sand dunes in the desert, offroad vehicles and mountains in the distance	Arlit Department	1991	1992–	Natural: (vii), (ix), (x)	Jihadist insurgency and civil disturbance in the region as well as illegal grazing and poaching.
Ancient City of Aleppo	City view with a wall and a mosque.	Aleppo Governorate	1986	2013–	Cultural: (iii), (iv)	Syrian civil war, captured by rebels in December 2024.
Ancient City of Bosra	An old amphitheatre	Daraa Governorate	1980	2013–	Cultural: (i), (iii), (vi)	Syrian civil war, captured by rebels in December 2024.
Ancient City of Damascus	Ruins of a stone building with columns and without roof	Damascus Governorate	1979	2013–	Cultural: (i), (ii), (iii), (iv), (vi)	Syrian civil war, captured by rebels in December 2024.
Boma-Badingilo Migratory Landscape		South Sudan	2026	2026–	Cultural: (vii), (ix), (x)	
Ancient City of Tauric Chersonese and its Chora		Sevastopol, AR Crimea	2013	2026–	Cultural: (ii), (v)	
Ancient Villages of Northern Syria	Ruins of a stone church without a roof	Syria	2011	2013–	Cultural: (iii), (iv), (v)	
Archaeological Site of Cyrene	Ruins of Cyrene (Shahhat), on a hillside	Jebel Akhdar	1982	2016–	Cultural: (ii), (iii), (vi)	Libyan Civil War, presence of armed groups, already incurred and potential further damage.
Archaeological Site of Leptis Magna	View upwards of the Arch of Septimius Severus at Leptis Magna, Libya	Khoms	1982	2016–	Cultural: (i), (ii), (iii)	Libyan Civil War, presence of armed groups, already incurred and potential further damage.
Archaeological Site of Sabratha	View alongside the theatre of Sabratha, Libya	Sabratha	1982	2016–	Cultural: (iii)	Libyan Civil War, presence of armed groups, already incurred and potential further damage.
Ashur (Qal'at Sherqat)	Series of three arched gates made of simple stones, apparently all that has survived from a larger building	Salah ad Din	2003	2003–	Cultural: (iii), (iv)	A planned reservoir that would have partially flooded the site was suspended in the wake of the Iraq War by the new administration; lack of adequate protection.
Chan Chan Archaeological Zone	Ruins of former buildings in a desert setting consisting of low walls with a fishnet pattern	La Libertad	1986	1986–	Cultural: (i), (iii)	Natural erosion.
City of Potosí		Potosí	1987	2014–	Cultural: (ii), (iv), (vi)	Continued mining has left the mountain porous and unstable, causing portions of the summit to collapse; the target of future mining by the Bolivian Mining Corp. Recommendations to preserve the site have not been followed through.
Coro and its Port	A street with single-storey, colourful houses	Falcón	1993	2005–	Cultural: (iv), (v)	Damage to a great number of structures due to heavy rain between November 2004 and February 2005 as well as the construction of a new monument, a beach walkway and an entrance gate to the city in the buffer zone which could have considerable impact on the value of the site.
Crac des Chevaliers and Qal'at Salah El-Din	A fortress of grey stone	Homs and Latakia Governorates	2006	2013–	Cultural: (ii), (iv)	Syrian civil war, captured by rebels in December 2024
Cultural Landscape and Archaeological Remains of the Bamiyan Valley	Large niche in a rock with the outline of a human figure	Bamyan Province	2003	2003–	Cultural: (i), (ii), (iii), (iv), (vi)	Fragile conservation state due to abandonment, military action and dynamite explosions; causing dangers such as risk of collapse of Buddha niches, further deterioration of cave murals, looting and illicit excavations.
East Rennell	Dugout canoe in the Rennell Island lagoon, Solomon Islands	Rennell and Bellona Province	1998	2013–	Natural: (ix)	Damage to the site due to logging and its effect on the local ecosystem.
Everglades National Park	A large white bird with black wingtips and a long slightly curved beak is perched on a branch above grassland.	Florida	1979	1993–2007, 2010–	Natural: viii), (ix), (x)	Damage due to Hurricane Andrew and deterioration of water flow and quality due to agricultural and urban development (1993); continued degradation of the site resulting in a loss of marine habitat and decline in marine species (2010)
Fortifications on the Caribbean Side of Panama: Portobelo-San Lorenzo	Ruins of stone fortifications near water	Colón Province	1980	2012–	Cultural: (i), (iv)	Environmental factors, lack of maintenance and urban development.
Garamba National Park	Bird's-eye view of a river running through grassland interspersed by trees	Orientale	1980	1984–1992, 1996–	Natural: (vii), (x)	Reduction of northern white rhinoceros population (1984); poaching of two white rhinos, killing of three rangers and no plan for corrective measures by the authorities (1996)
Hatra	Ruins of a pantheon built with tan stones, with vegetation in the foreground	Ninawa Governorate	1985	2015–	Cultural: (ii), (iii), (iv), (vi)	Damage inflicted to the property by the Islamic State.
Historic Inner City of Paramaribo		Paramaribo District	2002	2026–	Cultural: (ii), (iv)	
Hebron/Al-Khalil Old Town		Hebron Governorate	2017	2017–	1565; ii, iv, vi (cultural)	
Historic Centre of Odesa	A round opera house built in the baroque style	Odesa	2023	2023–	Cultural: (ii), (iv)	Russo-Ukrainian War
Kyiv: Saint-Sophia Cathedral and Related Monastic Buildings, Kyiv Pechersk Lavra	Church with green and golden domes	Kyiv	1990	2023–	Cultural: (i), (ii), (iii), (iv)	Russo-Ukrainian War
L'viv – the Ensemble of the Historic Centre	Colourful old townhouses and a fountain with a statue in front	Lviv	1998	2023–	Cultural: (ii), (v)	Russo-Ukrainian War
Historic Centre of Shakhrisyabz		Qashqadaryo Region	2000	2016–	Cultural: (iii), (iv)	Destruction of buildings in its medieval neighbourhoods and continuing urban development.
Historic Town of Zabīd	White minaret and mosque	Al Hudaydah	1993	2000–	Cultural: (ii), (iv), (vi)	Deteriorating state of historic buildings, inscribed on request of the State Party.
Islands and Protected Areas of the Gulf of California	Gulf of California	Baja California, Baja California Sur, Sonora, Sinaloa, and Nayarit	2005	2019–	Natural: (vii), (ix), (x)	Imminent extinction of the vaquita, an endemic porpoise in the gulf.
Kahuzi-Biega National Park	A gorilla in a shrub	South Kivu and Maniema	1980	1997–	Natural: (x)	Deforestation, hunting as well as war and civil strife.
Lake Turkana National Parks	A lake with land in the foreground and background.	Kenya	1997	2018–	Natural: (viii), (x)	Impact of Ethiopia's Gilgel Gibe III Dam on the lake's flow and ecosystem.
Landmarks of Ancient Kingdom of Saba	Ruins of a dam built in old Arabian architecture, with rocky mountains in the background	Marib	2023	2023–	Cultural: (iii), (iv)	Threats of destruction caused by the Yemeni Civil War.
Manovo-Gounda St Floris National Park	Manovo	Bamingui-Bangoran	1988	1997–	Natural: (ix), (x)	Illegal grazing and poaching, deteriorating security situation.
Minaret and Archaeological Remains of Jam	A tall minaret in a river valley. High on mountains in the background there are other, smaller structures.	Ghōr	2002	2002–	Cultural: (ii), (iii), (iv)	Lack of legal protection, lack of protection measure or management plan, and poor condition of the site.
Medieval Monuments in Kosovo	Stone church with various towers	Kosovo	2004	2006–	Cultural: (ii), (iii), (iv)	March Pogrom, lack of legal protection and management; political instability and insecurity.
Mount Amel Castles	A ruined stone castle on a hilltop	South Governorate	2026	2026–	Cultural: (ii), (iv)	
Mount Nimba Strict Nature Reserve	A chimpanzee in a tree.	Lola Prefecture	1981	1992–	Natural: (ix), (x)	Iron ore mining concession on part of the World Heritage Site and influx of large number of refugees on the Guinean part of the site.
Nan Madol: Ceremonial Centre of Eastern Micronesia		Temwen Island	2016	2016–	Cultural: (i), (iii), (iv), (vi)	Continuing siltation of waterways contributing to overgrowth and undermining existing structures.
Okapi Wildlife Reserve	River lined with tropical vegetation, many stones in its bed	Orientale	1996	1997–	Natural: (x)	Looting of park facilities and killing of elephants as a result of an armed conflict in the area.
Old City of Jerusalem and its Walls	View over a city; in the background, a large building with a golden cupola	Jerusalem	1981	1982–	Cultural: (ii), (iii), (vi)	Uncontrolled urban development, general deterioration of the state of conservation due to tourism and lack of maintenance.
Old City of Sana'a	View of Old Sana'a	Sana'a Governorate	1986	2015–	Cultural: (iv), (v), (vi)	Yemeni Civil War
Old Towns of Djenné		Djenné	1988	2016–	Cultural: (iii), (iv)	Regional insecurity, deteriorating state of the historic town, urbanization and erosion.
Palestine: Land of Olives and Vines – Cultural Landscape of Southern Jerusalem, Battir		Battir	2014	2014–	Cultural: (iv)(v)	The Israeli West Bank barrier "may isolate farmers from fields they have cultivated for centuries".
Old Walled City of Shibam	High-rise architecture at Shibam	Hadhramaut Governorate	1982	2015–	Cultural: (iii), (iv), (v)	Potential threat from the armed conflict, compounding safeguarding and management problems already observed at the site.
Rachid Karami International Fair	A pavilion built in a 1960s modern architecture style surrounded by Middle Eastern vegetation and a partially drained pool. The interior is decayed from a lack of maintenance.	Tripoli	2023	2023–	Cultural: (ii)(iv)	Threatened by lack of funds for maintenance due to the Lebanese liquidity crisis, urban development, and "its alarming state of conservation".
Río Plátano Biosphere Reserve	A river lined with tropical vegetation, tree trunks and branches in the water	La Mosquitia	1982	1996–2007, 2011–	Natural: (vii), (viii), (ix), (x)	Logging, fishing and land occupation; poaching and the reduced capacity of the state to manage the site; largely due to the deterioration of law and to the presence of drug traffickers.
Rock-Art Sites of Tadrart Acacus		Fezzan	1985	2016–	Cultural: (iii)	Libyan Civil War, presence of armed groups, already incurred and potential further damage.
Saint Hilarion Monastery/Tell Umm Amer		Deir al-Balah Governorate	2024	2024–	Cultural: (ii)(iii)(iv)	Gaza war.
Samarra Archaeological City	Spiral minaret in an open plain with a large number of buildings in the background and a swerving road to the left	Salah ad Din	2007	2007–	Cultural: (ii)(iii)(iv)	Security situation following the Iraq War and lack of state control for protection or management of the site.
Sebastia		Nablus Governorate	2026	2026–	Cultural: (ii), (v)	Gaza war.
Selous Game Reserve		Coast, Morogoro, Lindi, Mtwara and Ruvuma Regions	1982	2014–	Natural: (ix), (x)	Exploration and extraction of minerals, large infrastructure projects
Site of Palmyra	Ruins of stone buildings with columns	Homs Governorate	1980	2013–	Cultural: (i), (ii), (iv)	Syrian civil war, captured by rebels in December 2024
Timbuktu	A street with a mud wall and a pyramid shaped mud building with sticks protruding from its wall.	Timbuktu, Timbuktu Region	1988	2012–	Cultural: (ii), (iv), (v)	Threat of destruction by Islamist groups like Al-Qaeda in Islamic Maghreb, Ansar Dine and Boko Haram. Some monuments are now pillaged and destroyed.
Tomb of Askia	A mud structure with sticks protruding from the wall	Gao, Gao Region	2004	2012–	Cultural: (ii), (iii), (iv)	Damaged by Islamist groups like Al-Qaeda in Islamic Maghreb and Ansar Dine. Reported destroyed by Ansar Dine when they captured Timbuktu.
Tropical Rainforest Heritage of Sumatra		Sumatra	2004	2011	Natural: (vii), (ix), (x)	Poaching, illegal logging, agricultural encroachment, and plans to build roads through the site.
Tyre		South Lebanon Governorate	1984	2026–	Cultural: (iii), (vi)	
Virunga National Park	Mountain landscape with trunks of trees or shrubs that appear to have burned	North Kivu and Orientale	1979	1994–	Natural: (vii), (viii), (x)	Deforestation and poaching as a result of the influx of refugees due to the Rwandan Civil War.
Roșia Montană Mining Landscape	The gold mine of Roșia Montană	Alba County, Romania	2021	2021–	Cultural: (ii), (iii), (iv)	Threats posed by plans to resume mining which would damage a major part of the inscribed Mining Landscape.

== Previously listed sites ==
A number of sites were previously listed as being in danger, but later removed from the list after improvements in management and conservation. The Everglades National Park was listed from 1993 to 2007 and has been again since 2010; the Río Plátano Biosphere Reserve was listed from 1996 to 2007 and has been again since 2011: both are therefore included in the list of currently listed sites (above).

Delisted altogether as a World Heritage Site
Partial de-listing from the World Heritage List

World Heritage Sites Previously Endangered
Site	Image	Location	Year listed	Years endangered	UNESCO data	Description
Abu Mena		Abusir	1979	2001–2025	Cultural: iv	Cave-ins in the area caused by the clay at the surface, which becomes semi-liquid when met with "excess water"
Angkor	Ruins of a large structure with five large towers at the top	Siem Reap Province	1992	1992–2004	Cultural: (i), (ii), (iii), (iv)	Inscription initially limited to a three-year period (1993–1995) during which effective legal protection, boundary and buffer zones were to be established and international conservation efforts were to be monitored and coordinated; at the time of inscription, Cambodia was UN-controlled following the war with Vietnam in the 1980s.
Bagrati Cathedral and Gelati Monastery	Ruins of a stone church with the highest point at the apsis	Imereti	1994	2010–2017	Cultural: (iv)	Major reconstruction project that will lead to irreversible interventions. The boundaries of the site was modified in 2017. (Note: From the List of World Heritage in Danger) Bagrati Cathedral was removed from the list of World Heritage Sites after its reconstruction. However, Gelati Monastery remained on the list.
Bahla Fort	Walls of a stone fort and a tower	Bahla	1987	1988–2004	Cultural: (iv)	Degradation of earth structures of the fort and of the oasis of Bahla
Bam and its Cultural Landscape	View over a large ruined city coloured grey-brown; in the background, a castle overlooks the city	Kerman	2004	2004–2013	Cultural: (ii), (iii), (iv), (v)	Following the damage due to the 2003 Bam earthquake
Belize Barrier Reef Reserve System	Underwater image of a green stone like object with patterns on the surface resembling a brain	Belize, Stann Creek and Toledo Districts	1996	2009–2018	Natural: (vii), (ix), (x)	Mangrove cutting and excessive development
Birthplace of Jesus: Church of the Nativity and the Pilgrimage Route, Bethlehem	Birthplace of Jesus	Bethlehem	2012	2012–2019	Cultural: (iv), (vi)	Damage due to water leaks.
Butrint	Ruins of an amphitheatre and other structures	Sarandë District	1992	1997–2005	iii (cultural)	Damages due to management and conservation
Cologne Cathedral	A large gothic cathedral of grey to black stone	North Rhine-Westphalia	1996	2004–2006	Cultural: (i), (ii), (iv)	High-rise building plan near the cathedral threatening to inflict damage to the integrity of the property; delisted after the building plan was halted and a buffer zone introduced
Comoé National Park	A white vehicle with luggage on top fording a river with green trees in the background, all under a clear blue sky	Zanzan	1983	2003–2017	Natural: (ix), (x)	Civil unrest, poaching and lack of effective management mechanisms
Djoudj National Bird Sanctuary	Cormorants on a tree without leaves above some water	Biffeche	1981	1984–1988, 2000–2006	Natural: (vii), (x)	Long term threat by construction plan for a down-stream dam (1984); delisted (1988) as water supply to the park was insured by the construction of a sluice and a management plan was being prepared; relisted (Note: On the List of World Heritage in Danger) (2000) due to environmental and economical threats posed by the introduced species Salvinia molesta and Pistia stratiotes as well as issues with water management in the park.
Dresden Elbe Valley	Dresden skyline in the Elbe Valley	Saxony	2004	2006–2009	Cultural: (ii), (iii), (iv), (v)	Construction plans for the Waldschlösschen Bridge in the core area of the cultural landscape; removed from the list of World Heritage Sites in 2009 after construction commenced at the end of 2007.
Dubrovnik	Marina in a city with churches and a fort	Dubrovnik-Neretva County	1979	1991–1998	Cultural: (i), (iii), (iv)	Croatian War of Independence
Fort and Shalamar Gardens in Lahore	Entrance gate to a fort flanked by two large towers	Punjab	1981	2000–2012	Cultural: (i), (ii), (iii)	Destruction of historic water tanks in 1999 to widen a road and deteriorating perimeter walls of the Garden, listed on request of the Pakistan government.
Galápagos Islands	Landscape with little vegetation, rocks and an isthmus.	Galápagos Province	1978	2007–2010	Natural: vii), (viii), (ix), (x)	Various threats including insufficient prevention of possibilities for the introduction of alien species, insufficient resource allocation for conservation agencies and park management, presence of a large number of illegal immigrants, rapid uncontrolled growth of tourism, fishing over-capacity and sports fishing.
Group of Monuments at Hampi	Very high gate-like structure decorated with many niches	Bellary district	1986	1999–2006	Cultural: (i), (iii), (iv)	Partial construction of two cable-suspended bridges within the protected archaeological areas of Hampi threatening the integrity and authenticity of the site
Historic Centre of Vienna		Vienna	2001	2017–2026	Cultural: (ii), (iv), (vi)	New high-rise projects.
Historical Monuments of Mtskheta	A compact tall stone church with a circular tower above the apsis	Mtskheta-Mtianeti	1994	2009–2016	Cultural: (iii), (iv)	Deterioration of stonework and frescoes, mismanagement and urban development
Humberstone and Santa Laura Saltpeter Works	Industrial structure in a desert setting.	Tarapacá	2005	2005–2019	Cultural: (ii), (iii), (iv)	Fragile nature of structures due to lack of maintenance for 40 years; also damage, vandalism and some dismantling; looting
Ichkeul National Park	Forested coastal mountains	Bizerta	1980	1996–2006	Natural: (x)	Construction of dams limiting the freshwater flow to the area and causing an increased salinity of the lake and the marshes as well as a decrease in the number of migrating bird populations
Iguaçu National Park	A large waterfall falling into a horseshoe-shaped gorge	Paraná State	1986	1999–2001	Natural: (vii), (x)	Illegally opened road – "Estrada do Colono" (Portuguese for "Settler's Road") – through the park, dams on the Iguazu River and helicopter flights.
Kathmandu Valley	Red multi-storied building and towerlike structure	Kathmandu Valley	1979	2003–2007	Cultural: (iii), (iv), (vi)	Partial or substantial loss of the traditional elements of six out of seven monument zones and resulting general loss of authenticity and integrity of the whole property.
Liverpool – Maritime Mercantile City	A montage of several pictures showing a western city near water	England	2004	2012–2021	Cultural: (ii), (iii), (iv)	Due to the proposed redevelopment of historic docklands known as Liverpool Waters, (including Bramley-Moore Dock stadium of Everton F.C.). Stripped of World Heritage status in July 2021, due to the continued progress of the developments.
Los Katíos National Park	The giant anteater, one of the inhabitants of Los Katíos	Antioquia and Chocó Departments	1994	2009–2015	Natural: (ix), (x)	Deforestation, illegal fishing and hunting. Removed following significant improvements to park management
Manas Wildlife Sanctuary	A one-horned Indian rhinoceros in a grassland landscape	Assam	1985	1992–2011	Natural: (vii), (ix), (x)	Poaching, damage to the park's infrastructure and decrease in the population of some species particularly the Indian rhinoceros (pictured) following an invasion by militants of the Bodo tribe in 1992
Natural and Culturo-Historical Region of Kotor	A town in rocky mountains next to a bay or lake	Bay of Kotor, Kotor and surrounding territory	1979	1979–2003	Cultural: (i), (ii), (iii), (iv)	Damage following the earthquake from 15 April 1979
Ngorongoro Conservation Area	Bird's-eye view of a largely unvegetated plain with a lake, a mountain range in the distance	Arusha Region	1978	1984–1989	Natural: (iv), (vii), (viii), (ix), (x)	Declining conservation status
Niokolo-Koba National Park	Bird's-eye view of a river running through a forested plain	Tambacounda Region and Kédougou Region	1981	2007–2024	Natural: (x)	Degradation of property, low mammal population, management problems and impact of a proposed dam on the Gambia River
Old Town of Ghadamès		Ghadames	1986	2016–2025	Cultural: (v)	Libyan Civil War, presence of armed groups, already incurred and potential further damage.
Plitvice Lakes National Park	Turqoise lakes among white rocks	Lika-Senj County	1979	1992–1997	Natural: (vii), (viii), (ix)	Potential threat due to the Croatian War of Independence
Rainforests of the Atsinanana	A river in a forested mountain area	Eastern Madagascar	2007	2010–2025	Natural: (ix), (x)	Illegal logging and hunting of endangered lemurs
Rice Terraces of the Philippine Cordilleras	A village in the Batad rice terraces	Ifugao	1995	2001–2012	Cultural: (iii), (iv), (v)	Absence of systematic monitoring programme or a comprehensive management plan
Royal Palaces of Abomey	Stone wall and a simple hut with coloured relief decorations of animals and plants	Zou Department	1985	1985–2007	Cultural: (iii), (iv)	General state of deterioration due to the elements and inappropriate restoration in conflict with the authenticity of the site
Ruins of Kilwa Kisiwani and Ruins of Songo Mnara	Vault of a ramshackle, possibly ruined building	Kilwa District	1981	2004–2014	Cultural: (iii)	Continuing deterioration of the site due to various factors such as erosion or plants
Rwenzori Mountains National Park	Hills with grassland, trees and farmland in front of a mountain range	Bundibugyo, Kabarole and Kasese Districts	1994	1999–2004	Natural: (vii), (ix)	Security situation and lack of monitoring of a major part of the park
Salonga National Park	River meandering through a wooded plain	Équateur and Bandundu provinces	1984	1999–2021	Natural: (vii), (ix)	Poaching and housing construction. Removed from the list in danger due to improvements in its state of conservation.
Sangay National Park	Forested mountain landscape	Chimborazo, Morona-Santiago and Tungurahua Provinces	1983	1992–2005	Natural: (vii), (viii), (ix), (x)	Heavy poaching, illegal livestock grazing, encroachment and potential threat through a road construction project
Simien National Park	Mountain landscape with deep precipices	Amhara Region	1978	1996–2017	Natural: (vii), (x)	Deterioration of population of Walia ibex
Srebarna Nature Reserve	Lake in a landscape with low vegetation	Silistra Province	1983	1992–2003	Natural: (x)	Prevention of seasonal flooding and agricultural use causing a decline or disappearance of the water and passerine bird populations
Timbuktu	Pyramidal structure with many sticks protruding from its walls	Circle and Tombouctou regions	1988	1990–2005	Cultural: (ii), (iv), (v)	Threat of sand encroachment
Tipasa	Several arches of a ruined building	Tipaza Province	1982	2002–2006	Cultural: (iii), (iv)	Inadequate maintenance affecting the integrity of the site and its buffer zone
Tombs of Buganda Kings at Kasubi	Dome shaped house made of natural materials	Kampala District	2001	2010–2023	Cultural: (i), (iii), (iv), (vi)	Destruction of the Muzibu Azaala Mpanga, the main building of the site, by fire in March 2010. Removed from the list of World Heritage in Danger in 2023 after the structure was rebuilt.
Walled City of Baku with Shirvanshah's Palace and Maiden Tower		Baku	2000	2003–2009	Cultural: (iv)	Damage sustained during the 2000 Baku earthquake, urban development and inadequate conservation efforts
Wieliczka Salt Mine	Large room with lamps hanging from the ceiling and sculptures or reliefs along the walls	Lesser Poland Voivodeship	1978	1989–1998	Cultural: (iv)	Humidity problem
Yellowstone National Park	Large waterfall in a rocky mountain landscape	Wyoming, Montana, and Idaho	1978	1995–2003	Natural: (vii), (viii), (ix), (x)	Ascertained dangers to Yellowstone cutthroat trout as well as sewage leakage and waste contamination in parts of the park; potential threats to water quantity and quality, past and proposed mining activities, a proposed control programme to eradicate brucellosis in the bison herds

== See also ==
- Former UNESCO World Heritage Sites
- World Heritage Sites by country
- List of World Heritage Sites by year of inscription
- Lists of World Heritage Sites
- Cultural heritage sites at risk from climate change
