= Dresden Elbe Valley =

Cultural landscape and former World Heritage Site in Germany

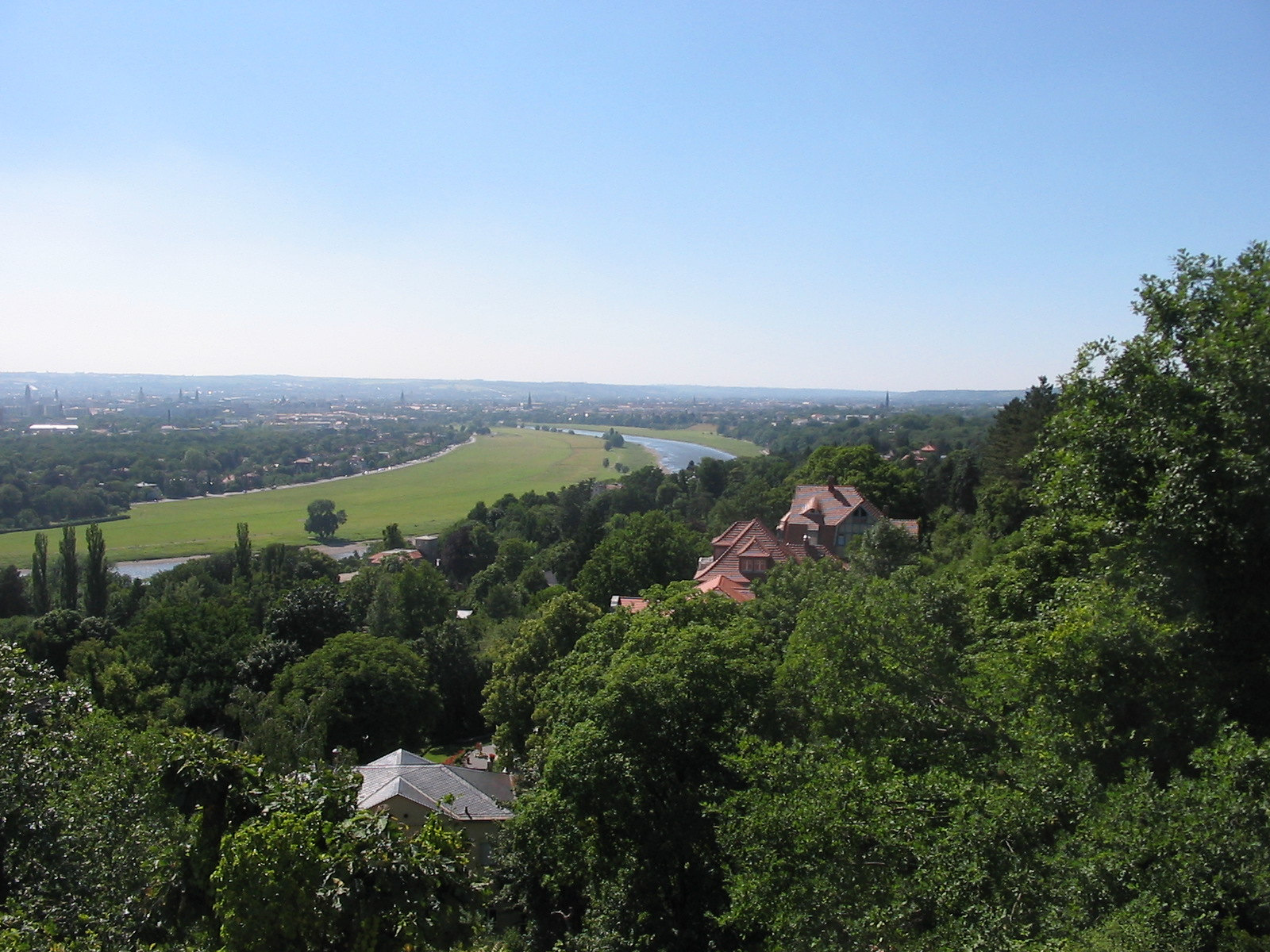
- View from Loschwitz to Dresden city centre (2005), prior to the construction of the Waldschlösschen Bridge.

- Location within Germany Location within Saxony
- Length: 20 kilometres (12 mi) Northwest-Southeast

Geography
- Location: Dresden Basin, Germany
- Population centers: Dresden
- Coordinates: 51°02′59″N 13°48′48″E
- Rivers: Elbe
- Interactive map of Dresden Elbe Valley

Former UNESCO World Heritage Site
- Type: Cultural
- Criteria: ii, iii, iv, v
- Designated: 2004 (28th session)
- Reference no.: 1156
- Region: Europe
- Delisted: 2009 (33rd session)

The Dresden Elbe Valley is a cultural landscape and former World Heritage Site stretching along the Elbe river in Dresden, the state capital of Saxony, Germany. The valley, extending for some 20 kilometres (12 mi) and passing through the Dresden Basin, is one of two major cultural landscapes built up over the centuries along the Central European river Elbe, along with the Dessau-Wörlitz Garden Realm downstream.

With respect to its scenic and architectural values, including the Dresden urban area as well as natural river banks and slopes, the Elbe Valley was entered on the World Heritage Site list of UNESCO in 2004. However, in July 2006 it was designated a World Heritage in Danger and finally delisted in June 2009, in the course of the construction of the Waldschlösschen Bridge river crossing.

== Description ==
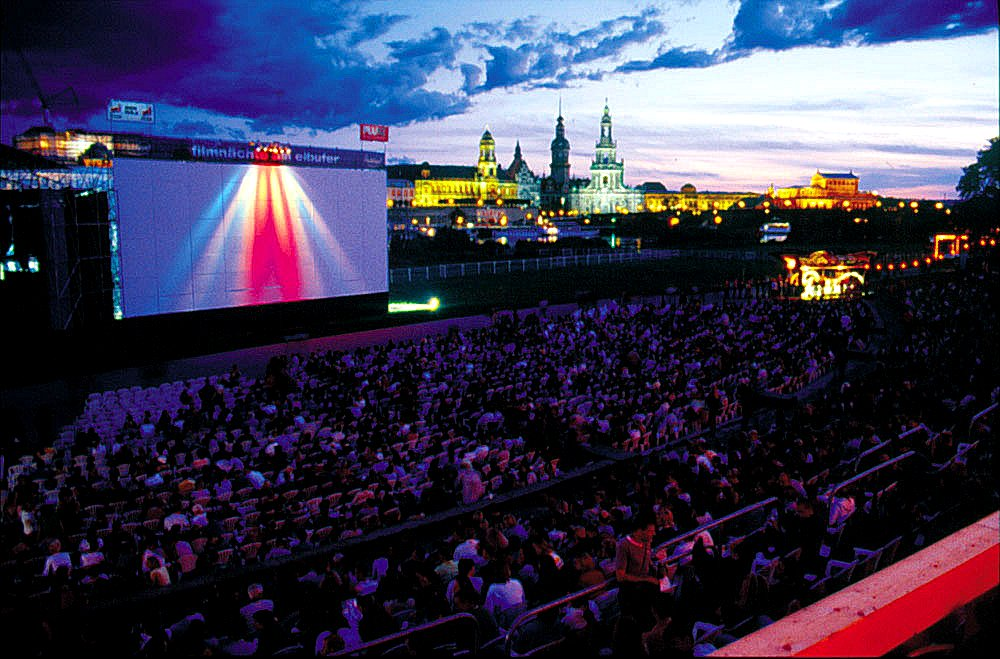
Filmnächte outdoor cinema in the Elbe Valley with Dresden skyline

The cultural landscape comprises the Dresden urban area along the Elbe meanders, stretching from the Loschwitz district in the southeast down to the Ostragehege plains in the northwest. The forested Elbe slopes of the Lusatian Plateau and the Dresden Heath in the northeast protect the Valley from harsh winds; with an average annual temperature between 9.3 and 10 °C, even viticulture (Saxon wine) is common. The Elbe banks are characterised by extended meadows (Elbwiesen) which have remained free of any building developments due to regularly occurring floods. The landscape is a conservation area according to the 1992 EU Habitats Directive, including numerous smaller protected areas (Naturschutzgebiete).

Settlements and architecture in the Elbe Valley reflect the development of Dresden as Saxon residence since the Renaissance era. Points of interest include Albrechtsberg Palace on the northern slopes, Pillnitz with its castle and old village, works of engineering such as the 'Blue Wonder' bridge at the Loschwitz Schillerplatz, the nearby Dresden Funicular and Suspension Railway or the Yenidze tobacco factory. Grouped around Brühl's Terrace, the 'Balcony of Europe' built in the historic city centre high above the Elbe river, are the Frauenkirche, Semperoper, Zwinger, Dresden Castle, and Dresden Cathedral, the Catholic court church of the Saxon electors and kings. Vis-à-vis on the right bank is the Innere Neustadt district with the government quarter around the State Chancellery building and the Japanese Palace. Recently erected buildings such as the New Synagogue or the Saxon Landtag complete the picture. Parts of the area such as Blasewitz are historic suburbs of the city, while there are also industrial districts.

== Revoked World Heritage status ==
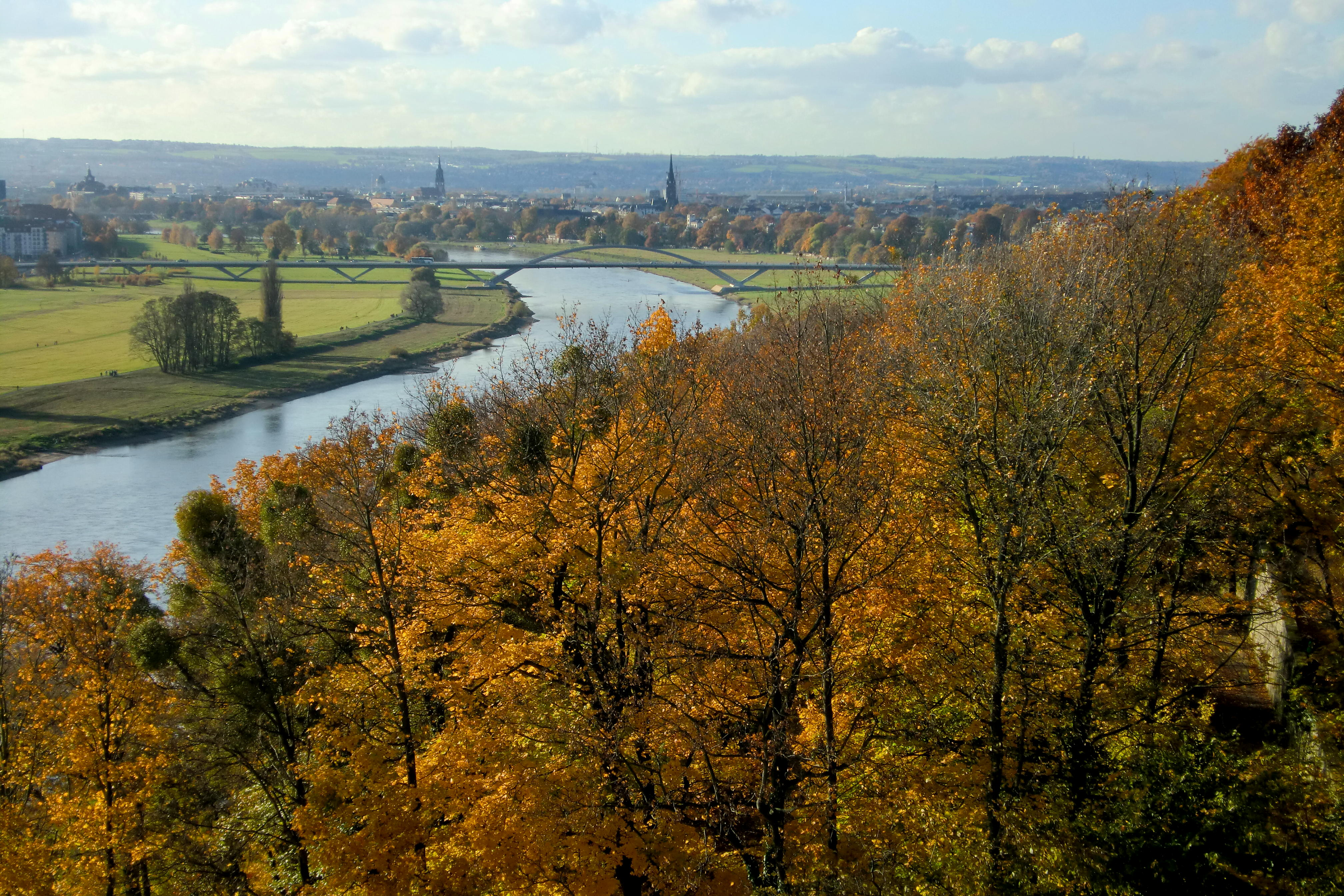
Elbe Valley with Waldschlösschen Bridge

Plans to build the four-lane Waldschlösschen Bridge across the valley proved controversial. In 2006, the UNESCO World Heritage Committee placed the Dresden Elbe Valley on its List of World Heritage in Danger and threatened to remove it from the World Heritage Site list. According to the committee's official website, the committee determined that "plans to build a bridge across the Elbe would have such a serious impact on the integrity of property's landscape that it may no longer deserve to be on the World Heritage List," and therefore decided to place the Dresden Elbe Valley on the List of World Heritage Sites in Danger "with a view to also consider, in a prudent manner, delisting the site from the World Heritage List in 2007 if the plans were carried through."

Though the bridge was approved in a referendum in 2005, the city council decided on 20 July 2006 to stop the invitation to bid on contracts to build the bridge. However, after several court decisions, the city was forced to begin building the bridge at the end of 2007 until further court hearings could be held in 2008.

In July 2008, the UNESCO World Heritage Committee decided to keep the Dresden Elbe Valley on the World Heritage List in the hope that the construction would be stopped and the integrity of the landscape restored. If not, the property would be deleted from the World Heritage List in 2009.

In June 2009 at a UNESCO meeting in Seville, the World Heritage Committee decided in a 14 to 5 vote with 2 abstentions to revoke the Dresden Elbe Valley's status as a World Heritage Site.

== See also ==
- Former UNESCO World Heritage Sites
- List of regions of Saxony
