= World Heritage Site =

Place of significance listed by UNESCO

- The World Heritage emblem, used to identify properties protected by the World Heritage Convention
- Formation: 1978 (48 years ago)
- Founded at: Galápagos Islands
- Type: UNESCO Landmarks and areas legal protection and sites listing agency
- Purpose: UNESCO landmarks and areas protection
- Region served: Worldwide
- Main organ: UNESCO

World Heritage Sites are landmarks and areas with legal protection under an international treaty administered by UNESCO for having cultural, historical, or scientific significance. The sites are judged to contain "cultural and natural heritage around the world considered to be of outstanding value to humanity".

To be selected, a World Heritage Site is nominated by its host country and determined by the UNESCO's World Heritage Committee to be a unique landmark which is geographically and historically identifiable, having a special cultural or physical significance, and to be under a sufficient system of legal protection. World Heritage Sites might be ancient ruins or historical structures, buildings, cities, (Note: In 1978, two entire cities were declared UNESCO World Heritage Sites: first Quito in Ecuador, and later Kraków in Poland.) deserts, forests, islands, lakes, monuments, mountains, wilderness areas, memorial sites and others.

A World Heritage Site may signify a remarkable accomplishment of humankind and serve as evidence of humanity's intellectual history on the planet, or it might be a place of great natural beauty. As of July 2026, a total of 1,273 World Heritage Sites exist across 173 countries.

The sites are intended for practical conservation for posterity, which otherwise would be subject to risk from human or animal trespassing, unmonitored, uncontrolled or unrestricted access, or threat from local administrative negligence. Sites are demarcated by UNESCO as protected zones. The World Heritage Sites list is maintained by the international World Heritage Program administered by the UNESCO World Heritage Committee, composed of 21 "states parties" that are elected by the United Nations General Assembly, and advised by reviews of international panels of experts in natural or cultural history, and education.

The Program catalogues, names, and conserves sites of outstanding cultural or natural importance to the common culture and heritage of humankind. The programme began with the Convention Concerning the Protection of the World Cultural and Natural Heritage, which was adopted by the General Conference of UNESCO on 16 November 1972. Since then, 196 states have ratified the convention, making it one of the most widely recognised international agreements and the world's most popular cultural programme.

== History ==
=== Origin ===
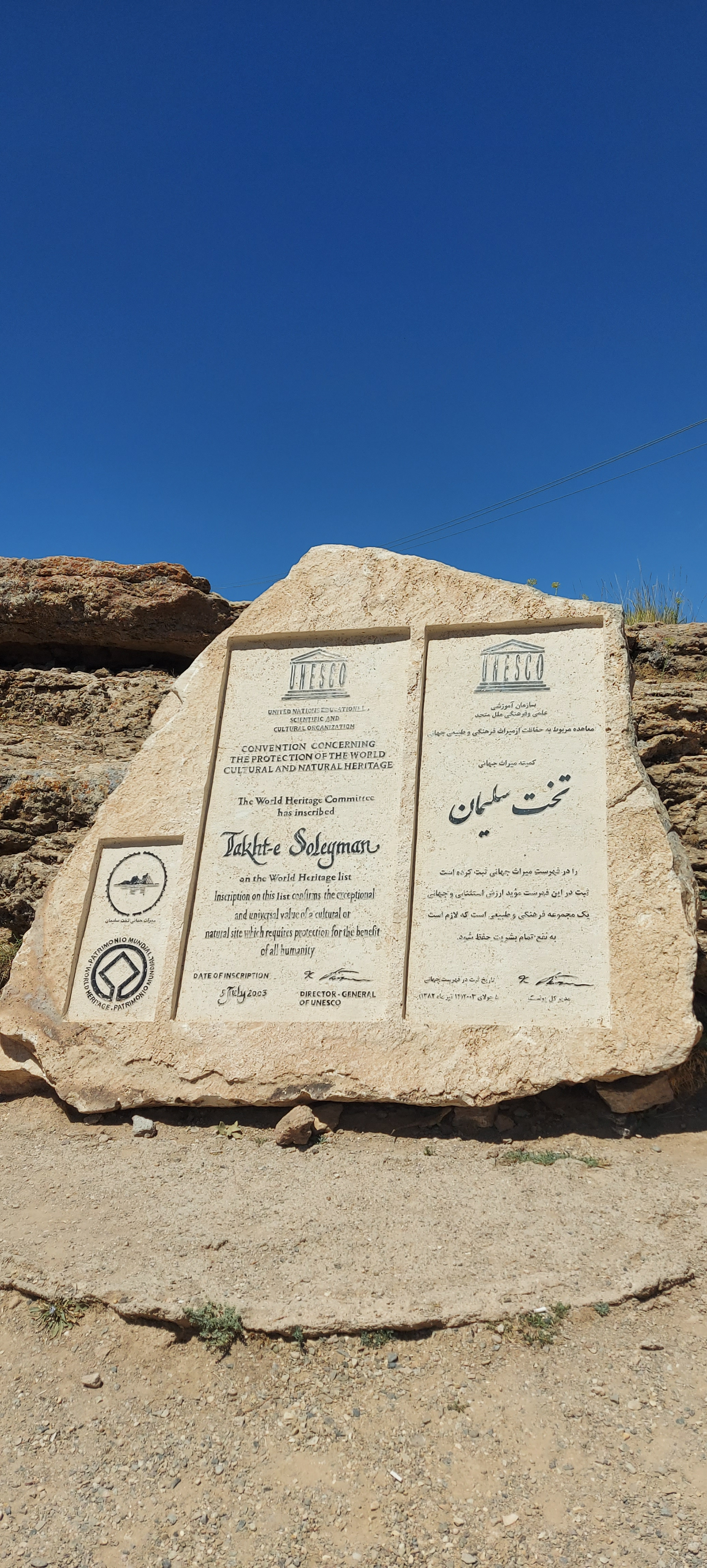
UNESCO World Heritage plaque at Takht-e Soleymān in Iran

In 1954, the government of Egypt decided to build the new Aswan High Dam, whose resulting future reservoir would eventually inundate a large stretch of the Nile valley containing cultural treasures of ancient Egypt and ancient Nubia. In 1959, the governments of Egypt and Sudan requested the United Nations Educational, Scientific and Cultural Organization (UNESCO) to assist them to protect and rescue the endangered monuments and sites.

In 1960, the Director-General of UNESCO launched the International Campaign to Save the Monuments of Nubia. This resulted in the excavation and recording of hundreds of sites, the recovery of thousands of objects, as well as the salvage and relocation to higher ground of several important temples. The most famous of these are the temple complexes of Abu Simbel and Philae. The campaign ended in 1980 and was considered a success. To thank countries which especially contributed to the campaign's success, Egypt donated four temples; the Temple of Dendur was moved to the Metropolitan Museum of Art in New York City, the Temple of Debod to the Parque del Oeste in Madrid, the Temple of Taffeh to the Rijksmuseum van Oudheden in Leiden, and the Temple of Ellesyia to Museo Egizio in Turin.

The project cost US$80 million (equivalent to $312.6 million in 2025), about $40 million of which was collected from 50 countries. The project's success led to other safeguarding campaigns, such as saving Venice and its lagoon in Italy, the ruins of Mohenjo-daro in Pakistan, and the Borobodur Temple Compounds in Indonesia. Together with the International Council on Monuments and Sites, UNESCO then initiated a draft convention to protect cultural heritage.

=== Convention and background ===
The convention (the signed document of international agreement) guiding the work of the World Heritage Committee was developed over a seven-year period (1965–1972). The United States initiated the idea of safeguarding places of high cultural or natural importance. A White House conference in 1965 called for a "World Heritage Trust" to preserve "the world's superb natural and scenic areas and historic sites for the present and the future of the entire world citizenry". The International Union for Conservation of Nature developed similar proposals in 1968, which were presented in 1972 at the United Nations Conference on the Human Environment in Stockholm. Under the World Heritage Committee, signatory countries are required to produce and submit periodic data reporting providing the committee with an overview of each participating nation's implementation of the World Heritage Convention and a "snapshot" of current conditions at World Heritage properties.

Based on the draft convention that UNESCO had initiated, a single text was eventually agreed upon by all parties, and the Convention Concerning the Protection of the World Cultural and Natural Heritage was adopted by the General Conference of UNESCO on 16 November 1972. The convention came into force on 17 December 1975. As of November 2024, it has been ratified by 196 states: 192 UN member states, two UN observer states (the Holy See and the State of Palestine), and two states in free association with New Zealand (the Cook Islands and Niue). Only one UN member state, Liechtenstein, has not ratified the convention.

== Objectives ==
By assigning places as World Heritage Sites, UNESCO wants to help preserve them for future generations. Its motivation is that "heritage is our legacy from the past, what we live with today" and that both cultural and natural heritage are "irreplaceable sources of life and inspiration". UNESCO's mission with respect to World Heritage consists of eight sub targets. These include encouraging the commitment of countries and local population to World Heritage conservation in various ways, providing emergency assistance for sites in danger, offering technical assistance and professional training, and supporting States Parties' public awareness-building activities.

Being listed as a World Heritage Site can positively affect the site, its environment, and interactions between them. A listed site gains international recognition and legal protection, and can obtain funds from, among others, the World Heritage Fund to facilitate its conservation under certain conditions. UNESCO reckons the restorations of the following four sites among its success stories: Angkor in Cambodia, the Old City of Dubrovnik in Croatia, the Wieliczka Salt Mine near Kraków in Poland, and the Ngorongoro Conservation Area in Tanzania. Additionally, the local population around a site may benefit from significantly increased tourism revenue. When there are significant interactions between people and the natural environment, these can be recognised as "cultural landscapes". (Note: This type of recognition exists since 1992.)

== Nomination process ==
A country must first identify its significant cultural and natural sites in a document known as the Tentative List. Next, it can place sites selected from that list into a Nomination File, which is evaluated by the International Council on Monuments and Sites and the World Conservation Union. A country may not nominate sites that have not been first included on its Tentative List. The two international bodies make recommendations to the World Heritage Committee for new designations. The Committee meets once a year to determine which nominated properties to add to the World Heritage List; sometimes it defers its decision or requests more information from the country that nominated the site. There are ten selection criteria – a site must meet at least one to be included on the list.

== Selection criteria ==
Until 2004, there were six sets of criteria for cultural heritage and four for natural heritage. In 2005, UNESCO modified these and now has one set of ten criteria. Nominated sites must be of "outstanding universal value" and must meet at least one of the ten criteria.

=== Cultural ===
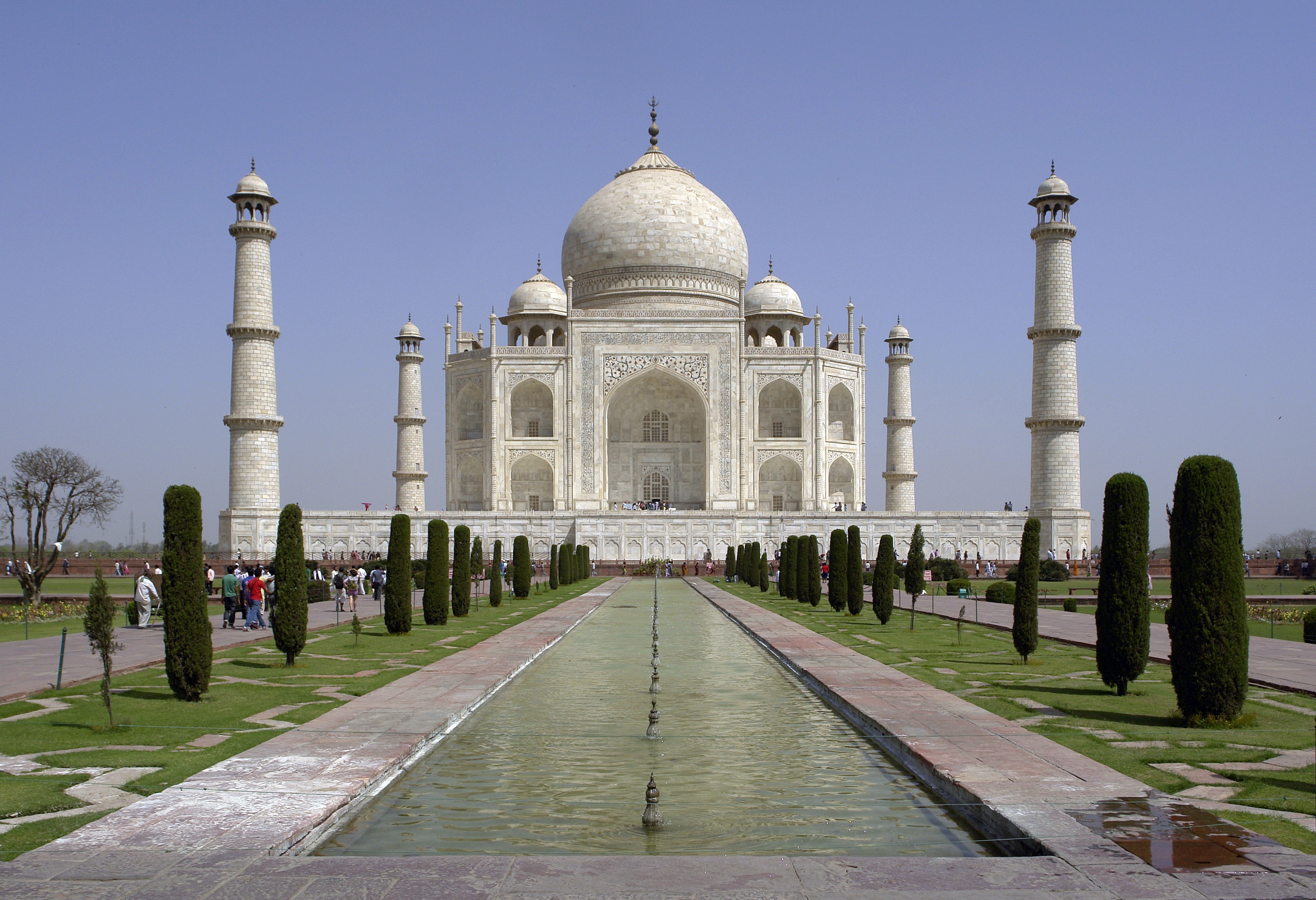
Site No. 252: Taj Mahal in India, an example of a cultural heritage site

1. "To represent a masterpiece of human creative genius"
2. "To exhibit an important interchange of human values, over a span of time or within a cultural area of the world, on developments in architecture or technology, monumental arts, town-planning or landscape design"
3. "To bear a unique or at least exceptional testimony to a cultural tradition or to a civilization which is living, or which has disappeared"
4. "To be an outstanding example of a type of building, architectural or technological ensemble or landscape which illustrates (a) significant stage(s) in human history"
5. "To be an outstanding example of a traditional human settlement, land-use, or sea-use which is representative of a culture (or cultures), or human interaction with the environment especially when it has become vulnerable under the impact of irreversible change"
6. "To be directly or tangibly associated with events or living traditions, with ideas, or with beliefs, with artistic and literary works of outstanding universal significance" (Note: The World Heritage Committee considers that this criterion should preferably be used in conjunction with other criteria.)

=== Natural ===
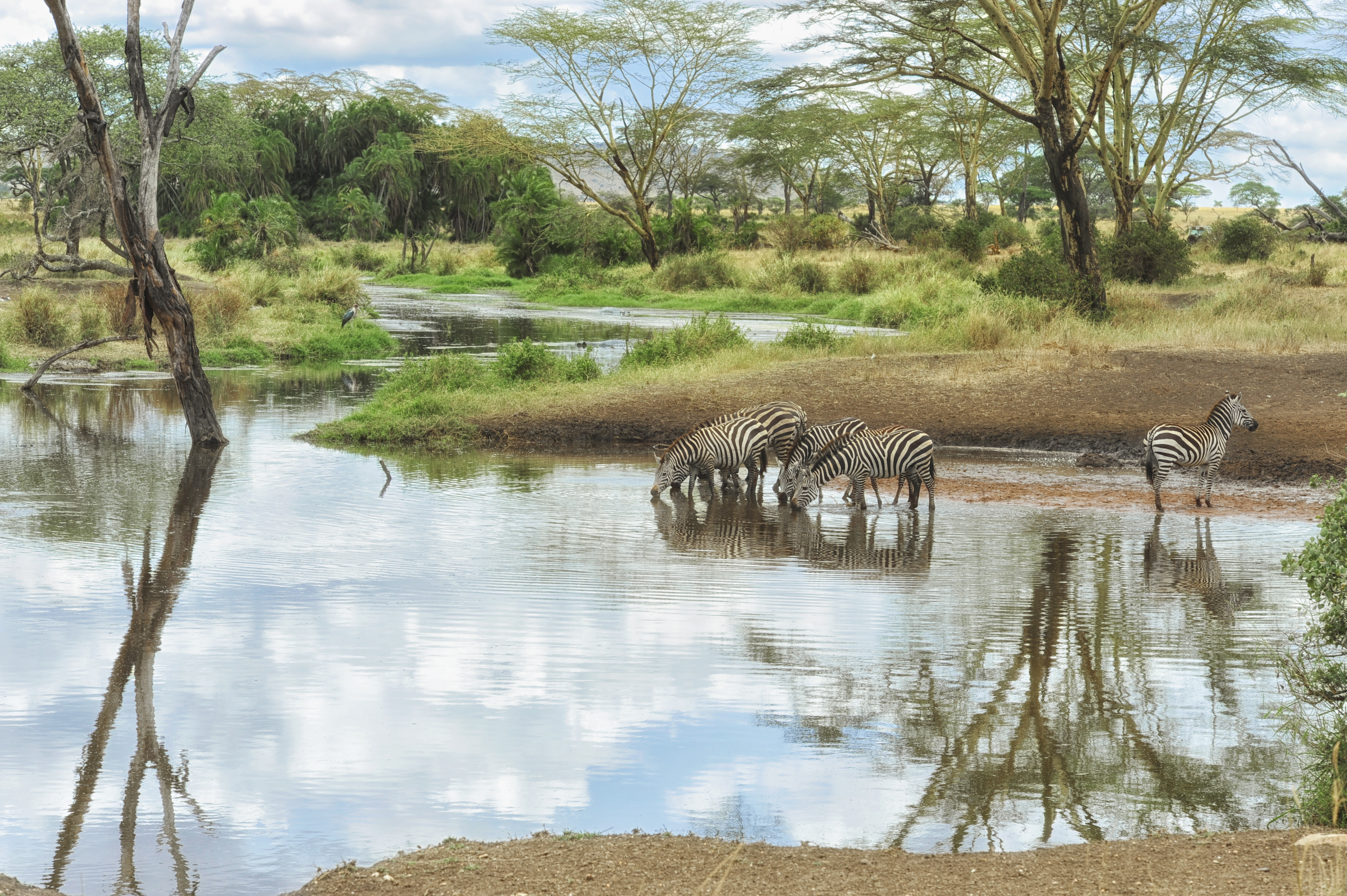
Site No. 156: Serengeti National Park in Tanzania, a natural heritage site

Site No. 274: Historic Sanctuary of Machu Picchu in Peru, an example of a mixed (natural and cultural) heritage site

7. "To contain superlative natural phenomena or areas of exceptional natural beauty and aesthetic importance"
8. "To be outstanding examples representing major stages of earth's history, including the record of life, significant on-going geological processes in the development of landforms, or significant geomorphic or physiographic features"
9. "To be outstanding examples representing significant on-going ecological and biological processes in the evolution and development of terrestrial, fresh water, coastal and marine ecosystems and communities of plants and animals"
10. "To contain the most important and significant natural habitats for in-situ conservation of biological diversity, including those containing threatened species of outstanding universal value from the point of view of science or conservation"

== Extensions and other modifications ==
A country may request to extend or reduce the boundaries, modify the official name, or change the selection criteria of one of its already listed sites. Any proposal for a significant boundary change or to modify the site's selection criteria must be submitted as if it were a new nomination, including first placing it on the Tentative List and then onto the Nomination File.

A request for a minor boundary change, one that does not have a significant impact on the extent of the property or affect its "outstanding universal value", is also evaluated by the advisory bodies before being sent to the committee. Such proposals can be rejected by either the advisory bodies or the Committee if they judge it to be a significant change instead of a minor one. Proposals to change a site's official name are sent directly to the committee.

== Endangerment ==
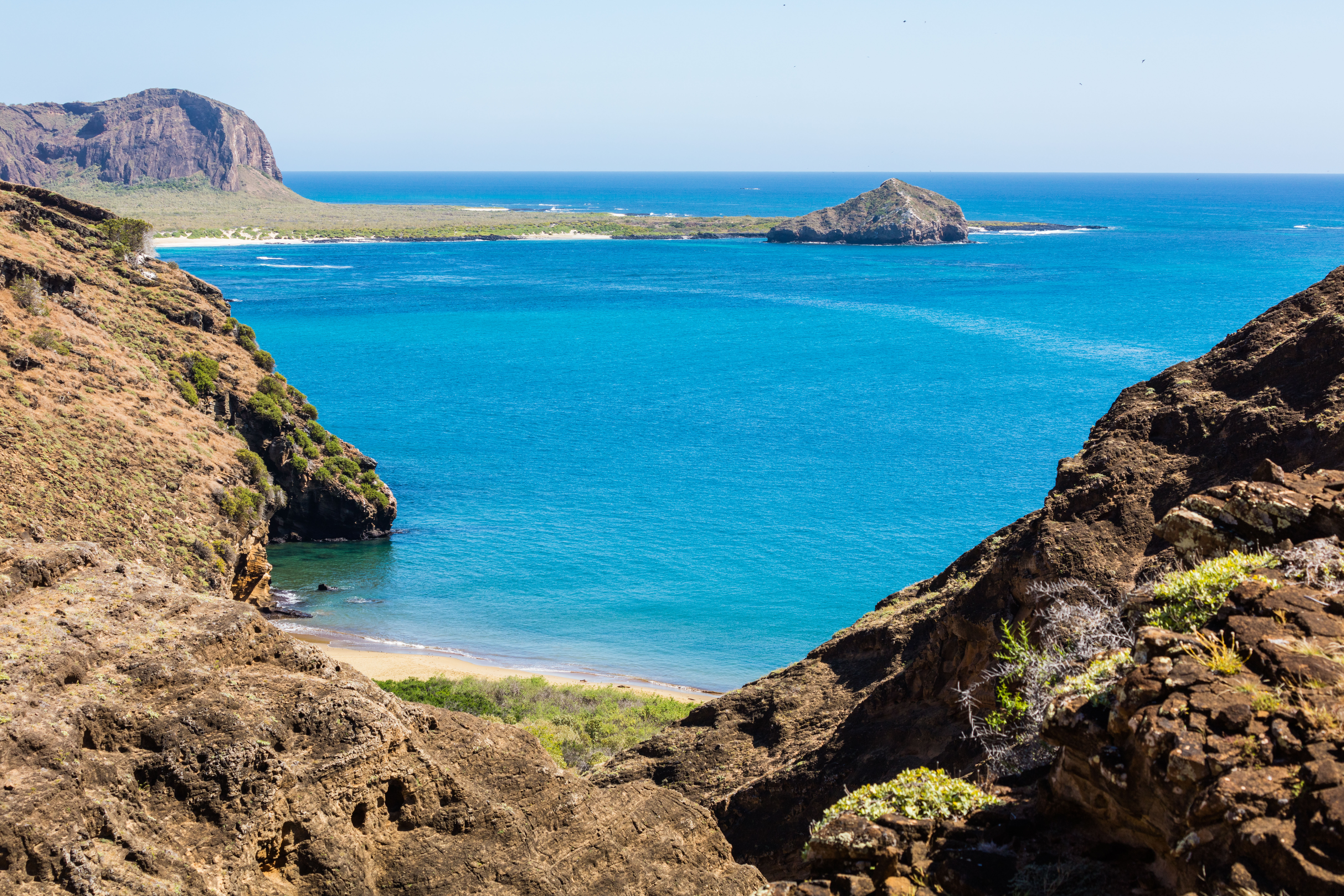
The Galápagos Islands (World Heritage Site No. 1) in the Pacific Ocean off the coast of South America, had its boundaries extended in 2001 and 2003, and was included on the danger list from 2007 to 2010.

A site may be added to the List of World Heritage in Danger if conditions threaten the characteristics for which the landmark or area was inscribed on the World Heritage List. Such problems may involve armed conflict and war, natural disasters, pollution, poaching, or uncontrolled urbanisation or human development. This danger list is intended to increase international awareness of the threats and to encourage counteractive measures. Threats to a site can be either proven imminent threats or potential dangers that could have adverse effects on a site.

The state of conservation for each site on the danger list is reviewed yearly; after this, the Committee may request additional measures, delete the property from the danger list if the threats have ceased, or consider deletion from the World Heritage List entirely if the site's integrity no longer exists or has fallen out of local protection. Only three sites have ever been delisted: the Arabian Oryx Sanctuary in Oman, the Dresden Elbe Valley in Germany, and the Liverpool Maritime Mercantile City in the United Kingdom.

The Arabian Oryx Sanctuary was directly delisted in 2007, instead of first being put on the danger list, after the Omani government decided to reduce the protected area's size by 90%. The Dresden Elbe Valley was first placed on the danger list in 2006 when the World Heritage Committee decided that plans to construct the Waldschlösschen Bridge would significantly alter the valley's landscape. In response, the Dresden City Council attempted to stop the bridge's construction. However, after several court decisions allowed the building of the bridge to proceed, the valley was removed from the World Heritage List in 2009. Liverpool's World Heritage status was revoked in July 2021, following developments (Liverpool Waters and Bramley-Moore Dock Stadium) on the northern docks of the World Heritage site leading to the "irreversible loss of (historical) attributes" on the site.

The first global assessment to quantitatively measure threats to Natural World Heritage Sites found that 63% of sites have been damaged by increasing human pressures including encroaching roads, agriculture infrastructure and settlements over the last two decades. These activities endanger Natural World Heritage Sites and could compromise their unique values. Of the Natural World Heritage Sites that contain forest, 91% experienced some loss since 2000. Many of them are more threatened than previously thought and require immediate conservation action such as that undertaken by Kerala's rainforest gardeners.

== Criticism ==
The UNESCO-administered project has attracted criticism. This was caused by perceived under-representation of heritage sites outside Europe, disputed decisions on site selection and adverse impact of mass tourism on sites unable to manage rapid growth in visitor numbers. A large lobbying industry has grown around the awards, because World Heritage listing can significantly increase tourism returns. Site listing bids are often lengthy and costly, putting poorer countries at a disadvantage. Eritrea's efforts to promote Asmara are one example.

In 2016, the Australian government was reported to have successfully lobbied for the World Heritage Site Great Barrier Reef conservation efforts to be removed from a UNESCO report titled "World Heritage and Tourism in a Changing Climate". The Australian government's actions, involving considerable expense for lobbying and visits for diplomats, were in response to their concern about the negative impact that an "at risk" label could have on tourism revenue at a previously designated UNESCO World Heritage Site.

In 2021, international scientists recommended UNESCO to put the Great Barrier Reef on the endangered list, as global climate change had caused a further negative state of the corals and water quality. Again, the Australian government campaigned against this, and in July 2021, the World Heritage Committee, made up of diplomatic representatives of 21 countries, ignored UNESCO's assessment, based on studies of scientists, "that the reef was clearly in danger from climate change and so should be placed on the list." According to environmental protection groups, this "decision was a victory for cynical lobbying and [...] Australia, as custodians of the world's biggest coral reef, was now on probation."

Several listed locations, such as Casco Viejo in Panama and Hội An in Vietnam, have struggled to strike a balance between the economic benefits of catering to greatly increased visitor numbers after the recognition and preserving the original culture and local communities.

Another criticism is that there is a homogeneity to these sites, which contain similar styles, visitor centres, etc., meaning that a lot of the individuality of these sites has been removed to become more attractive to tourists.

Anthropologist Jasper Chalcraft said that World Heritage recognition often ignores contemporary local usage of certain sites. This leads to conflicts on the local level which can result in the site being damaged. Rock art under world heritage protection at the Tadrart Acacus in Libya have occasionally been intentionally destroyed. Chalcraft links this destruction to Libyan national authorities prioritizing World Heritage status over local sensibilities by limiting access to the sites without consulting with the local population.

UNESCO has also been criticized for alleged geographic bias, racism, and colourism in world heritage inscription. A major chunk of all world heritage inscriptions are located in regions whose populations generally have lighter skin, including Europe, East Asia, and North America.

== Statistics ==
A graph representing the number of UNESCO sites inscribed on the World Heritage List each year for each continent

The World Heritage Committee has divided the world into five geographic regions: Africa, Arab states, Asia and the Pacific, Europe and North America, and Latin America and the Caribbean. Russia and the Caucasus states are classified as European, while Mexico and the Caribbean are classified as belonging to the Latin America and the Caribbean region. The UNESCO geographic regions also give greater emphasis on administrative, rather than geographic associations. Hence, Gough Island, located in the South Atlantic, is part of the Europe and North America region because the British government nominated the site.

The table below includes a breakdown of the sites according to these regions and their classification (as of July 2026):

World Heritage Site by UNESCO region
Region	Cultural	Natural	Mixed	Total	Percentage	States parties with inscribed properties
Africa	65	45	5	115	9.0%	41
Arab states	91	8	3	102	8.0%	18
Asia and the Pacific	228	73 (Note: Includes the sites Uvs Nuur Basin and Landscapes of Dauria located in Mongolia and Russia.)	13	314	24.7%	36
Europe and North America	501 (Note: Includes the site The Architectural Work of Le Corbusier, an Outstanding Contribution to the Modern Movement located in Argentina, Belgium, France, Germany, India, Japan, and Switzerland.)	74	13	588	46.2%	50
Latin America and the Caribbean	106	40	8	154	12.1%	28
Total	991	240	42	1,273	100%	173

=== Countries with 15 or more sites ===
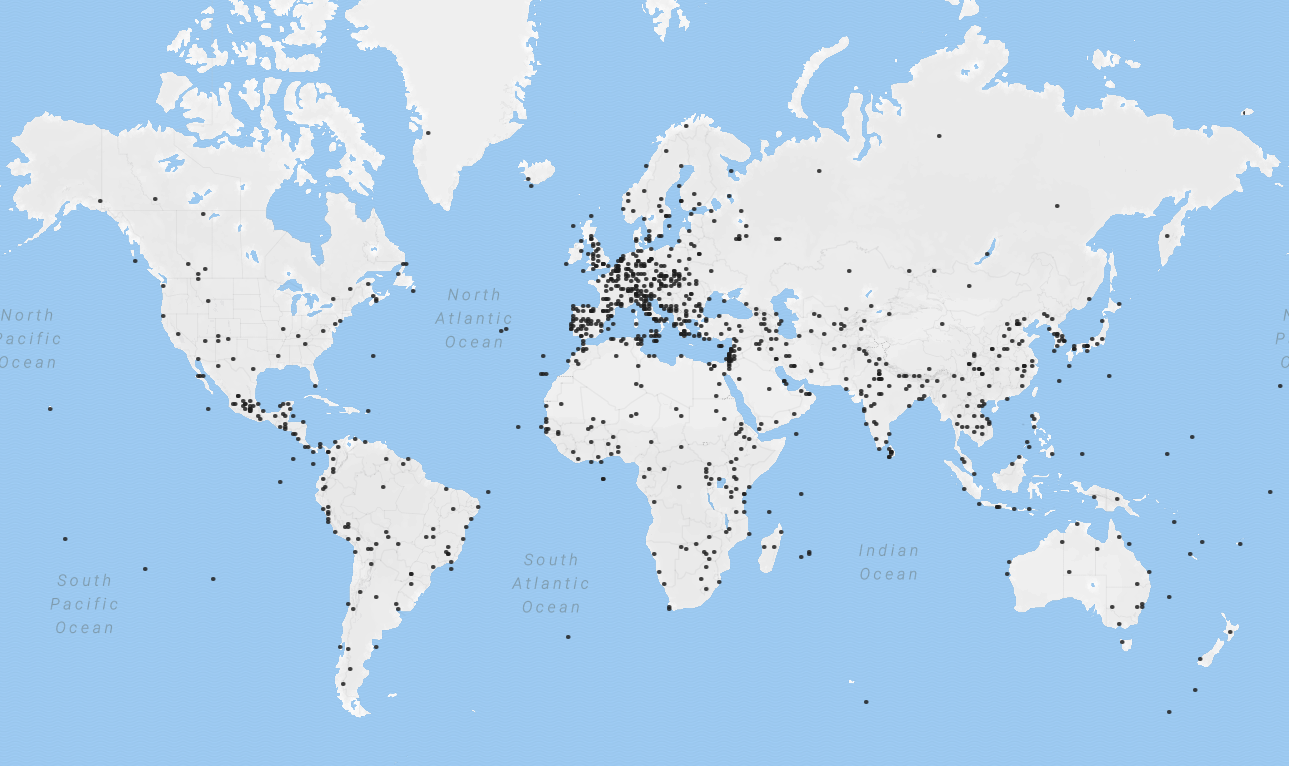
UNESCO World Heritage Sites

This overview lists show the 23 countries with 15 or more World Heritage Sites (As of July 2026):

== Global distribution ==
This interactive map shows the global distribution of UNESCO World Heritage Sites. Selecting a marker opens the corresponding article.

== See also ==
- GoUNESCO – initiative to promote awareness and provide tools for laypersons to engage with heritage
- Index of conservation articles
- Lists of World Heritage Sites
- Former World Heritage Sites
- Memory of the World Programme
- UNESCO Intangible Cultural Heritage Lists
- Ramsar Convention – international agreement on wetlands recognition
