= Al Wusta Wildlife Reserve =

Animal sanctuary in the Omani Central Desert and Coastal Hills

Wildlife Reserve in Al Wusta
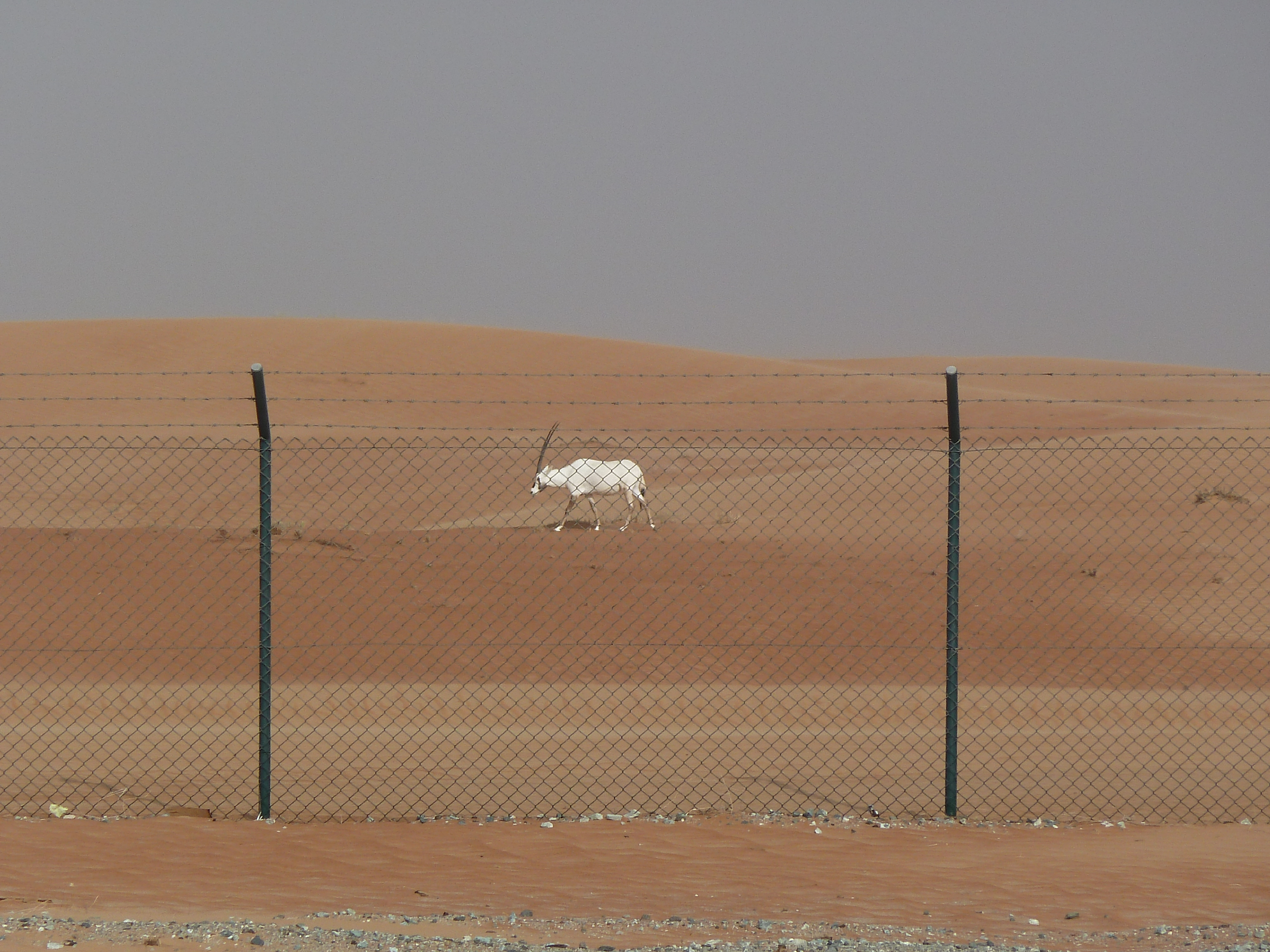
- Interactive map of Wildlife Reserve in Al Wusta
- Location: Al Wusta Governorate, Oman
- Nearest city: Duqm
- Coordinates: 19°42′0″N 57°0′0″E

Former UNESCO World Heritage Site
- Official name: Arabian Oryx Sanctuary
- Designated: 1994
- Reference no.: 654
- Delisted: 2007

Al Wusta Wildlife Reserve, formerly called Arabian Oryx Sanctuary, is a nature reserve in the Omani central desert and coastal hills. In a much larger form it was included in the UNESCO World Heritage list. On 28 June 2007, it became the first site to be removed from the World Heritage Site register. UNESCO cited Oman's decision to reduce the Arabian Oryx Sanctuary by 90% after oil was found at the site, and the decline of the Arabian oryx population from 450 individuals in 1996 to 65 in 2007 as a result of poaching and habitat destruction. At that time, only four mating pairs remained.

Species inhabiting the reserve also included the mountain gazelle, Nubian ibex, Arabian wolf, honey badger and caracal.
