= Seegebiet Mansfelder Land (Verwaltungsgemeinschaft) =

Coordinates: 51°27′N 11°40′E

Seegebiet Mansfelder Land was a Verwaltungsgemeinschaft ("collective municipality") in the Mansfeld-Südharz district, in Saxony-Anhalt, Germany. It was situated between Eisleben and Halle (Saale). The seat of the Verwaltungsgemeinschaft was in Röblingen am See. It was disbanded on 1 January 2010.

The Verwaltungsgemeinschaft Seegebiet Mansfelder Land consisted of the following municipalities:

1. Amsdorf
2. Aseleben
3. Dederstedt
4. Erdeborn
5. Hornburg
6. Lüttchendorf
7. Neehausen
8. Röblingen am See
9. Seeburg
10. Stedten
11. Wansleben am See
