= Hersfeld Tithe Register =

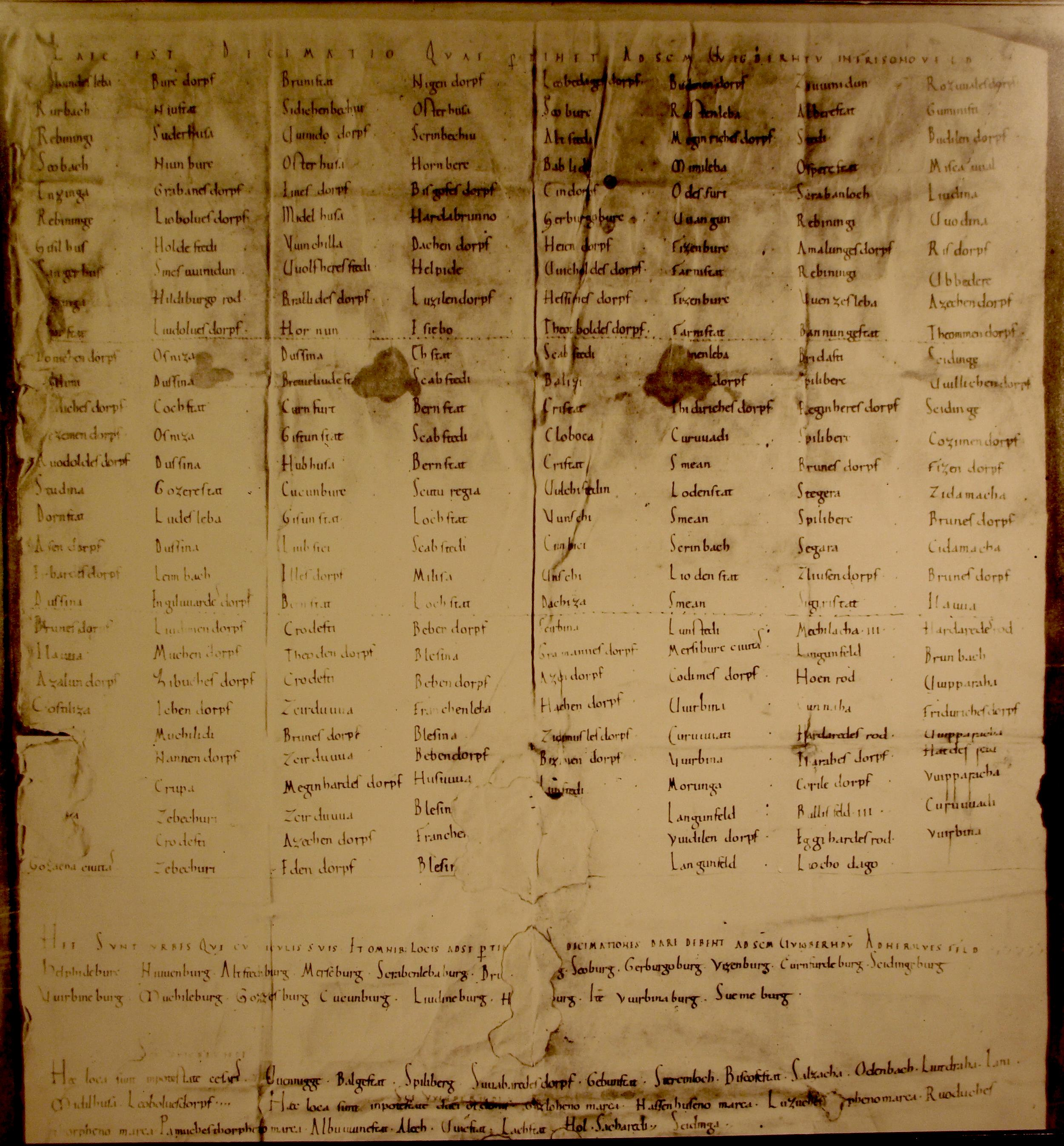
Hersfelder Tithe Register in a transcript from the 11th Century

The Hersfeld Tithe Register (German: Hersfelder Zehntverzeichnis) is a list of the places and castles in the Friesenfeld Gau (territory) and in Hassegau, from which Hersfeld Abbey received tithes. The original document dates from between 881 and 887 or between 896 and 899, but no longer exists. The list is found in a transcript from the 11th Century, which is now in the Hessischen Staatsarchiv Marburg.

The tithe register is divided into four sections. Many placenames are duplicated and triplicated.

The first part was apparently compiled between 830 und 860, and lists under 239 numbers a large number of placenames. The second part and subsequent parts were created during the abbacy of Abbott Harderat between 889 and 899 and was bound with the first part and lists 18 names, each of which ends in '-burg' 2. In the third part 13 places are listed and in the fourth 5 markets and 7 places are listed.

Many modern placenames in the modern day German states of Thuringia and Saxony-Anhalt can be connected with a corresponding name in the register.

== List of Places ==
"Haec est Decimatio quae pertinet ad sanctum Wigberthvm in Frisonoveld" (This the tithe which belongs to the blessed Wigbert in Friesenfeld)

1. [Al]bundesleba – Alvensleben, an abandoned village on the site of present-day Sangerhausen
2. Rurbach – Rohrbach, a Cistercian monastery east of Oberöblingen
3. Rebiningi – Oberröblingen
4. Seobach – presumably Seebach, a burb of present-day Mühlhausen
5. Enzinga – Einzingen, now a part of Allstedt
6. Rebiningi – Niederröblingen (Helme)
7. Gisilhus – Kieselhausen, an abandoned village to the west of present-day Sangerhausen.
8. Sangerhus – Sangerhausen
9. [R]eotstat – Riestedt, now a part of Sangerhausen
10. Burcdorpf – Burgsdorf
11. Niustat – possibly Nienstedt (now part of Allstedt)
12. Suderhusa – Sotterhausen
13. Niunburc – (Beyer-)Naumburg
14. Grabanesdorpf – Grabesdorf, abandoned village near Beyernaumburg
15. Liobolvesdorpf – Lobesdorf, abandoned village near present-day Sotterhausen
16. Holdestedi – Holdenstedt
17. Sineswinidun – Schweinswende, an abandoned village near Bornstedt
18. Hildiburgorod – Klosterrode, now a part of Blankenheim
19. Liudolvesdorpf
20. Brunistat – Bornstedt (bei Eisleben)
21. Sidichenbechiu – Sittichenbach, now a part of Lutherstadt Eisleben
22. Uuinidodorpf – Wenthdorf, abandoned village near Osterhausen
23. Osterhusa – Groß-Osterhausen
24. Einesdorpf – Einsdorf, now part of Allstedt
25. Midelhusa – Mittelhausen (Allstedt)
26. Winchilla – Winkel (Helme)
27. Uuolfheresstedi – Wolferstedt
28. Brallidesdorpf
29. Hornum
30. Nigendorpf – Klosternaundorf, now part of Allstedt
31. Osterhusa – Klein-Osterhausen
32. Scrinbechiu – Rothenschirmbach, now part of Lutherstadt Eisleben
33. Hornberc – Hornburg, Saxony-Anhalt
34. Bisgofesdorpf – Bischofrode
35. Hardabrunno – Erdeborn
36. Dachendorpf – possibly a variant spelling for Neckendorf, Nachendorpf
37. Helpide – Helfta, now part of Lutherstadt Eisleben
38. Luzilendorpf – Lüttchendorf
39. Scidinge – Burgscheidungen
1. Leobedigasdorpf – Lipsdorf
2. Budinendorpf – Bündorf (Wüstung)
3. Ziuuinidum – Wenden, now part of Mücheln
4. Rozwalesdorpf – possibly Rulsdorf or Schwötzschdorf
1. Seoburc – Seeburg (Mansfelder Land)
2. Rostenleba – Roßleben
3. Alberestat – Alberstedt
4. Guministi – Kunisch
5. Rebiningi – Unterröblingen
6. Budinendorpf – probably Bindorf
1. Altstedi – Allstedt
2. Meginrichesdorpf – probably Memleben or Weningenmemleben
3. Stedi – Stedten (Mansfelder Land)
4. Budilendorpf – Bottendorf (Roßleben-Wiehe)
1. Bablide – Mönchpfiffel, now part of Mönchpfiffel-Nikolausrieth
2. Mimileba – Memleben or Weningenmemleben
3. Osperestat – Esperstedt (Obhausen)
4. Miscawe – vermutlich Meuschau
1. Eindorf – vielleicht Einsdorf
2. Odesfurt – Oßfurt
3. Scrabanloch – Schraplau
4. Gerburgoburc – Korbesberg
5. Wangen – [Klein-]Wangen
6. Wodina
7. Dachendorpf
8. Heiendorpf – Hayndorf
9. Fizinburc – Vitzenburg, since 2004 a part of Querfurt
10. Scidinga – Kirchscheidungen

== Castles ==
„Haec sunt urbes que cum viculis suis et omnibus locis ad se perti[nentibus] decimationes dare debent ad sanctum Wigberhdym ad Herolvesfeld“ (These are the castles with their farmsteads and all localities which must give tithes to the blessed Wigbert in Herodsfeld)

1. Helphideburc – Helfta Castle, now part of Lutherstadt Eisleben
2. Niuuenburg – Beyernaumburg
3. Altstediburg – Allstedt Castle
4. Merseburg – Merseburg
5. Scrabenlebaburg – Schraplau
6. Bru[nstedibur]g- Bornstedt, Schweinsburg
7. Seoburg – Seeburg
8. Gerburgoburg – Korbesberg
9. Vizenburg – Vitzenburg Castle in Querfurt
10. Curnfurdeburg – Querfurt Castle
11. Scidingeburg – Burgscheidungen Castle
12. Uuirbineburg – Burgwerben
13. Muchileburg – Mücheln
14. Gozzesburg – Goseck
15. Cucunburg – Kuckenburg, now part of Esperstedt
16. Liudineburg – Lettin, now part of Halle (Saale)
17. H[unlebab]urg – Holleben, now part of Teutschenthal
18. Vuirbinaburg – eventuell Markwerben
19. Suemeburg – eventuell Schanze bei Korbetha-Wengelsdorf oder eine unbenannte Anlage bei Kraßlau/Leina

== Literature ==
- Georg Landau: Beitrag zur Beschreibung der Gaue Friesenfeld und Hassegau, In: Allgemeines Archiv für die Geschichtskunde des preußischen Staates, 1833, Band 20, S. 213–235
- Hermann Größler: Die Wüstungen des Friesenfeldes und Hassegaues, In: Zeitschrift des Harzvereins für Geschichte und Alterthumskunde. Band 11, 1878, S. 119–231.
- Hermann Größler: Die Bedeutung des Hersfelder Zehntverzeichnisses für die Ortskunde und Geschichte der Gaue Friesenfeld und Hassegaues, In: Zeitschrift des Harzvereins für Geschichte und Alterthumskunde, Band 7, 1874, S. 85–130.
- Hermann Größler: Die Abfassungszeit des Hersfelder Zehntverzeichnis, In: Zeitschrift des Harzvereins für Geschichte und Alterthumskunde, Band 8, 1875 S. 302–310
- Otto Dobenecker: Regesta diplomatica necnon epistolaria historiae Thuringiae. Band 2 (1152–1227). Fischer, Jena 1900, S. 441 f. (Band 1, S. 64–67 ist damit überholt).
- Hans Weirich: Urkundenbuch der Reichsabtei Hersfeld, Band 19, Teil 1, Veröffentlichungen der Historischen Kommission für Hessen und Waldeck, Verlag N.G. Elwert, 1936, S. 65–67
- Ernst Eichler: Slavische Ortsnamen im Hersfelder Zehntverzeichnis. In: Wissenschaftliche Zeitschrift der Karl-Marx-Universität Leipzig, Gesellschafts- und sprachwissenschaftliche Reihe. Band 5, Heft 3, 1955/56, S. 305–309. Wiederabdruck in: Beiträge zur deutsch-slawischen Namenforschung. Leipzig 1985, S. 159–167.
- Heiner Lück: Das Hersfelder Zehntverzeichnis – eine wichtige Quelle für die frühmittelalterliche Geschichte des Saalkreises und seiner Umgebung. In: Heimat-Jahrbuch Saalekreis. Band 11, 2005, S. 12–18.
- Georg Waitz: Die Abfassungszeit des Hersfelder Zehntverzeichnisses. In: Zeitschrift des Harzvereins für Geschichte und Alterthumskunde. Band 8, 1875, S. 302 f.
- Siegmund A. Wolf: Zur Erklärung der Ortsnamen des Hersfelder Zehntverzeichnisses. In: Beiträge zur Namenforschung. Band 6, 1955, S. 292–314 (Nachträge Wolf, Beiträge 1957, 194 Anm. 3).
- Siegmund A. Wolf: Beiträge zur Auswertung des Hersfelder Zehntverzeichnisses. In: Leipziger Studien. Theodor Frings zum 70. Geburtstag (Deutsch-slawische Forschungen zur Namenkunde und Siedlungsgeschichte 5). Halle/Saale 1957, S. 192–235.
- Eberhard Eigendorf: Zur Siedlungskunde des Raumes Eisleben
- Erich Neuß: Besiedlungsgeschichte des Saalkreises und des Mansfelder Landes
- Christian Zschieschang: Das Hersfelder Zehntverzeichnis und die frühmittelalterliche Grenzsituation an der mittleren Saale. Eine namenkundliche Studie. (= Forschungen zur Geschichte und Kultur des östlichen Mitteleuropa, Bd. 52) Böhlau, Wien 2017, ISBN 978-3-412-50721-3 (PDF)
