= Lutherstadt Eisleben (Verwaltungsgemeinschaft) =

Municipality in Saxony-Anhalt, Germany

Coordinates: 51.517°N 11.550°E

Lutherstadt Eisleben was a Verwaltungsgemeinschaft ("collective municipality") in the Mansfeld-Südharz district, in Saxony-Anhalt, Germany. The seat of the Verwaltungsgemeinschaft was in Eisleben. It was disbanded on 1 January 2010.

The Verwaltungsgemeinschaft Lutherstadt Eisleben consisted of the following municipalities:

1. Burgsdorf
2. Eisleben
3. Hedersleben
