= Wansleben =

Wansleben may refer to:

- Johann Michael Vansleb (1635–1679), German theologian, linguist and Egypt traveller
- Wanzleben, a town in the Börde (district), in Saxony-Anhalt, Germany
- Wansleben am See, a German municipality in the Mansfeld-Südharz district
- Wansleben, a subcamp of the Buchenwald concentration camp
