= Röblingen am See =

- Ortsteil of Seegebiet Mansfelder Land
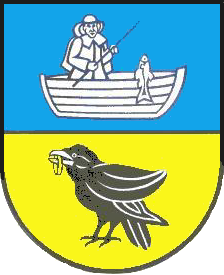
- Coat of arms
- Interactive map of Röblingen am See
- Location within Germany Location within Saxony-Anhalt
- Coordinates: 51°27′N 11°40′E
- Country: Germany
- State: Saxony-Anhalt
- District: Mansfeld-Südharz
- Municipality: Seegebiet Mansfelder Land

Area
  - Total: 13.55 km^{2} (5.23 sq mi)
- Elevation: 109 m (358 ft)

Population (2006-12-31)
  - Total: 3,059
  - Density: 225.8/km^{2} (584.7/sq mi)
- Time zone: UTC+01:00 (CET)
  - Summer (DST): UTC+02:00 (CEST)
- Postal codes: 06317
- Dialling codes: 034774

Röblingen am See is a village and a former municipality in the Mansfeld-Südharz district, Saxony-Anhalt, Germany. Since 1 January 2010, it is part of the municipality Seegebiet Mansfelder Land, of which it is the administrative centre.

== Geography ==
Röblingen am See is situated approximatively 12 km southeast of Eisleben. It has three divisions:

- Neue Siedlung
- Oberröblingen
- Unterröblingen

== History ==
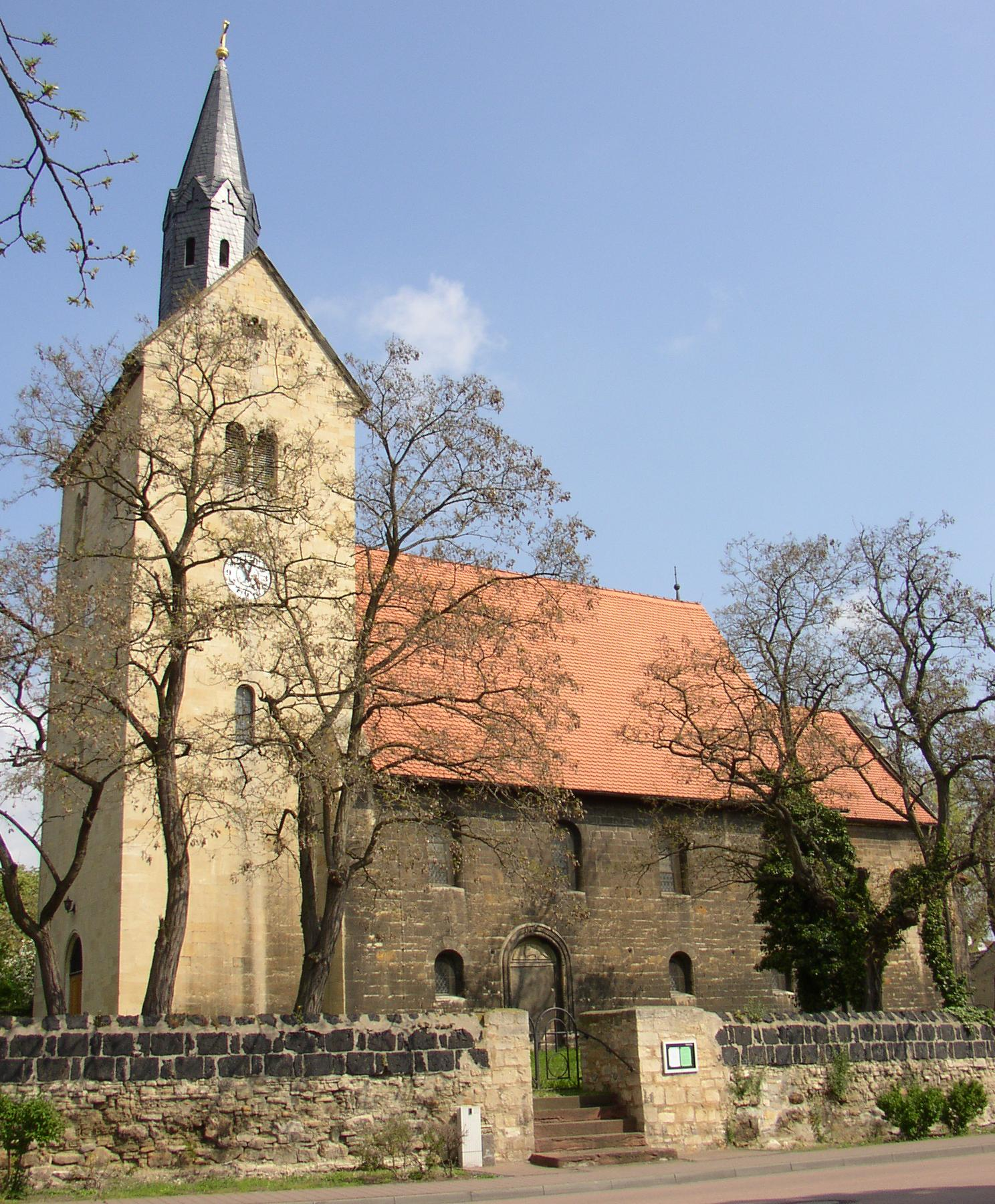
St. Steven's Church

Röbling was first documented with the other three villages as Rebiningi in Friesenfeld in the Hersfeld Abbey tithe directory, which was created between 881 und 899. In 932, Röblingen am See was specifically mentioned in the Hersfeld tithe directory as Seorebiningen in Comitati Sigfridi. The latter date was used in celebrating the 1075th anniversary in 2007.

== Politics ==
=== Mayor ===
Jürgen Ludwig was elected as honorary mayor on 18 May 2003.

=== Coat of arms ===
Blazon: "Parted blue over gold, at the top growing from a silver boat a silver fisherman facing left with a silver fish on the fishhook, at the bottom a black raven standing with a golden ring within the silver beak." ("Geteilt Blau über Gold, oben aus einem silbernen Boot wachsend ein linksgewendeter silberner Fischer mit einem silbernen Fisch an der Angel, unten ein stehender schwarzer Rabe mit goldenem Ring im silbernen Schnabel.")

=== Flag ===
The flag of the municipality is horizontally striped black and yellow, with the coat of arms in the middle.

== Culture and sightseeing ==
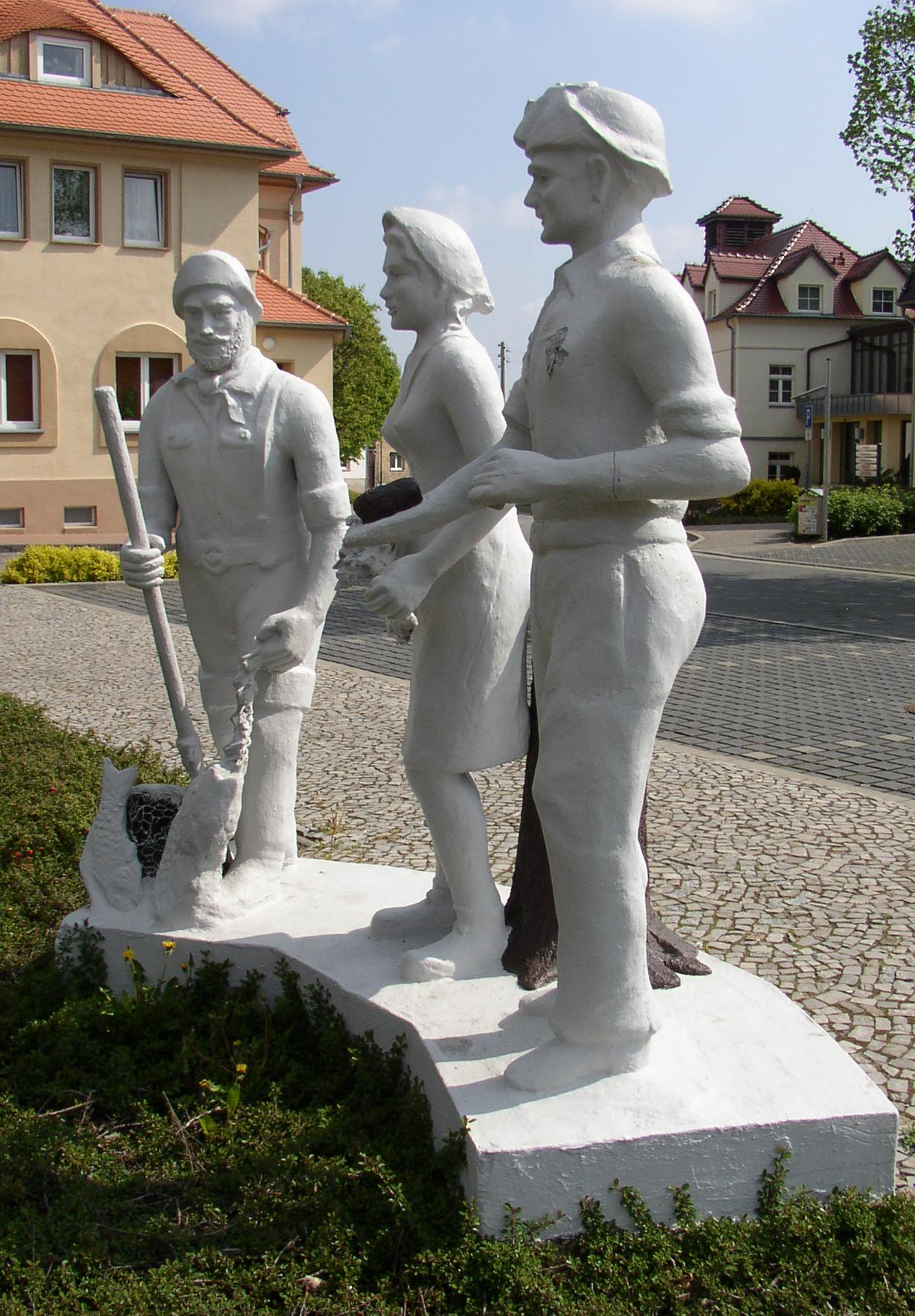
Denkmal

Röblingen has a Protestant church, St. Stephanuskirche (St. Steven's Church).

Im Sommer jedes Jahres wird das Fest am salzigen See veranstaltet.

== Infrastructure ==
Bundesstraße 80 runs 3 km north of Röblingen, connecting Eisleben und Halle (Saale). Röblingen has a train station.

== Literature ==
- Willi Ule: Die Mansfelder Seen und die Vorgänge an denselben im Jahre 1892. erschienen 1895, eine neue Auflage erschien im Dingsda-Verlag, Querfurt 1994, ISBN 3-928498-29-0
