= Schmalzerode =

- Stadtteil of Eisleben
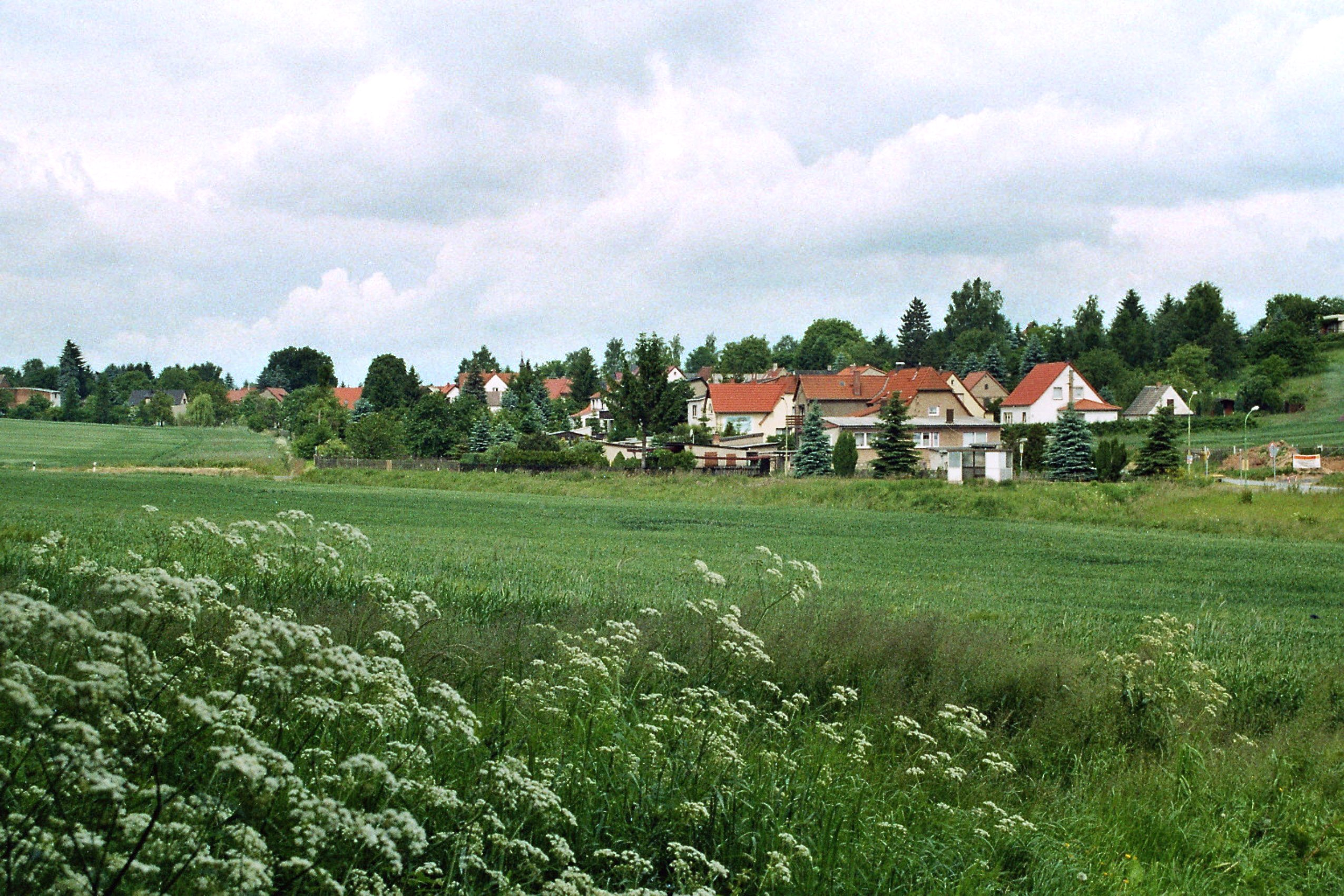
- Schmalzerode
- Interactive map of Schmalzerode
- Location within Germany Location within Saxony-Anhalt
- Coordinates: 51°30′N 11°30′E
- Country: Germany
- State: Saxony-Anhalt
- District: Mansfeld-Südharz
- Town: Eisleben

Area
  - Total: 1.25 km^{2} (0.48 sq mi)
- Elevation: 289 m (948 ft)

Population (2006-12-31)
  - Total: 287
  - Density: 230/km^{2} (595/sq mi)
- Time zone: UTC+01:00 (CET)
  - Summer (DST): UTC+02:00 (CEST)
- Postal codes: 06295
- Dialling codes: 03475

Schmalzerode is a village and a former municipality in the Mansfeld-Südharz district, in Saxony-Anhalt, Germany. Since 1 January 2009, it is part of the town Eisleben.
