= Martin Luther's Birth House =

UNESCO World Heritage Site
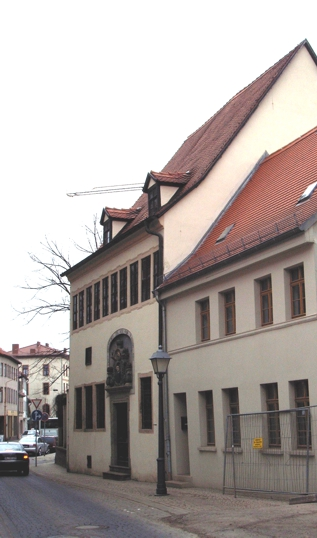

- Location within Germany Location within Saxony-Anhalt
- Official name: Luther's birthplace
- Location: Eisleben, Mansfeld-Südharz, Sachsen-Anhalt, Germany
- Part of: Luther Memorials in Eisleben and Wittenberg
- Criteria: Cultural: (iv)(vi)
- Reference: 783-001
- Inscription: 1996 (20th Session)
- Area: 0.08 ha (0.20 acres)
- Buffer zone: 0.56 ha (1.4 acres)
- Coordinates: 51°31′36.90″N 11°33′1.20″E

Martin Luther's Birth House (German: Martin Luthers Geburtshaus) is a building and museum in Eisleben, Germany. The German religious reformer Martin Luther was born there in 1483. However, the actual house in which Luther was born no longer exists, it having been burnt completely to the ground in 1689. A new building was built on the original site and was opened to the public in 1693, although it did not adhere to the original floor plan and size of the former house. An excavation was carried out in 2006, revealing pottery shards and a clay floor from the original house.

In 1996, Luther's birth house became a UNESCO World Heritage Site along with the house where he died and other sites associated with Luther in Wittenberg because of their religious significance and their testimony to one of the most influential figures in medieval Europe. In 2005-2007 an expansion was added for visitors (project: Springer Architekten, Berlin); the ensemble has since received five architectural awards.

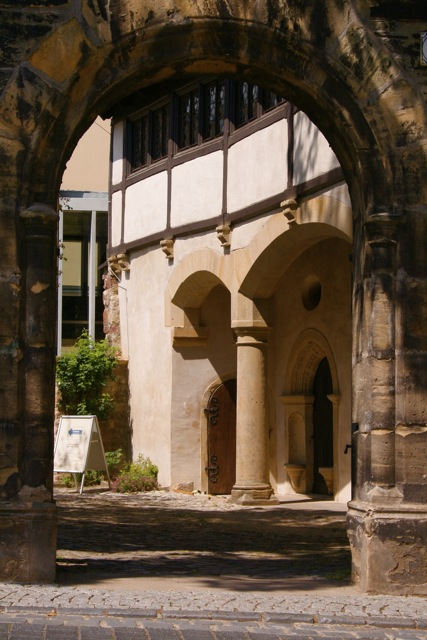
The court of Luthers Birth House
