= Seegebiet Mansfelder Land =

- Municipality
- Location of Seegebiet Mansfelder Land within Mansfeld-Südharz district
- Interactive map of Seegebiet Mansfelder Land
- Location within Germany Location within Saxony-Anhalt
- Coordinates: 51°28′N 11°41′E
- Country: Germany
- State: Saxony-Anhalt
- District: Mansfeld-Südharz

Government
  - Mayor (2023–30): Martin Blümel

Area
  - Total: 107.92 km^{2} (41.67 sq mi)
- Elevation: 95 m (312 ft)

Population (2025-12-31)
  - Total: 8,429
  - Density: 78.10/km^{2} (202.3/sq mi)
- Time zone: UTC+01:00 (CET)
  - Summer (DST): UTC+02:00 (CEST)
- Postal codes: 06317, 06295
- Dialling codes: 034776, 034774, 034601 (Amsdorf, Wansleben am See), 034773 (Dederstedt, Neehausen), 03475 (Lüttchendorf, Neehausen)
- Vehicle registration: MSH, EIL, HET, ML, SGH

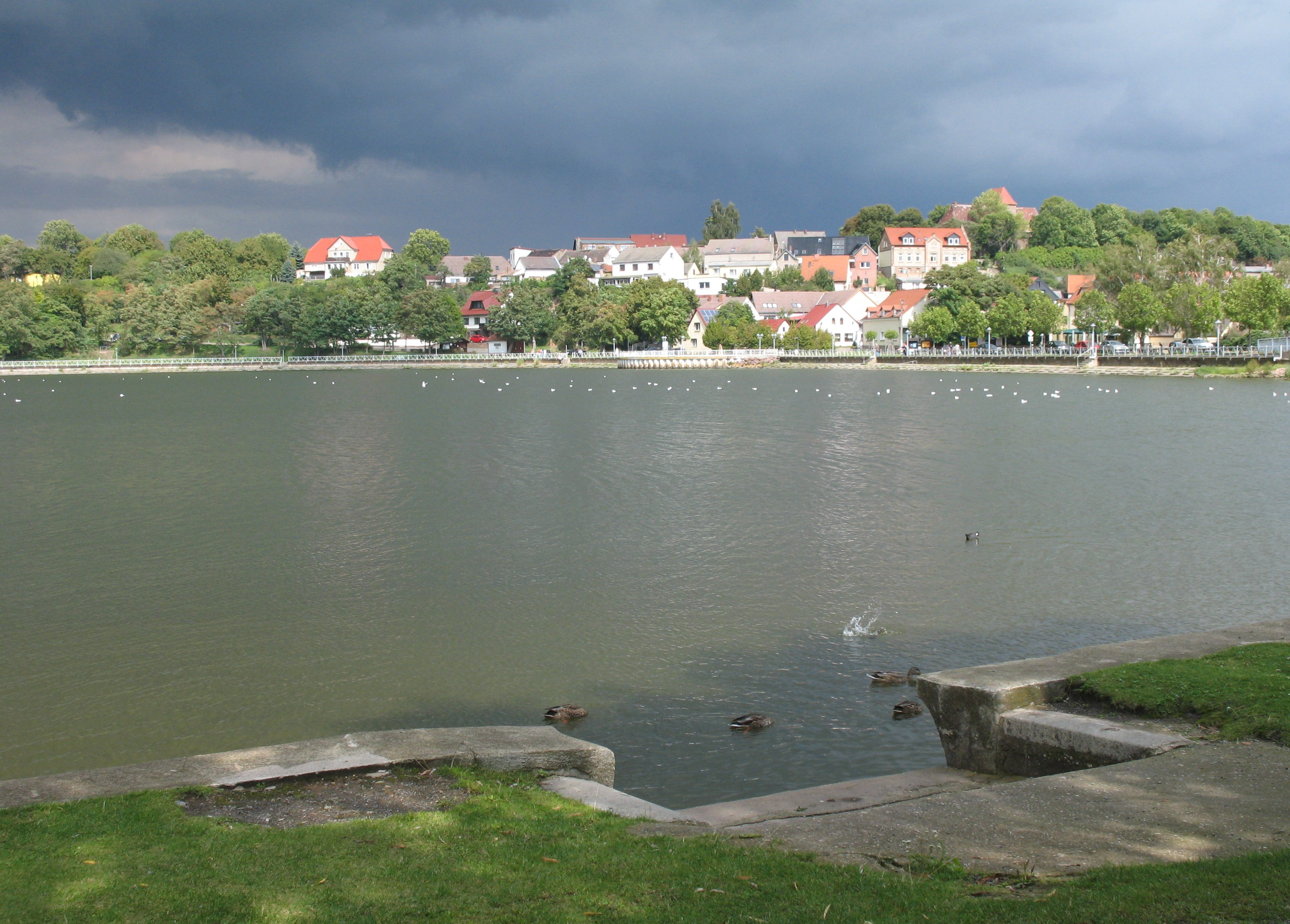
Seeburg

Seegebiet Mansfelder Land is a municipality in the Mansfeld-Südharz district, Saxony-Anhalt, Germany. It was formed on 1 January 2010 by the merger of the former municipalities Amsdorf, Aseleben, Erdeborn, Hornburg, Lüttchendorf, Neehausen, Röblingen am See, Seeburg, Stedten and Wansleben am See. On 1 September 2010 Dederstedt was absorbed into the municipality. These 11 former municipalities are now Ortschaften or municipal divisions of Seegebiet Mansfelder Land.
