= Werner Rataiczyk =

German painter (1921–2021)

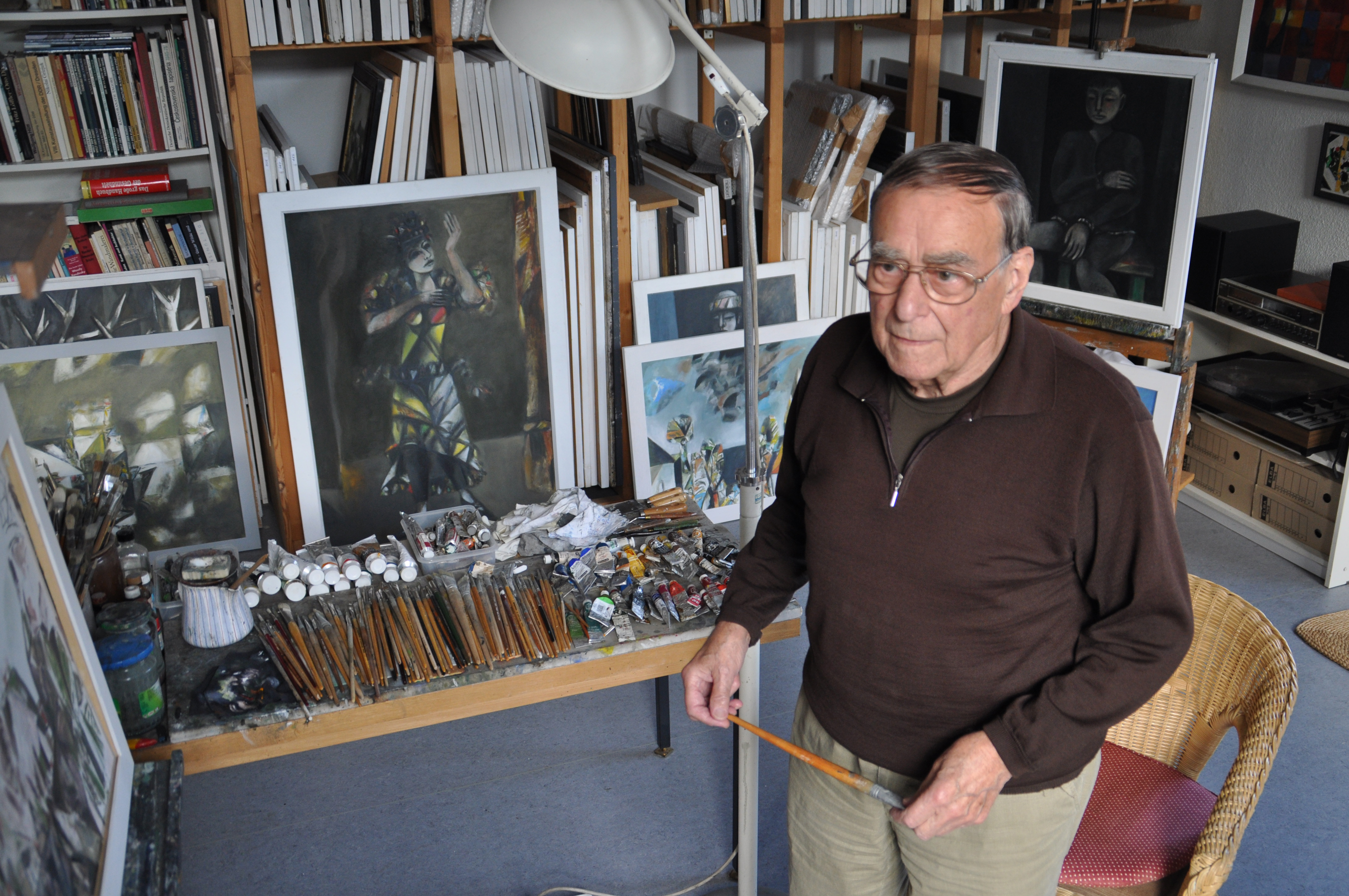
- Rataiczyk in 2010
- Born: 23 June 1921; Eisleben, Saxony, Prussia, Germany
- Died: 3 January 2021 (aged 99); Halle, Saxony-Anhalt, Germany
- Occupation: Painter

Werner Rataiczyk (23 June 1921 – 3 January 2021) was a German painter.

== Biography ==
After an apprenticeship as a graphic designer and illustrator, Rataiczyk fought for Nazi Germany in North Africa and Italy. After World War II, he was a British prisoner of war until 1947 when he began studying at the Burg Giebichenstein School of Art and Design. After graduation, he joined the Verband Bildender Künstler der DDR.

In the 1950s, Rataiczyk began the practice of abstract art, which went along with the culture of East Germany. In 1952, he married the artist Rosemarie Rataiczyk, with whom he had two children, Matthias and Marcella. In the 1960s and 70s, he worked on lithography, starting his own lithographic workshop. He also designed stained glass windows for Catholic and Protestant churches, as well as secular buildings.

Werner Rataiczyk died in Halle on 3 January 2021 at the age of 99.
