= Martin Luther's Death House =

Museum, house in which Martin Luther died

UNESCO World Heritage Site
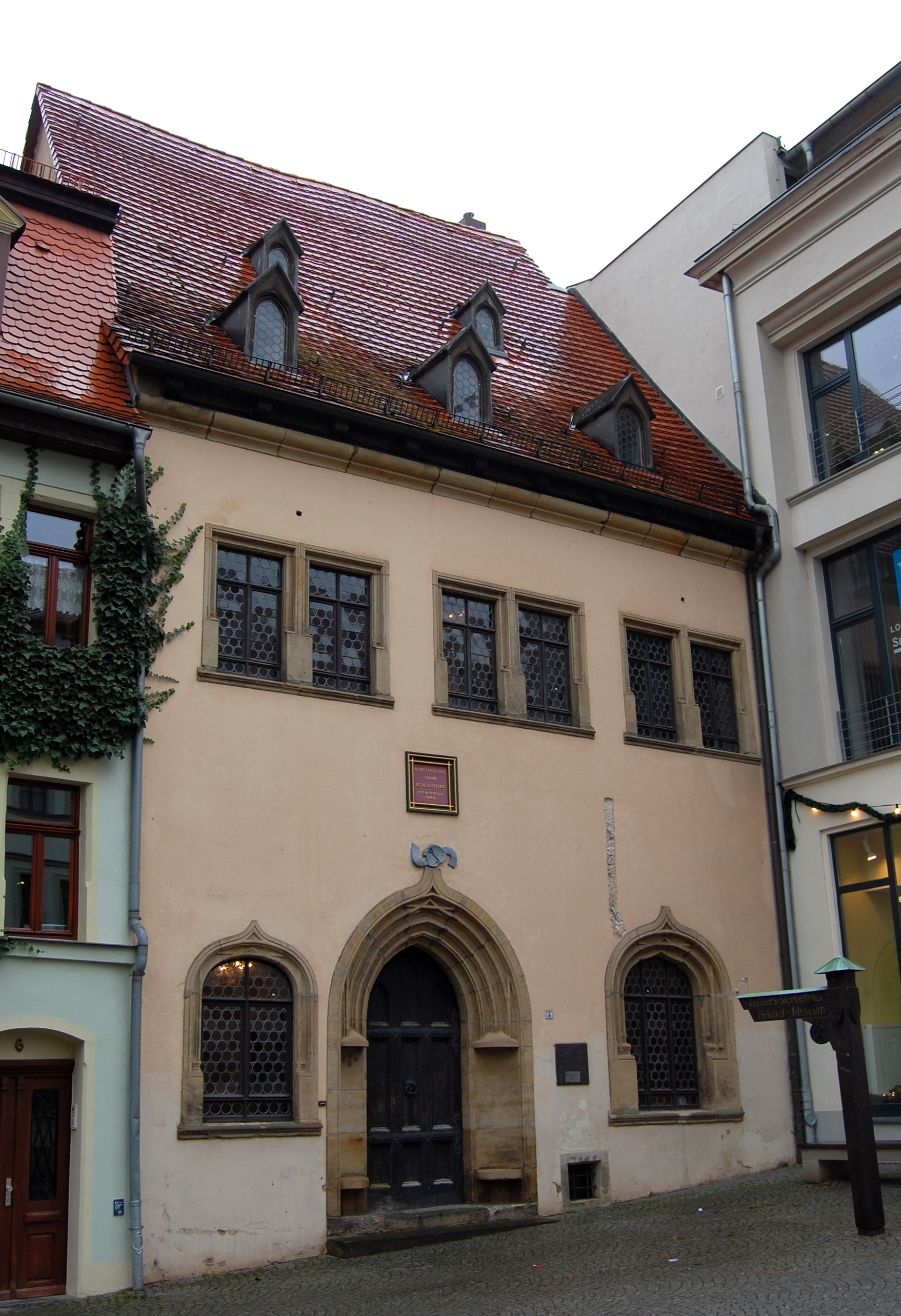
- The house where it was thought that Martin Luther died

- Location within Germany Location within Saxony-Anhalt
- Official name: Luther's Death House
- Location: Eisleben, Mansfeld-Südharz, Sachsen-Anhalt, Germany
- Part of: Luther Memorials in Eisleben and Wittenberg
- Criteria: Cultural: (iv)(vi)
- Reference: 783-001
- Inscription: 1996 (20th Session)
- Area: 0.12 ha (0.30 acres)
- Buffer zone: 1.37 ha (3.4 acres)
- Coordinates: 51°31′41″N 11°32′40″E

Martin Luther's Death House (German: Martin Luthers Sterbehaus) is a historic building in Eisleben, Saxony-Anhalt Germany, long regarded as the place where the influential theologian Martin Luther died on 18 February 1546. Along with Martin Luther's Birth House in Eisleben and other sites associated with Martin Luther in Wittenberg, the building was inscribed on the UNESCO World Heritage List in 1996. It is now a museum.

== History ==
Luther travelled on 23 January 1546 from Halle to Eisleben on a mission to solve an inheritance dispute in the House of Mansfeld. This mediation was protracted and in the meantime Luther was tormented by cramps in his chest. Luther anticipated his death many days beforehand because he was increasingly suffering many heart attacks. By 17 February 1546 the inheritance dispute had finally been resolved and at dinner that day Luther commented he would finally lie down to sleep in his coffin and allow the worms to have a good meal. The pain in his chest continued to worsen and many medications were tried on him, but to no avail. It was claimed that in his last hours more than twenty people were with him, including his son, Paul Luther. The theologian Justus Jonas documented the version of his death accepted by Luther's followers. According to this version, Luther recited prayers, begged the Lord to take his soul and then his senses faded. On 18 February, Luther died at the age of 62 years. The reason for his death is assumed to be a cardiac infarct.

The question of how Martin Luther died became essential to the fate of the Protestant Reformation. The Roman Catholic church preached that the manner of death attests the life and that the devil uses the last moments of life as his last chance to tempt the individual. Immediately after Luther's death, Catholic pamphlets spread rapidly, alleging that Luther had drunk himself to death with alcohol. Sixty years after Luther's death, Catholic polemicist Henrici Seduli asserted in his Præscrptiones Adversus Hæreses that Luther had hanged himself, citing the alleged testimony of one of the theologian's supposed retainers, Ambrosio Kudtfeld. The site of Luther's last rest became a place of worship for the faithful of the Protestant religion and they went on pilgrimages to the house until this was banned in 1707.

== Restoration and reopening ==
The building was reopened in February 2013 after two years of major restoration and extension of the museum costing 5.8 million euros. A new exhibition, Luthers letzter Weg (in English: Luther's last path), chronicles his decease and reveals Luther's attitude to death. It is now possible for visitors to explore all chambers of the building. The new exhibition contains about 110 exhibits, including historic furniture, documents, and signatures, as well as the original cloth that covered Luther's coffin.

In 2013 it also became clear that the chronicler Eusibius Francke had confused, in 1726, the site of the houses of Barthel Drachstedt and of his father Dr. Philipp Drachstedt. The consequence of this mistake was that in 1862 the town of Eisleben took over the wrong house. In 1892, the house was almost completely rebuilt in order to reflect what was believed to be its appearance at the time of Luther's death, even down to a reconstruction of the supposed room of his death.

It is now known that in fact Luther died in a house at Am Markt 56. That site is currently occupied by the Hotel Graf Mansfeld.

== Museum ==
From November through March the museum is open every day except Monday from 10am to 5pm. From April through October the museum is open every day of the week from 10am to 6pm.

== See also ==
- Martin Luther's Birth House
