= Lutherstadt =

Title of German cities associated with Martin Luther

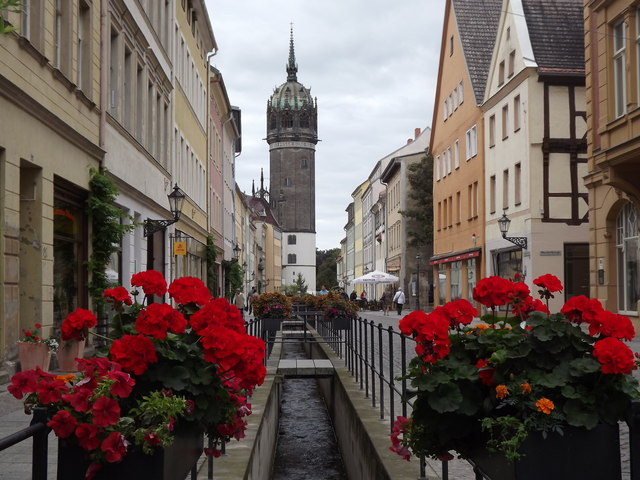
Wittenberg was the centre of Luther's activities

A Lutherstadt (German pronunciation: [ˈluːtɐʃtat], lit. 'Luther city' or 'Luther town'; plural Lutherstädte) is a city German protestant reformer Martin Luther visited or played an important role in. Two cities, Lutherstadt Eisleben and Lutherstadt Wittenberg, have "Lutherstadt" in their official names, while Mansfeld-Lutherstadt is the unofficial name of a district in Mansfeld. These three places which were important in Luther's life were awarded the "European Heritage Label".

== Union of Lutherstädte ==
The Union of Lutherstädte was founded in 1993 on the 125th anniversary of the Luther Monument in Worms, Germany. It is formed by 16 towns where Luther and his teaching played a major role.:

- Augsburg: Luther met papal legate Thomas Cajetan in 1518. Two sessions of the Imperial Diet for the Augsburg Confession took place in 1530. The peace of Augsburg was concluded there in 1555.
- Coburg: Luther remained there during the negotiations for the Augsburg Confession.
- Eisenach: Luther's mother Margarethe, born Lindemann, came from Eisenach, where she met Luther's father Hans, who came from the village of Möhra, 15 kilometres south of Eisenach. Luther therefore lived with relatives in Eisenach between 1498 and 1501 to attend the Latin school St Georgen and the Franciscan monastery of St Paul. From May 1521, Luther lived incognito as Junker Jörg at the Wartburg for 10 months. During this time, he translated the New Testament into German.
- Eisleben: place of birth and death of Luther.
- Erfurt: Luther studied at the University of Erfurt from 1501 to 1505, then had a religious conversion before entering St. Augustine's Friary.
- Halle: Luther visited Halle many times. He travelled from Halle to Mansfeld with Justus Jonas. His body lays in repose there.
- Heidelberg: Luther explained his theology in front of a congregation of Augustinian Friars.
- Magdeburg: Luther attended the Catholic school in this city.
- Marburg: Luther and Ulrich Zwingli meet at the Marburg Colloquy.
- Nordhausen: the first city to adopt the reformation doctrine by its municipal council in 1524.
- Schmalkalden: Luther participated in the negotiations for the Schmalkaldic League.
- Speyer: Protestation at Speyer against an imperial ban against Luther in 1529.
- Torgau: Luther was often in Torgau, since it was the seat of his prince-electors Johann the Steadfast and John Frederick I of Saxony. In 1544, Luther inaugurated the church of Schloss Hartenfels Castle as the first newly built Protestant church. In addition, his wife Katharina von Bora died there in 1552.
- Wittenberg: The centre of Luther's activities. There he publicised the Ninety-five Theses and burned the canon law and the papal bull Exsurge Domine. It is also where Luther wrote the Luther Bible, his Large Catechism, Small Catechism and other documents.
- Worms: Luther defended his theses in front of the Diet of Worms in 1521.
- Zeitz: Luther was from time to time in Zeitz, notably during the consecration of his friend Nikolaus von Amsdorf as the first Protestant bishop. Zeitz is the seat of the Union of the descendants of Luther.

== Das unerschrockene Wort Prize ==
In memory of the work of Martin Luther, the 16 member cities of the Union of Lutherstädte have awarded the Das unerschrockene Wort ("The intrepid word") Prize (€10,000) every two years since 1996. The prize is awarded to persons "who, in words and in deed and against resistance, have made important statements in a situation or for a particular occasion towards the municipality or the state". Winners can be Germans or foreigners.

The prize was awarded for the first time in Worms in 1996 and since 1999 it is awarded every two years. The winners were:

- 1996: Richard Schröder, theologian and philosopher, for his unwavering position during the GDR era. Prize awarded in Worms.
- 1999: Hans Küng, theologian: awarded in Eisenach for the firmness with which he represented his theses on the Catholic doctrine of the faith.
- 2001: Uta Leichsenring: Police President of Eberswalde; Awarded in Erfurt for her courageous behaviour against right-wing extremism and xenophobic attacks.
- 2003: Gertraud Knoll : Austrian pastor and politician; Awarded in Magdeburg for her commitment against racism.
- 2005: Stephan Krawczkyk : Singer and author; awarded in Halle for his performances in churches, despite censorship by the SED communist regime.
- 2007: Emel Zeynelabidin: awarded in Speyer for her decision of not wearing a headscarf as a Muslim.
- 2009: Andrea Röpke: journalist and political scientist; awarded in Zeitz for her research on right-wing groups and subsequent fight against right-wing violence.
- 2011: Dmitri Muratow and Novaya Gazeta : awarded in Heidelberg, for their efforts against corruption and violations against human rights and for their attachment to the freedom of speech and of the press in Russia.
- 2013 : Keine Bedienung für Nazis : Initiative of a few hotel owners in Regensburg of not providing service for racists at their institutions. Pussy Riot was controversially nominated for this price. Awarded in April 2013 in Eisleben.
- 2015: Mazen Darwish, Syrian lawyer and journalist; and the Syrian Centre for Media and Freedom of Expression, awarded in Wittenberg.
- 2017: Markus Nierth, former honorary mayor of Tröglitz, and his wife Susanne Nierth as well as anti-Nazi couple Horst and Birgit Lohmeyer, awarded in Torgau for their action against right-wing extremism.
