= Friesenfeld =

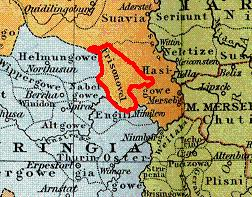
Friesenfeld and surroundings around 1000 A.D.

The Friesenfeld was a Gau (territory), in modern-day north Thuringia and south Saxony-Anhalt in the area between Allstedt and Merseburg and which bordered Hassegau. Numerous places in Friesenfeld such as Erdeborn were named in the Hersfeld Tithe Register of the Hersfeld Abbey as being obliged to pay tithes.

The territory was named after Frisians who settled the area as colonists.

== Literature ==
- August von Wersebe: Beschreibung der Gaue zwischen Elbe, Saale und Unstrut, Weser und Werra: Mit einer Karte, 1829, S. 96 ff Digitalisat
- Georg Landau: Beiträge zur Beschreibung der Gaue Frisenfeld und Hassegau, In: Allgemeines Archiv für die Geschichtskunde des preussischen Staates, Band 12, 1833 Digitalisat
- Hermann Größler: Der gemeinsame Umfang der Gaue Friesenfeld und Hassegau, in: Zeitschrift des Harzvereins VI (1873)
- Allgemeines Archiv für die Geschichtskunde des preussischen Staates, Band 3, S.44f

== Seh also ==
- Hersfeld Tithe Register
