= Seeburg, Saxony-Anhalt =

Seeburg
- Ortsteil of Seegebiet Mansfelder Land
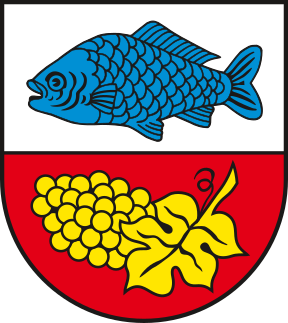
- Coat of arms
- Interactive map of Seeburg
- Location within Germany Location within Saxony-Anhalt
- Coordinates: 51°29′N 11°42′E
- Country: Germany
- State: Saxony-Anhalt
- District: Mansfeld-Südharz
- Municipality: Seegebiet Mansfelder Land

Area
  - Total: 14.84 km^{2} (5.73 sq mi)
- Elevation: 90 m (300 ft)

Population (2006-12-31)
  - Total: 590
  - Density: 40/km^{2} (100/sq mi)
- Time zone: UTC+01:00 (CET)
  - Summer (DST): UTC+02:00 (CEST)
- Postal codes: 06317
- Dialling codes: 034774
- Website: www.seegebiet-mansfelder-land.de

Seeburg (German pronunciation: [ˈzeːbʊʁk]) is a village and a former municipality in the Mansfeld-Südharz district, Saxony-Anhalt, Germany.

Since 1 January 2010, it is part of the municipality Seegebiet Mansfelder Land. The village of Rollsdorf is nearby, on the Bindersee lake.

== Gallery ==
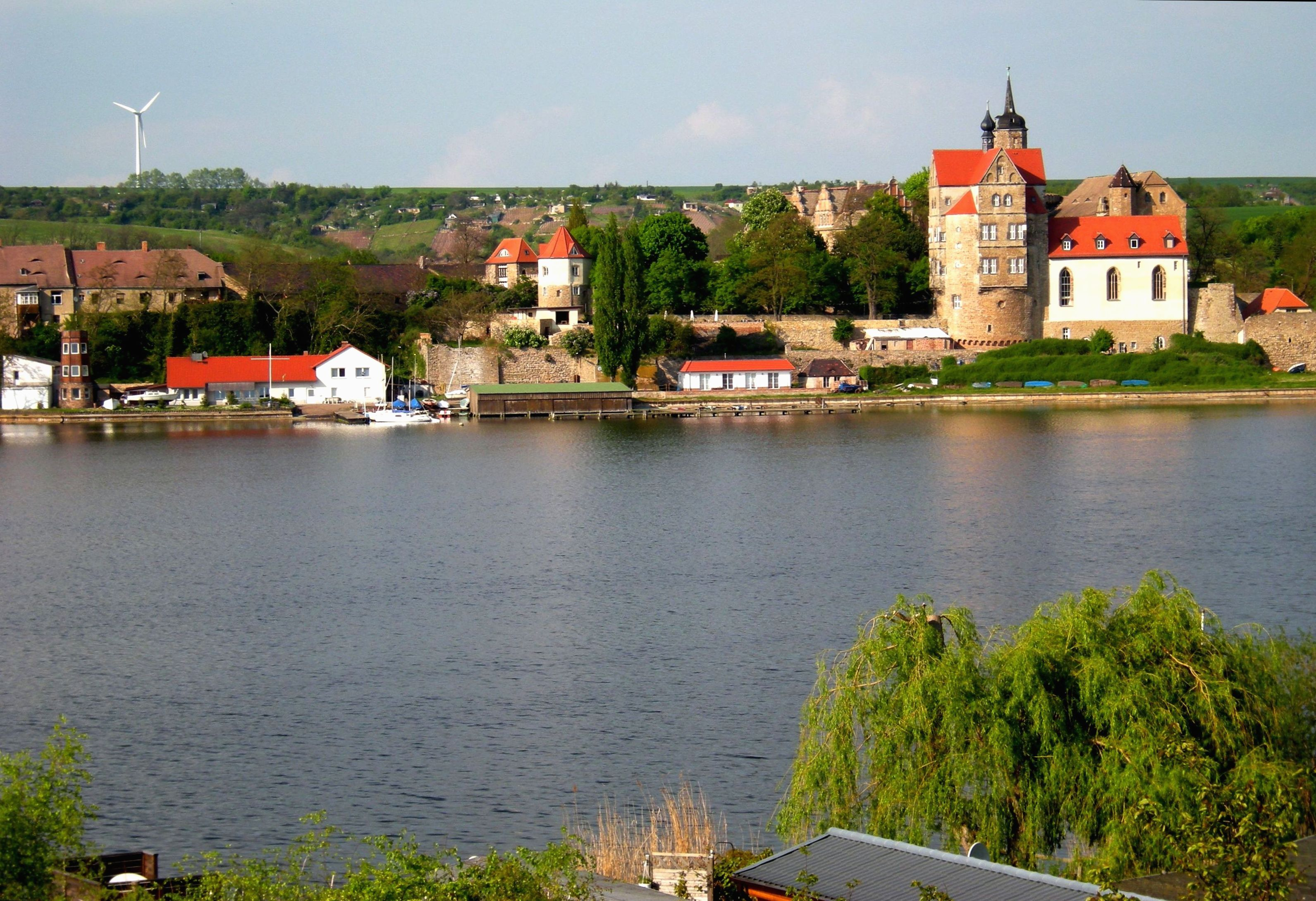
Panorama of Seeburg

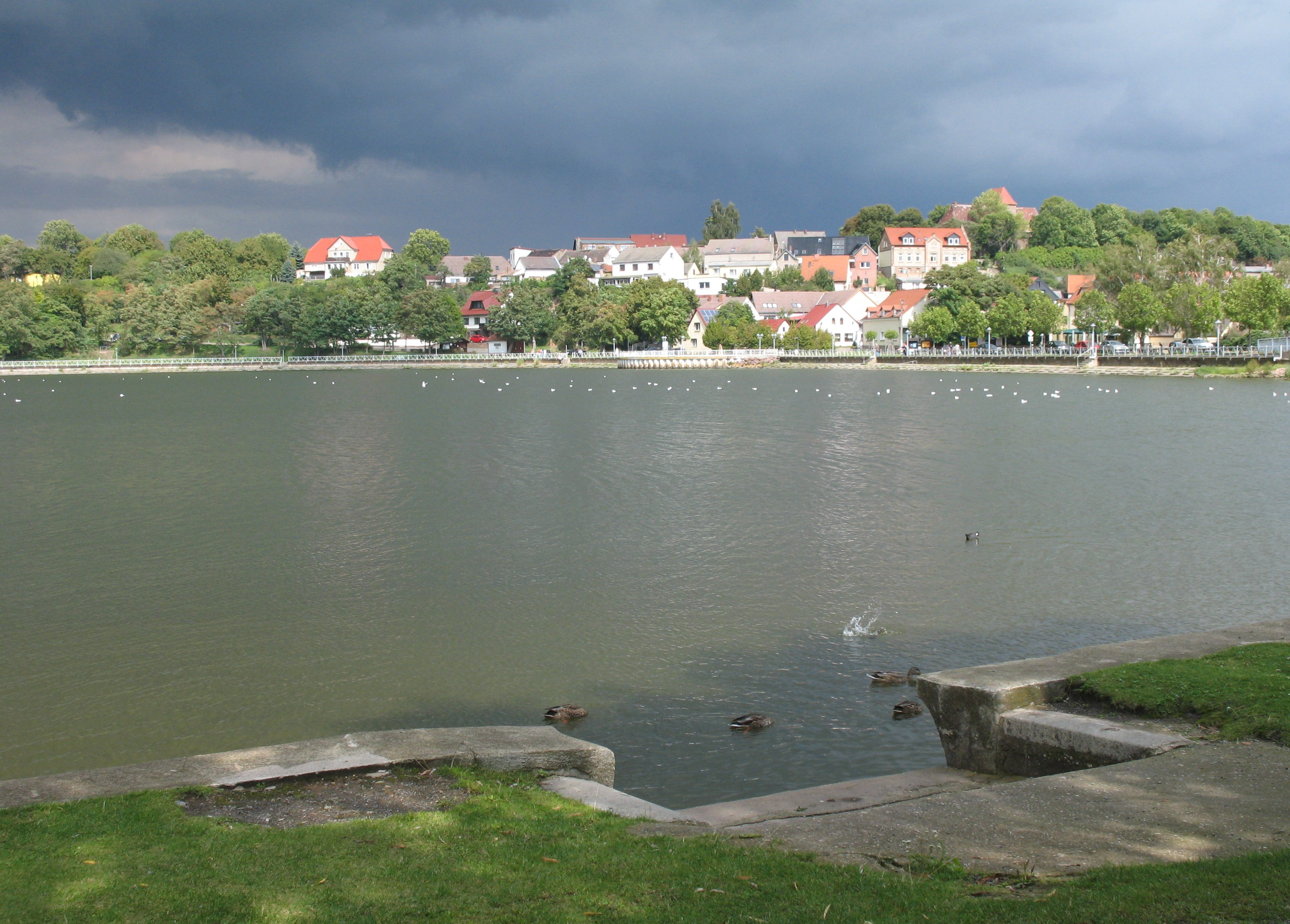
Seeburg

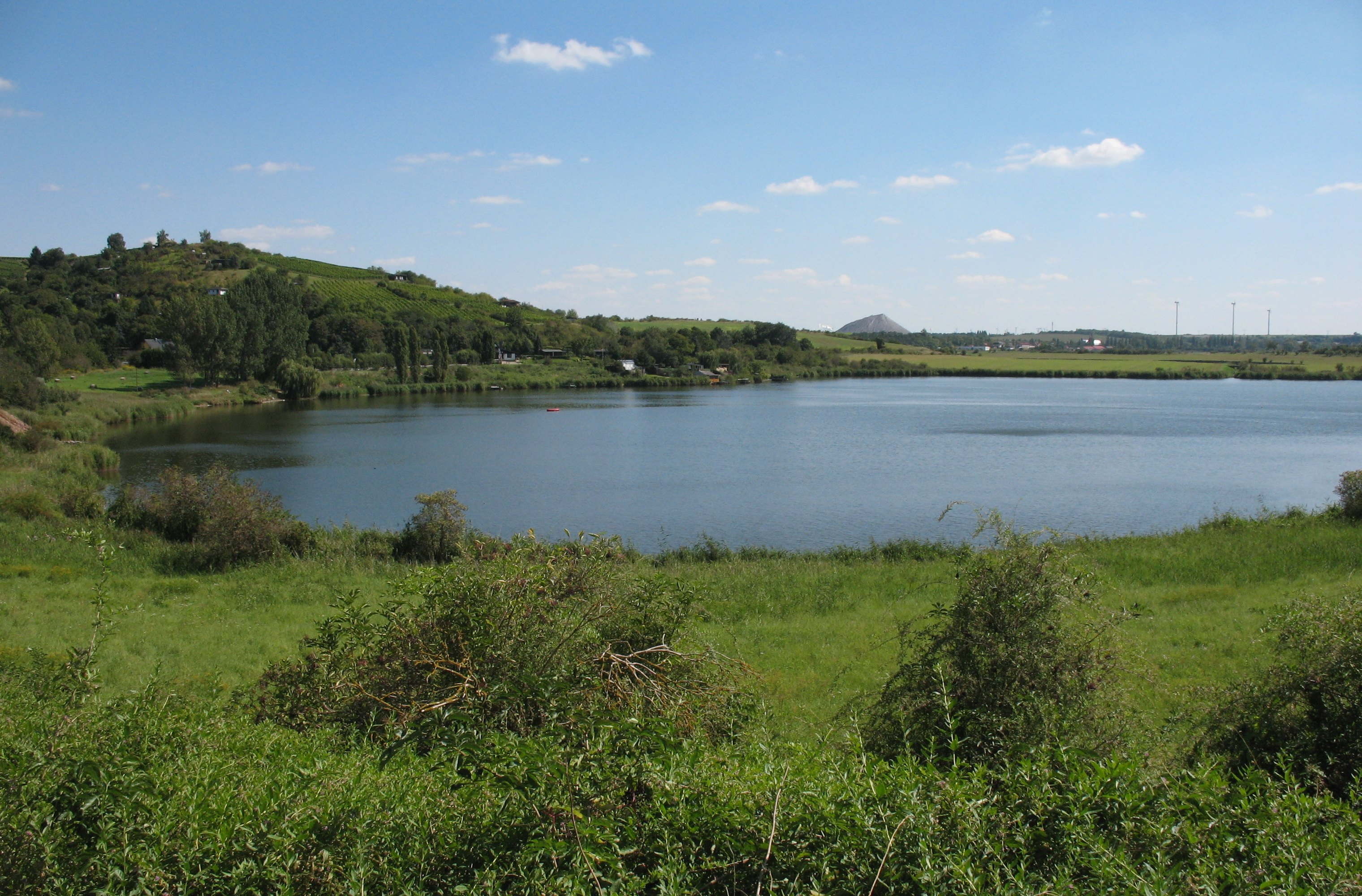
Bindersee, a lake in Seeburg-Rollsdorf

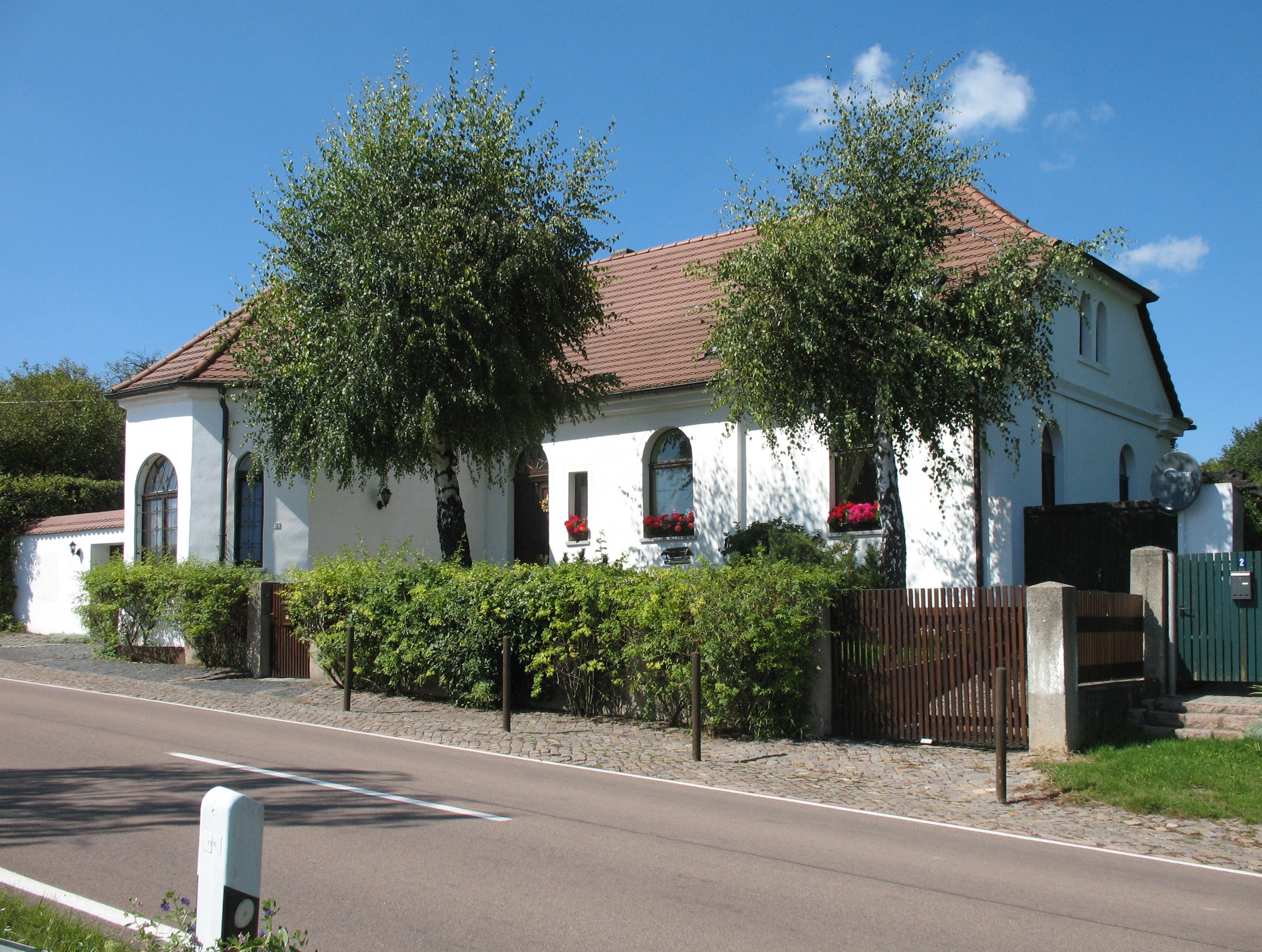
Former toll house in Seeburg-Rollsdorf

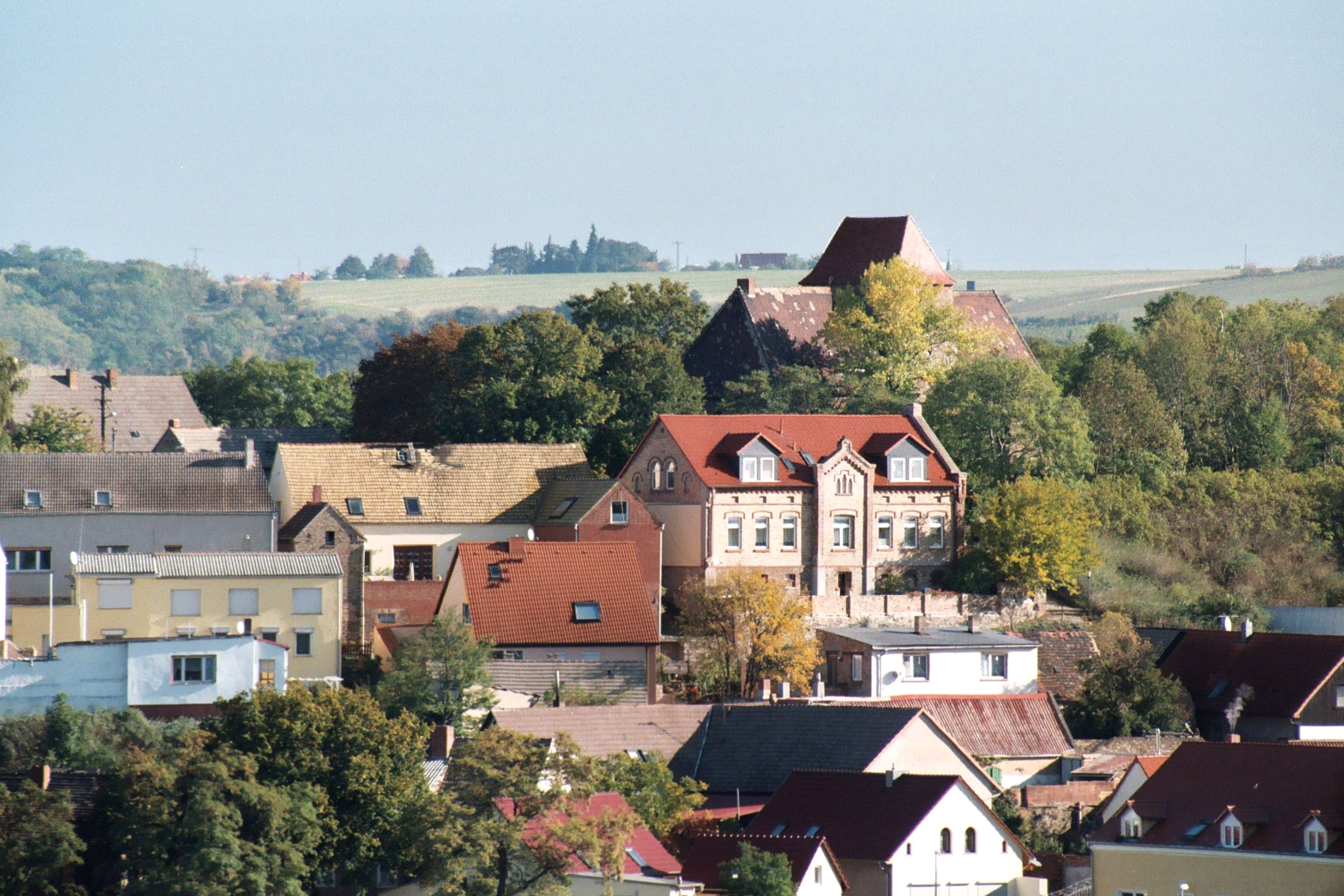
View to the village church with telephoto lens
