= Kunisch =

Kunisch is a German surname. Notable people with the surname include:

- Georg Kunisch (1893–1936), German swimmer
- Helmut Kunisch (1936–2021), Swiss long-distance runner
- Johannes Kunisch (1937–2015), German historian
- Karl Kunisch (born 1952), Austrian mathematician
- Kornelia Kunisch (born 1959), East German handball player
