= Dederstedt =

- Ortsteil of Seegebiet Mansfelder Land
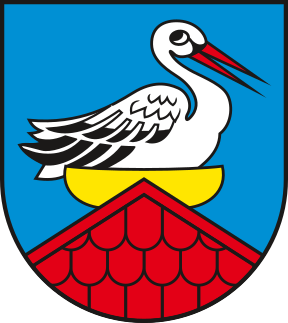
- Coat of arms
- Interactive map of Dederstedt
- Location within Germany Location within Saxony-Anhalt
- Coordinates: 51°33′N 11°41′E
- Country: Germany
- State: Saxony-Anhalt
- District: Mansfeld-Südharz
- Municipality: Seegebiet Mansfelder Land

Area
  - Total: 8.67 km^{2} (3.35 sq mi)
- Elevation: 177 m (581 ft)

Population (2009-12-31)
  - Total: 425
  - Density: 49.0/km^{2} (127/sq mi)
- Time zone: UTC+01:00 (CET)
  - Summer (DST): UTC+02:00 (CEST)
- Postal codes: 06295
- Dialling codes: 034773
- Vehicle registration: MSH

Dederstedt is a village and a former municipality in the Mansfeld-Südharz district, Saxony-Anhalt, Germany.

On 1 September 2010, it became part of the municipality Seegebiet Mansfelder Land.
