= Hedersleben, Mansfeld-Südharz =

Hedersleben
- Stadtteil of Eisleben
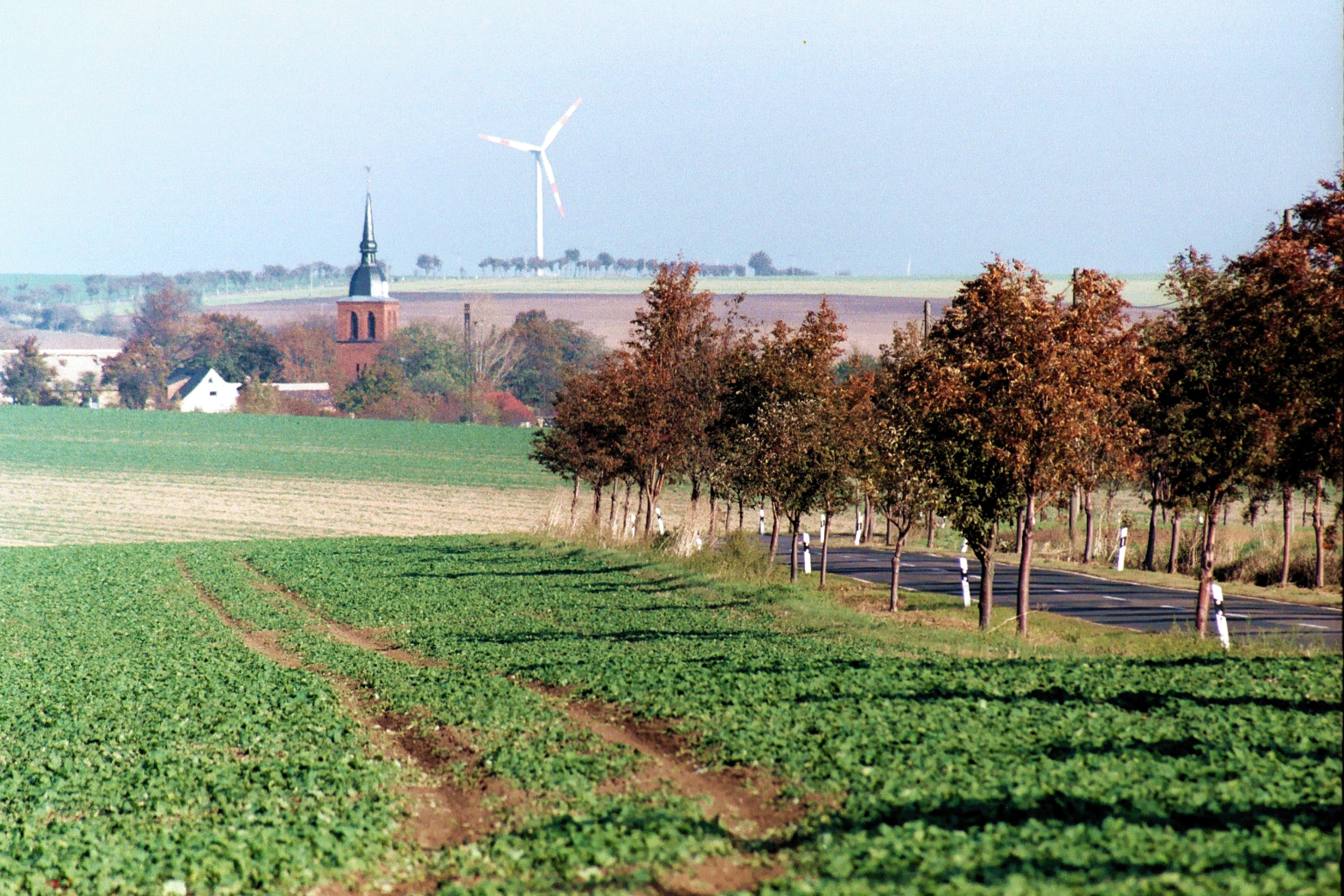
- View towards Hedersleben

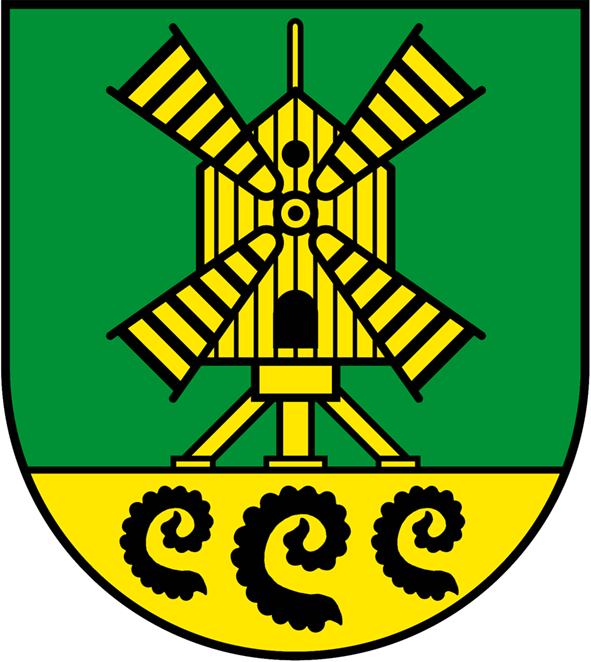
- Coat of arms
- Interactive map of Hedersleben
- Location within Germany Location within Saxony-Anhalt
- Coordinates: 51°33′N 11°39′E
- Country: Germany
- State: Saxony-Anhalt
- District: Mansfeld-Südharz
- Town: Eisleben

Area
  - Total: 20.05 km^{2} (7.74 sq mi)
- Elevation: 170 m (560 ft)

Population (2006-12-31)
  - Total: 990
  - Density: 49/km^{2} (130/sq mi)
- Time zone: UTC+01:00 (CET)
  - Summer (DST): UTC+02:00 (CEST)
- Postal codes: 06295
- Dialling codes: 034773
- Website: www.hedersleben-online.de

Hedersleben is a village and a former municipality in the Mansfeld-Südharz district, Saxony-Anhalt, Germany.

Since 1 January 2010, it is part of the town Eisleben.
