= Aseleben =

- Ortsteil of Seegebiet Mansfelder Land
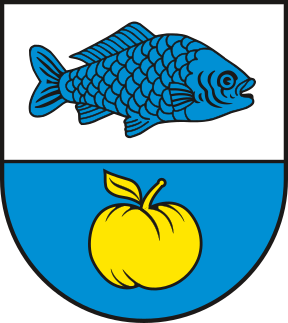
- Coat of arms
- Interactive map of Aseleben
- Location within Germany Location within Saxony-Anhalt
- Coordinates: 51°29′N 11°41′E
- Country: Germany
- State: Saxony-Anhalt
- District: Mansfeld-Südharz
- Municipality: Seegebiet Mansfelder Land

Area
  - Total: 3.82 km^{2} (1.47 sq mi)
- Elevation: 76 m (249 ft)

Population (2006-12-31)
  - Total: 523
  - Density: 137/km^{2} (355/sq mi)
- Time zone: UTC+01:00 (CET)
  - Summer (DST): UTC+02:00 (CEST)
- Postal codes: 06317
- Dialling codes: 034774

Aseleben is a village and a former municipality in the Mansfeld-Südharz district, Saxony-Anhalt, Germany.

Since 1 January 2010, it is part of the municipality Seegebiet Mansfelder Land.
