= Amsdorf =

- Ortsteil of Seegebiet Mansfelder Land
- Coat of arms
- Interactive map of Amsdorf
- Location within Germany Location within Saxony-Anhalt
- Coordinates: 51°27′52″N 11°43′41″E
- Country: Germany
- State: Saxony-Anhalt
- District: Mansfeld-Südharz
- Municipality: Seegebiet Mansfelder Land

Area
  - Total: 5.62 km^{2} (2.17 sq mi)
- Elevation: 94 m (308 ft)

Population (2006-12-31)
  - Total: 531
  - Density: 94.5/km^{2} (245/sq mi)
- Time zone: UTC+01:00 (CET)
  - Summer (DST): UTC+02:00 (CEST)
- Postal codes: 06317
- Dialling codes: 034601
- Vehicle registration: MSH

Amsdorf is a village and a former municipality in the Mansfeld-Südharz district, Saxony-Anhalt, Germany.

Since 1 January 2010, it is part of the municipality Seegebiet Mansfelder Land.
