= Bindersee =

Lake in Germany

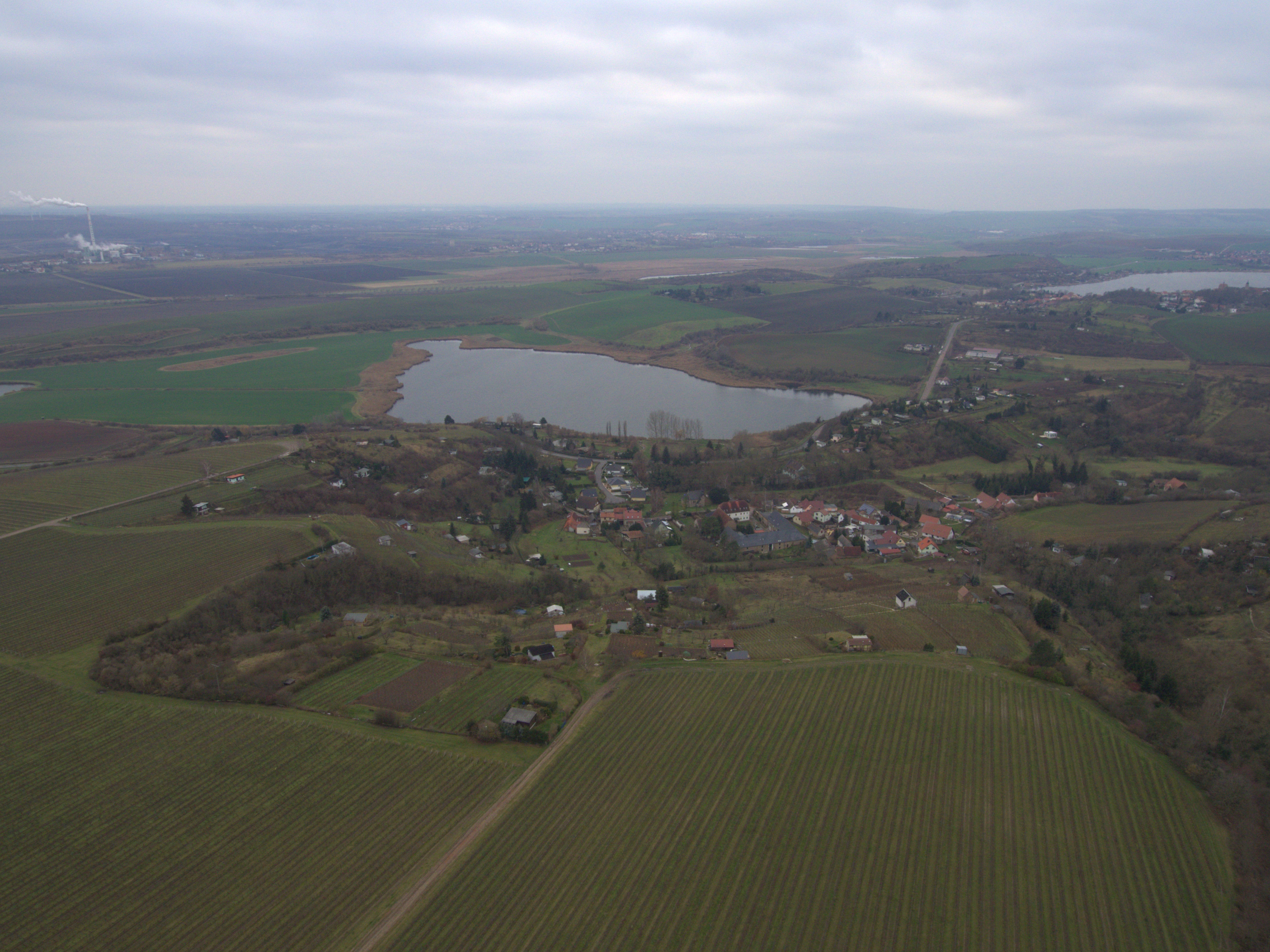
- Aerial view of the Bindersee and the village of Rollsdorf from the northeast; on the right in the background is the "Sweet Lake"

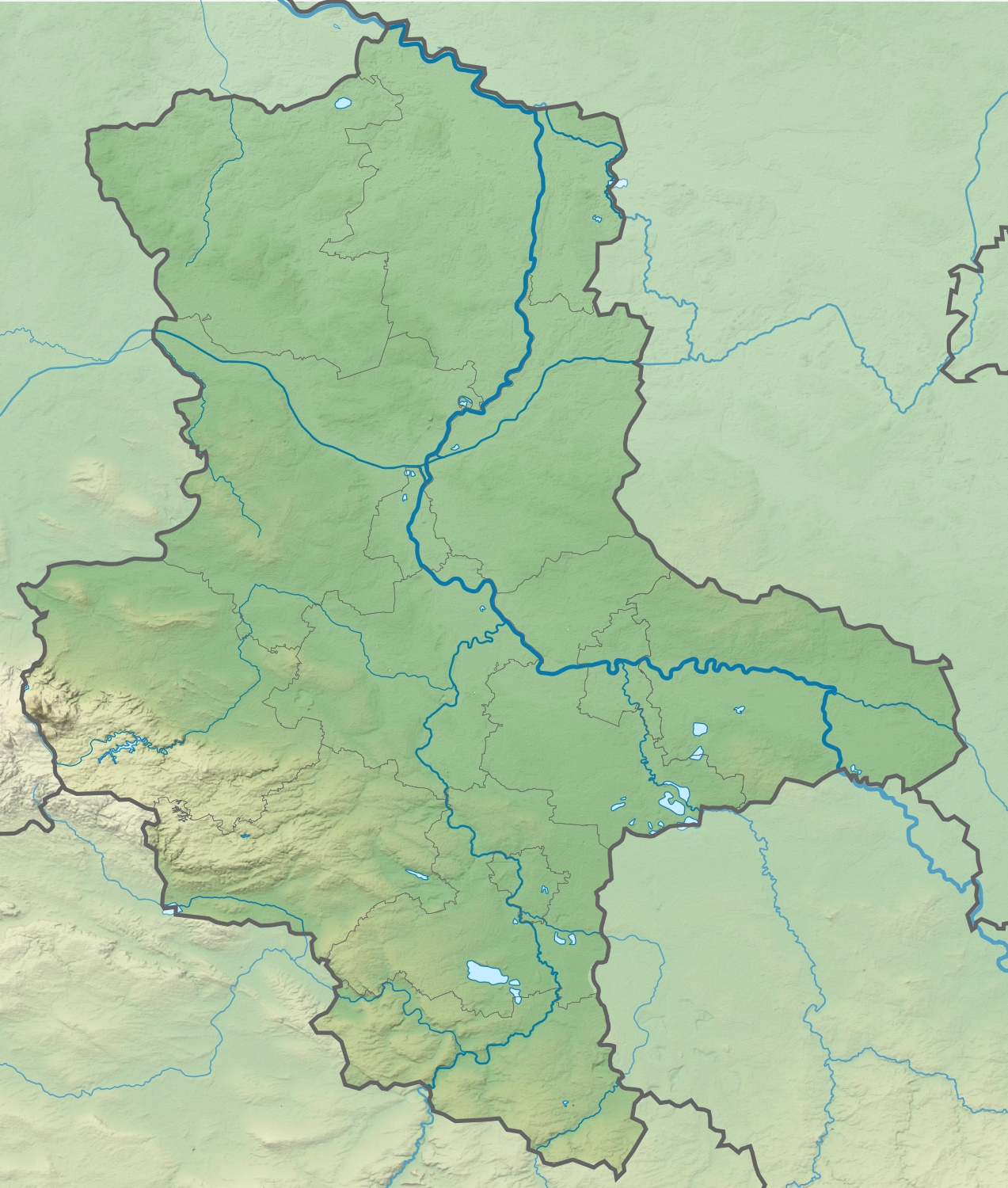
- Location within Saxony-Anhalt
- Location: Rollsdorf, Landkreis Mansfeld-Südharz, Saxony-Anhalt
- Coordinates: 51°29′N 11°44′E
- Basin countries: Germany
- Max. length: 0.75 km (0.47 mi)
- Max. width: 0.4 km (0.25 mi)

Bindersee is a lake near Höhnstedt in Saxony-Anhalt, Germany.

As of 2022, researchers from the University of Bonn were conducting an archaeological excavation at the deepest point in the lake, because its sediment deposits were undisturbed. Their objective was to find information about prehistoric human influence on the development of the landscape in Central Germany.

== Gallery ==
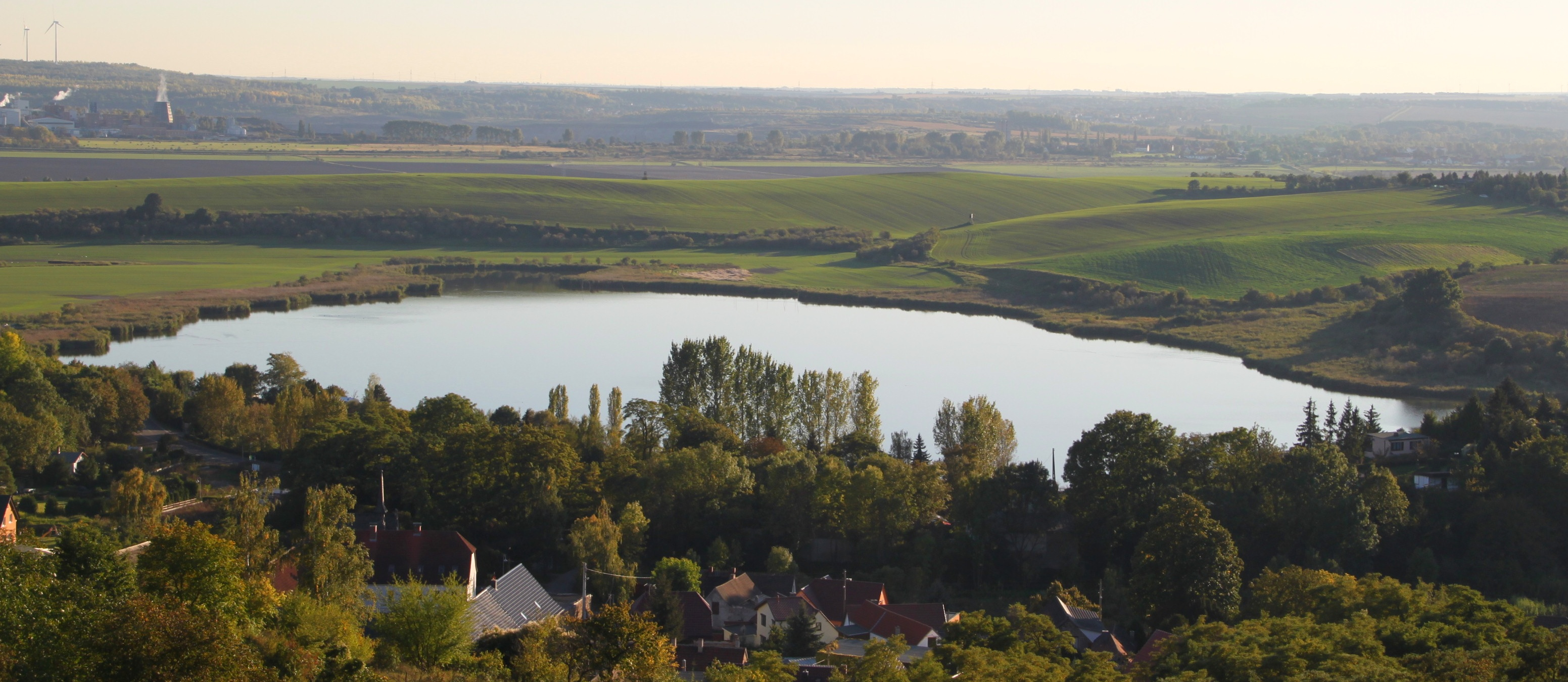
Lake Bindersee near Rollsdorf, Saxony-Anhalt
