= Stedten =

- Ortsteil of Seegebiet Mansfelder Land
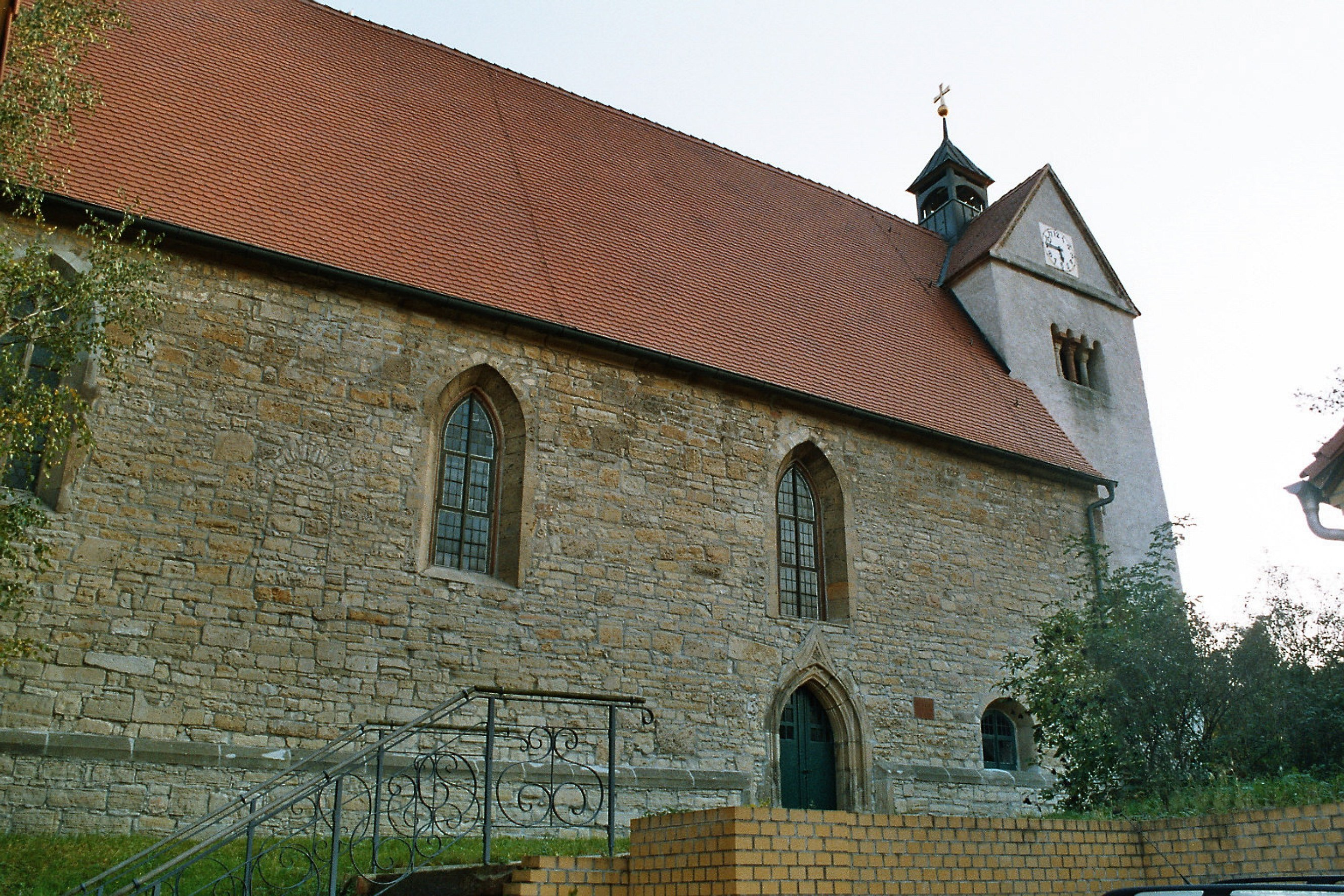
- The village church of Stedten

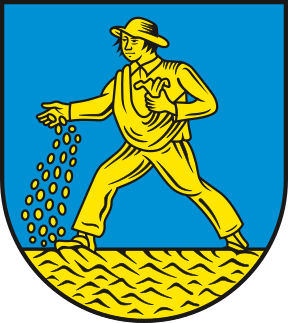
- Coat of arms
- Interactive map of Stedten
- Location within Germany Location within Saxony-Anhalt
- Coordinates: 51°26′N 11°41′E
- Country: Germany
- State: Saxony-Anhalt
- District: Mansfeld-Südharz
- Municipality: Seegebiet Mansfelder Land

Area
  - Total: 9.62 km^{2} (3.71 sq mi)
- Elevation: 148 m (486 ft)

Population (2006-12-31)
  - Total: 1,062
  - Density: 110/km^{2} (286/sq mi)
- Time zone: UTC+01:00 (CET)
  - Summer (DST): UTC+02:00 (CEST)
- Postal codes: 06317
- Dialling codes: 034774
- Vehicle registration: MSH

Stedten is a village and a former municipality in the Mansfeld-Südharz district, Saxony-Anhalt, Germany.

Since 1 January 2010, it is part of the municipality Seegebiet Mansfelder Land.

== History ==
The first documented mention of Stedten was as the tithable place Stedi in the Hersfeld Tithe Register, dating from between 881 and 889.
