= Neehausen =

- Ortsteil of Seegebiet Mansfelder Land
- Interactive map of Neehausen
- Location within Germany Location within Saxony-Anhalt
- Coordinates: 51°32′N 11°42′E
- Country: Germany
- State: Saxony-Anhalt
- District: Mansfeld-Südharz
- Municipality: Seegebiet Mansfelder Land

Area
  - Total: 12.58 km^{2} (4.86 sq mi)
- Elevation: 149 m (489 ft)

Population (2006-12-31)
  - Total: 275
  - Density: 21.9/km^{2} (56.6/sq mi)
- Time zone: UTC+01:00 (CET)
  - Summer (DST): UTC+02:00 (CEST)
- Postal codes: 06295
- Dialling codes: 034773

Neehausen is a village and a former municipality in the Mansfeld-Südharz district, Saxony-Anhalt, Germany.

Since 1 January 2010, it is part of the municipality Seegebiet Mansfelder Land.
