= Burgsdorf =

- Stadtteil of Eisleben
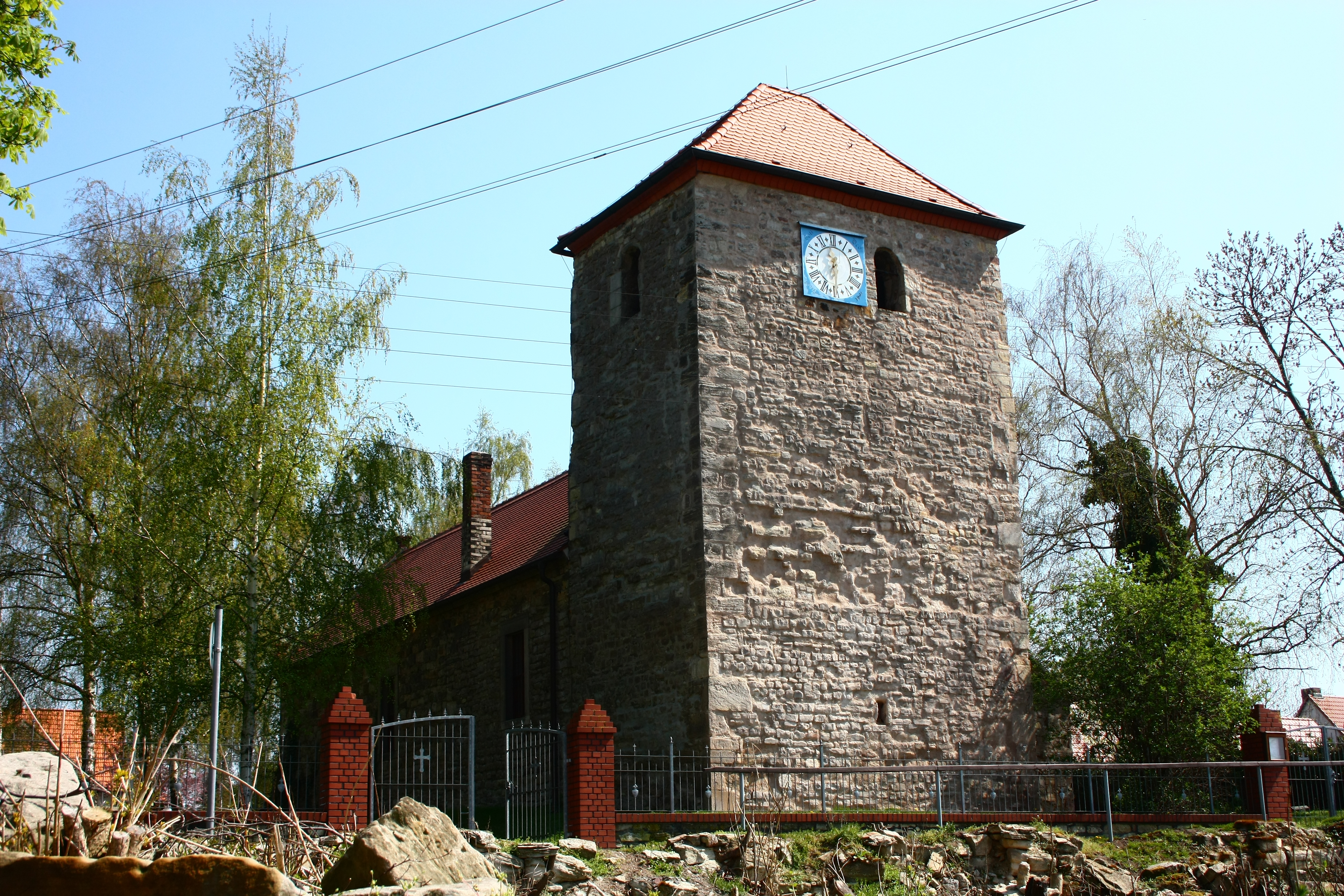
- Village church of St. Andrew

- Location of Burgsdorf in Eisleben
- Interactive map of Burgsdorf
- Location within Germany Location within Saxony-Anhalt
- Coordinates: 51°35′N 11°39′E
- Country: Germany
- State: Saxony-Anhalt
- District: Mansfeld-Südharz
- Town: Eisleben

Area
  - Total: 3.93 km^{2} (1.52 sq mi)
- Elevation: 188 m (617 ft)

Population (2006-12-31)
  - Total: 204
  - Density: 51.9/km^{2} (134/sq mi)
- Time zone: UTC+01:00 (CET)
  - Summer (DST): UTC+02:00 (CEST)
- Postal codes: 06295
- Dialling codes: 034773

Burgsdorf is a village and a former municipality in the Mansfeld-Südharz district, Saxony-Anhalt, Germany.

Since 1 January 2010, it is part of the town Eisleben.

== History ==
The first documented mention of Burgsdorf is as Burcdorpf in the Hersfeld Tithe Register, compiled in the 9th Century.
