= Lüttchendorf =

- Ortsteil of Seegebiet Mansfelder Land
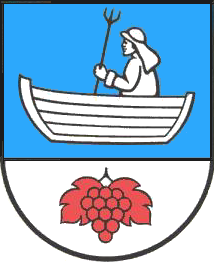
- Coat of arms
- Interactive map of Lüttchendorf
- Location within Germany Location within Saxony-Anhalt
- Coordinates: 51°30′N 11°38′E
- Country: Germany
- State: Saxony-Anhalt
- District: Mansfeld-Südharz
- Municipality: Seegebiet Mansfelder Land

Area
  - Total: 7.84 km^{2} (3.03 sq mi)
- Elevation: 100 m (330 ft)

Population (2006-12-31)
  - Total: 639
  - Density: 81.5/km^{2} (211/sq mi)
- Time zone: UTC+01:00 (CET)
  - Summer (DST): UTC+02:00 (CEST)
- Postal codes: 06317
- Dialling codes: 03475

Lüttchendorf is a village and a former municipality in the Mansfeld-Südharz district, Saxony-Anhalt, Germany.

Since 1 January 2010, it is part of the municipality Seegebiet Mansfelder Land.

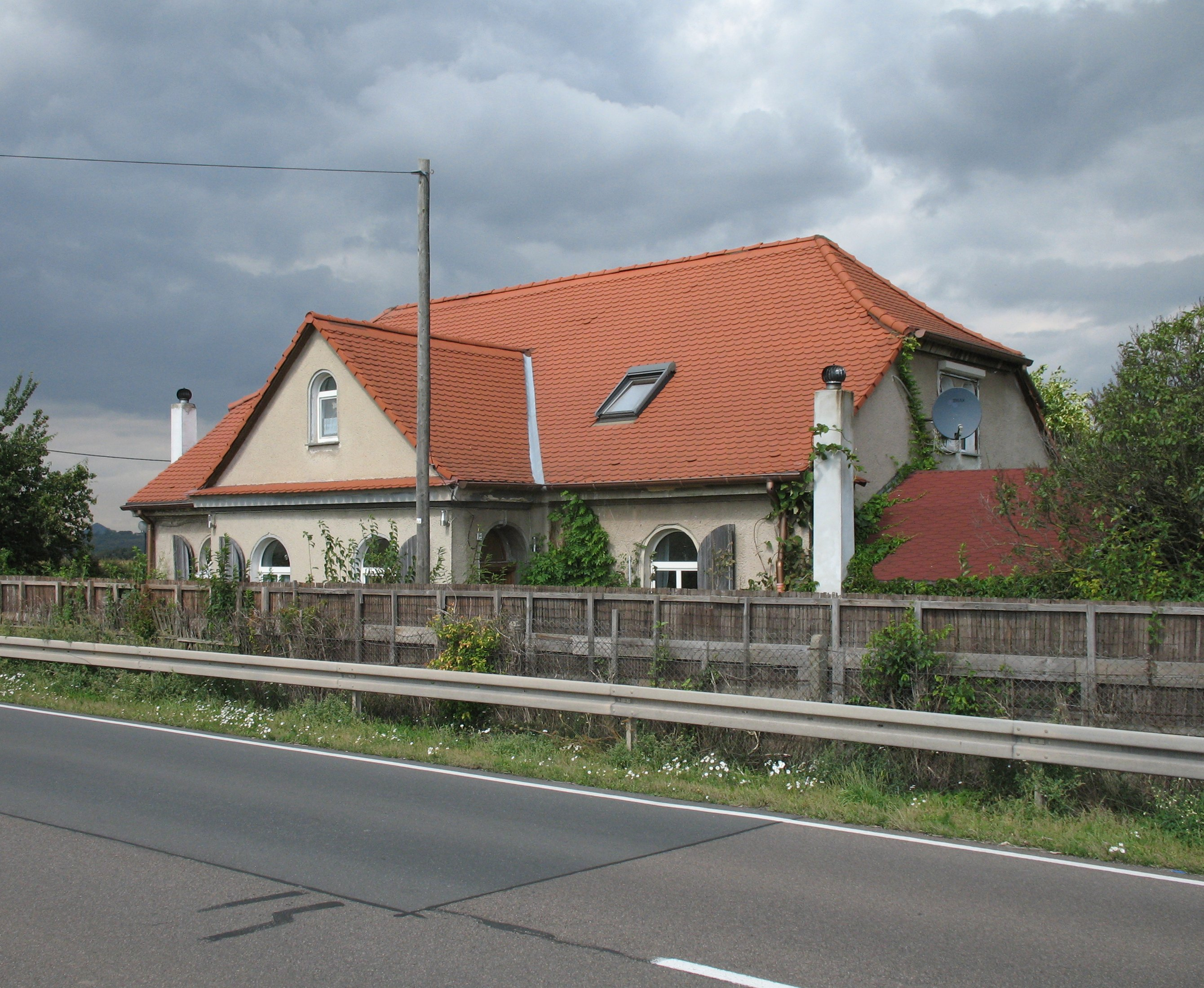
Former toll house

== History ==
The first documented mention of Lüttchendorf was as Luzilendorpf in the Hersfeld Tithe Register from the 880's.

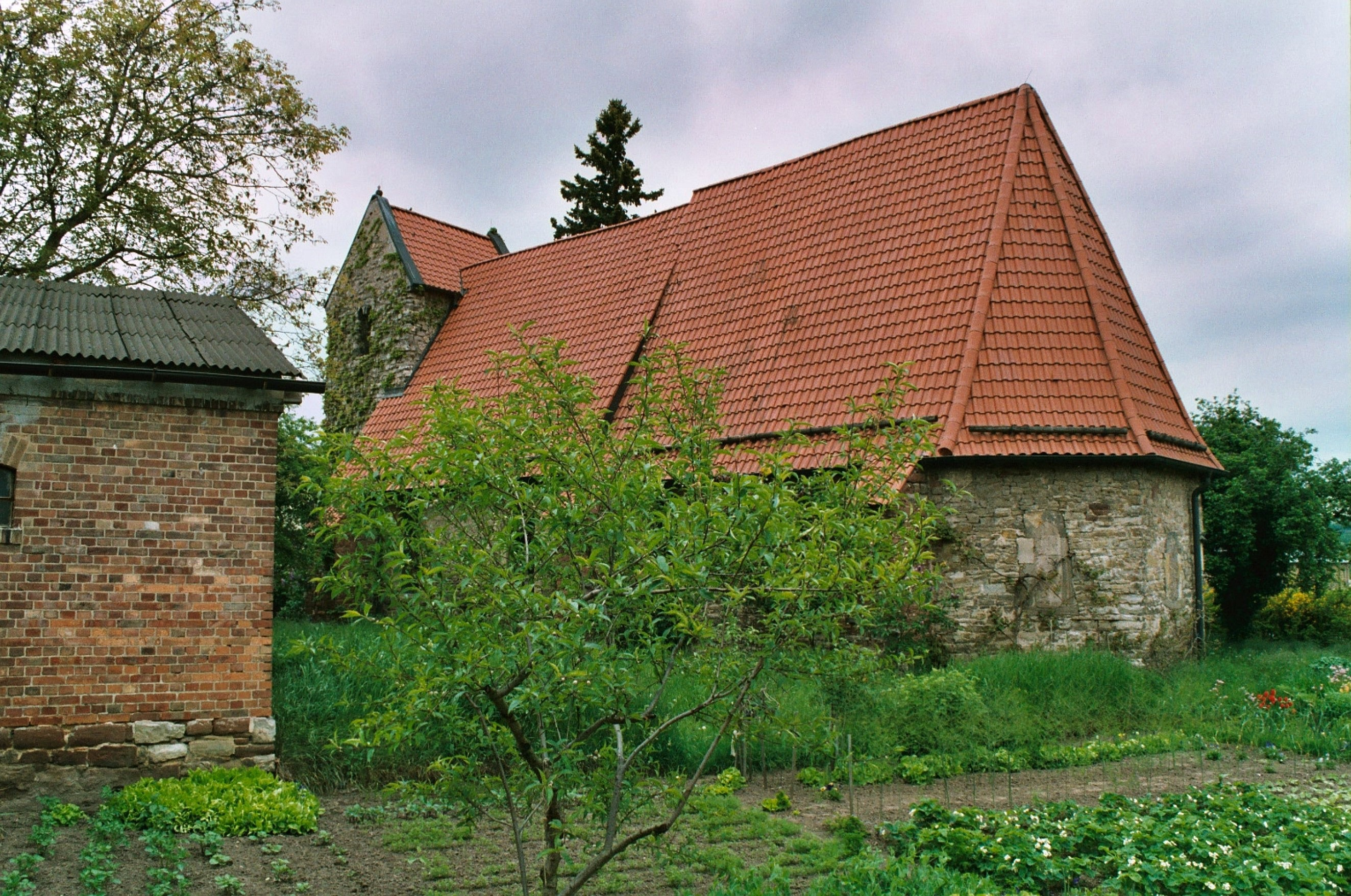
The village church
