= Bischofrode =

- Stadtteil of Eisleben
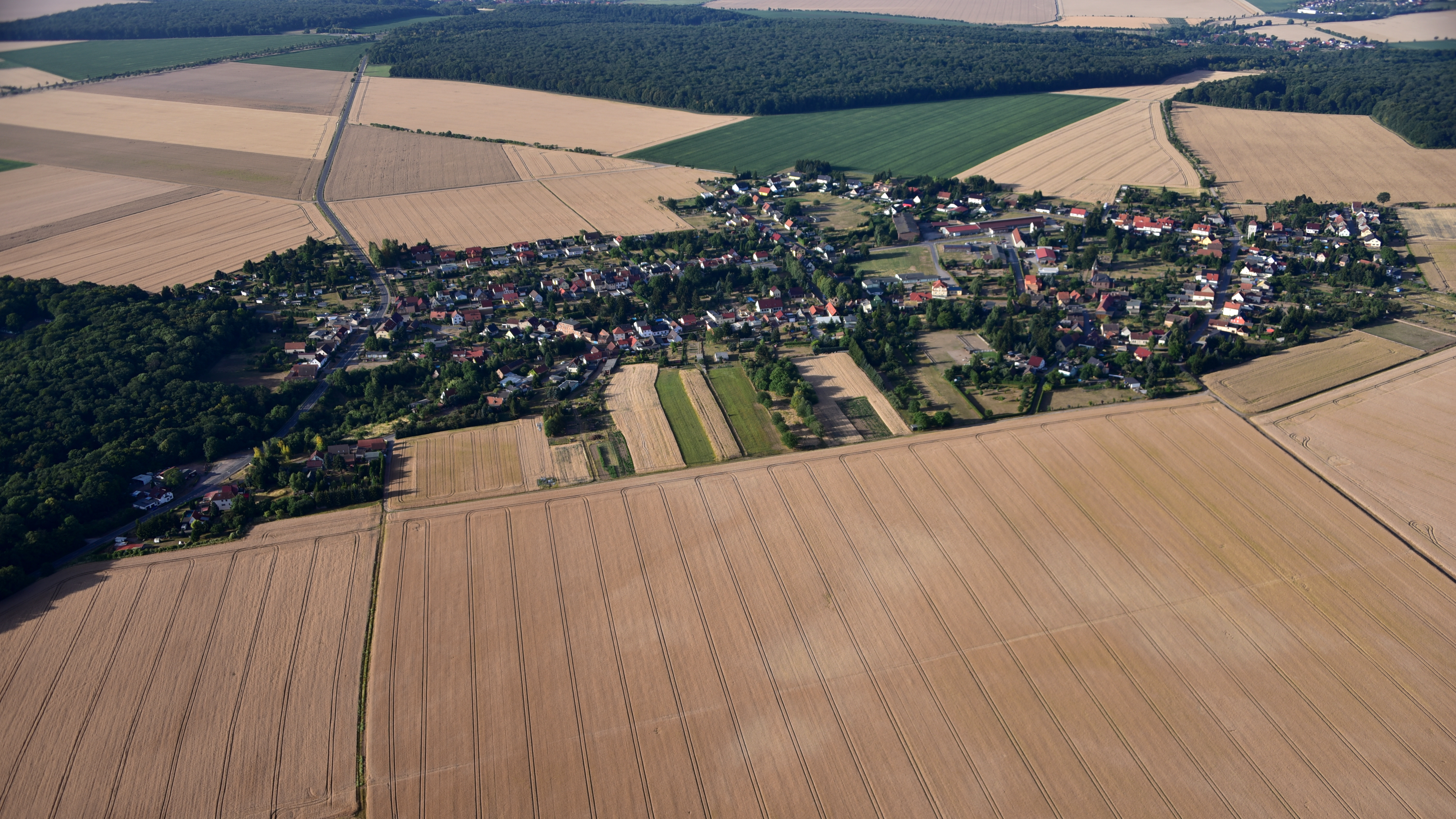
- Aerial view
- Interactive map of Bischofrode
- Location within Germany Location within Saxony-Anhalt
- Coordinates: 51°29′N 11°32′E
- Country: Germany
- State: Saxony-Anhalt
- District: Mansfeld-Südharz
- Town: Eisleben

Area
  - Total: 10.52 km^{2} (4.06 sq mi)
- Elevation: 268 m (879 ft)

Population (2006-12-31)
  - Total: 715
  - Density: 68.0/km^{2} (176/sq mi)
- Time zone: UTC+01:00 (CET)
  - Summer (DST): UTC+02:00 (CEST)
- Postal codes: 06295
- Dialling codes: 03475

Bischofrode is a village and a former municipality in the Mansfeld-Südharz district, in Saxony-Anhalt, Germany. Since 1 January 2009, it is part of the town Eisleben.
