= Wansleben am See =

- Ortsteil of Seegebiet Mansfelder Land
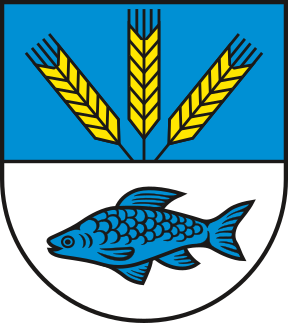
- Coat of arms
- Interactive map of Wansleben am See
- Location within Germany Location within Saxony-Anhalt
- Coordinates: 51°28′N 11°45′E
- Country: Germany
- State: Saxony-Anhalt
- District: Mansfeld-Südharz
- Municipality: Seegebiet Mansfelder Land

Area
  - Total: 7.84 km^{2} (3.03 sq mi)
- Elevation: 110 m (360 ft)

Population (2006-12-31)
  - Total: 1,815
  - Density: 232/km^{2} (600/sq mi)
- Time zone: UTC+01:00 (CET)
  - Summer (DST): UTC+02:00 (CEST)
- Postal codes: 06318
- Dialling codes: 034601
- Website: www.wansleben-am-see.de

Wansleben am See is a village and a former municipality in the Mansfeld-Südharz district, Saxony-Anhalt, Germany.

Since 1 January 2010, it is part of the municipality Seegebiet Mansfelder Land.

== History ==
Wansleben was firstly named in the late 9th century. From 1944 to 1945, about 2000 prisoners of the concentration camp Buchenwald had to produce components for military airplanes in tunnels nearly 400 m below ground. Until the 1960s, a potash mine was operated here.

== Place of interest ==
The late Gothic church Saint Andrew and Stephen (1506) is decorated with mural painting.
