= Hornburg, Saxony-Anhalt =

Hornburg
- Ortsteil of Seegebiet Mansfelder Land
- Interactive map of Hornburg
- Location within Germany Location within Saxony-Anhalt
- Coordinates: 51°27′12″N 11°35′23″E
- Country: Germany
- State: Saxony-Anhalt
- District: Mansfeld-Südharz
- Municipality: Seegebiet Mansfelder Land

Area
  - Total: 11.35 km^{2} (4.38 sq mi)
- Elevation: 206 m (676 ft)

Population (2006-12-31)
  - Total: 384
  - Density: 33.8/km^{2} (87.6/sq mi)
- Time zone: UTC+01:00 (CET)
  - Summer (DST): UTC+02:00 (CEST)
- Postal codes: 06295
- Dialling codes: 034776
- Vehicle registration: MSH

Hornburg (German pronunciation: [ˈhɔʁnˌbʊʁk]) is a village and a former municipality in the Mansfeld-Südharz district, Saxony-Anhalt, Germany.

Since 1 January 2010, it is part of the municipality Seegebiet Mansfelder Land.
