= Erdeborn =

- Ortsteil of Seegebiet Mansfelder Land
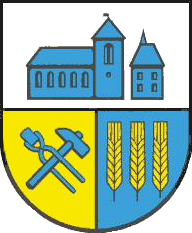
- Coat of arms
- Interactive map of Erdeborn
- Location within Germany Location within Saxony-Anhalt
- Coordinates: 51°29′N 11°38′E
- Country: Germany
- State: Saxony-Anhalt
- District: Mansfeld-Südharz
- Municipality: Seegebiet Mansfelder Land

Area
  - Total: 12.20 km^{2} (4.71 sq mi)
- Elevation: 123 m (404 ft)

Population (2006-12-31)
  - Total: 1,089
  - Density: 89.26/km^{2} (231.2/sq mi)
- Time zone: UTC+01:00 (CET)
  - Summer (DST): UTC+02:00 (CEST)
- Postal codes: 06317
- Dialling codes: 034774
- Website: www.erdeborn.com

Erdeborn is a village and a former municipality in the Mansfeld-Südharz district, Saxony-Anhalt, Germany. Since 1 January 2010, it is part of the municipality Seegebiet Mansfelder Land.

== History ==
The first documented mention of Erdeborn is as Hardabrunno in the Hersfeld Tithe Register of 889.
