= Eisleben =

- Town
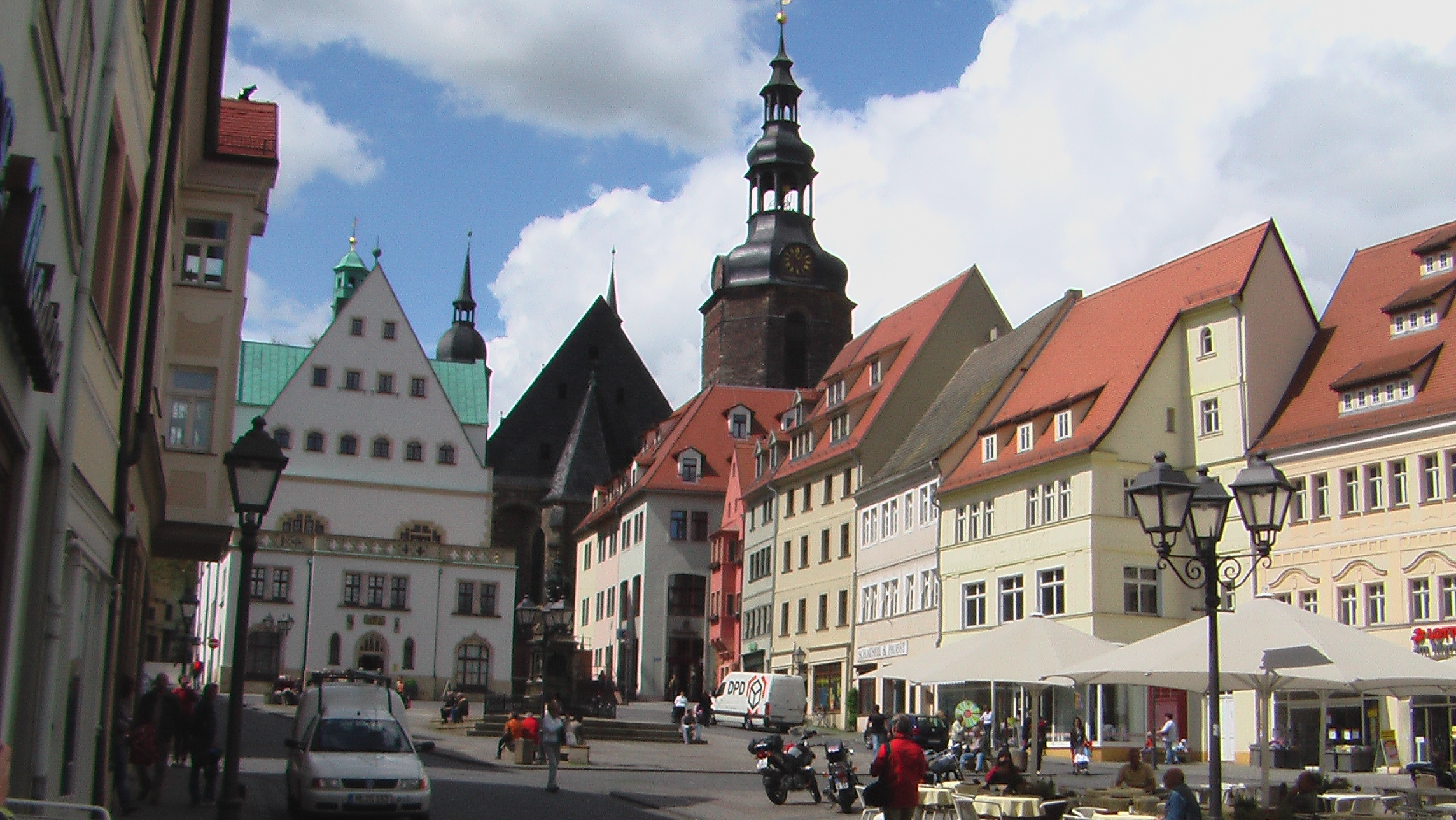

- Coat of arms

- Location of Eisleben within Mansfeld-Südharz district
- Interactive map of Eisleben
- Location within Germany Location within Saxony-Anhalt
- Coordinates: 51°31′43″N 11°32′48″E
- Country: Germany
- State: Saxony-Anhalt
- District: Mansfeld-Südharz
- Subdivisions: 6

Government
  - Mayor (2019–26): Carsten Staub (CDU)

Area
  - Total: 143.87 km^{2} (55.55 sq mi)
- Elevation: 114 m (374 ft)

Population (2025-12-31)
  - Total: 22,225
  - Density: 154.48/km^{2} (400.10/sq mi)
- Time zone: UTC+01:00 (CET)
  - Summer (DST): UTC+02:00 (CEST)
- Postal codes: 06295
- Dialling codes: 03475, 034773, 034776
- Vehicle registration: MSH, EIL, HET, ML, SGH
- Website: www.eisleben.eu

Eisleben (German pronunciation: [ˈaɪsleːbn̩]) is a town in Saxony-Anhalt, Germany. It is famous as both the hometown of the influential theologian Martin Luther and the place where he died; hence, its official name is Lutherstadt Eisleben.

First mentioned in the late 10th century, Eisleben is divided into the old town of Altstadt, and new town of Neustadt. Neustadt was created for Eisleben's miners in the 14th century. As of 2020, Eisleben had a population of 22,668. It lies on the Halle–Kassel railway.

== History ==
Eisleben was first mentioned in 997 as a market called Islebia, and in 1180 as a town. The counts of Mansfeld governed the area until the 18th century. During the Protestant Reformation, Count Hoyer VI of Mansfeld-Vorderort (1477–1540) remained loyal to his Catholic faith, but the family's Mittelort and Hinterort branches sided with Martin Luther.

The German Peasants' War devastated the area, about a century before the Thirty Years War. Count Albert VII of Mansfeld-Hinterort (1480–1560) signed the Protestant Augsburg Confession in 1530 and joined the Schmalkaldic League, a defensive confederation of Protestant princes which ultimately lost the Schmalkaldic War over Saxony to the forces of Emperor Charles V but gained Lutheranism's recognition as an official religion within the Holy Roman Empire, letting princes determine the official religion within their lands.

After the Peace of Augsburg in 1555, the Countess of Mansfield, Agnes von Mansfeld-Eisleben, a Protestant canoness at the Abbey of Gerresheim to the east, converted Gebhard Truchsess von Waldburg, the Archbishop-Elector of Cologne, to Calvinism. Their marriage and his declaration of religious parity throughout his lands caused another round of religious war, the Cologne War. The couple fled numerous times through various German states before Gerhard relinquished his claims in 1588. He was unable to convert his electorate into a dynasty. He died and was buried in Strasbourg in 1601. His lady, who could not return to the convent, was afforded protection by the Dukes of Württemberg. She died in 1601, terminating the family's Mittelort branch.

In 1574, the surviving Mansfeld counts Hans Hoyer, Hans Georg, Hans Albrecht and Bruno concluded an agreement with the Elector of Saxony to repay the family's extensive debts, but some properties were forfeited by 1579 anyway. The Hinterort branches died out in 1666, but the Mansfeld-Vorderort line lasted until 1780, when it too became extinct and Eisleben came directly under the Electorate of Saxony. After the Napoleonic Wars ended, the Vienna Congress assigned Eisleben to the Kingdom of Prussia, which had long been allied with House of Welf which held the Duchy of Magdeburg, and after secularization in 1680 was administered by the Elector of Brandenburg.

=== 20th century ===
The Prussian Province of Saxony became part of the Free State of Prussia after World War I. It was the scene of fighting during the March Action in 1921.

On 6 June 1927, American aviator Clarence D. Chamberlin landed in a wheat field outside Eisleben, completing the first transatlantic passenger flight (Charles Albert Levine was the passenger), and breaking Charles Lindbergh's distance record that set only two weeks earlier in Paris.

In 1947, after World War II, Eisleben became part of the new state of Saxony-Anhalt within the German Democratic Republic (GDR). During the 1952 administration reform it became part of Bezirk Halle. After Germany's reunification in 1990, it became part of the re-created state Saxony-Anhalt. Eisleben was the capital of the former district of Mansfelder Land and of the former Verwaltungsgemeinschaft ("collective municipality") Lutherstadt Eisleben.

=== 21st century ===
Between 2004 and 2010, the town Eisleben absorbed 10 former municipalities: Volkstedt in 2004, Rothenschirmbach and Wolferode in 2005, Polleben and Unterrißdorf in 2006, Bischofrode, Osterhausen and Schmalzerode in 2009, and Burgsdorf and Hedersleben in 2010.

=== Historical population ===
The population has been declining since the mid-1960s due to declining birth rates and outward migration, although the municipal area has been enlarged several times by merging with neighboring districts.

| Year | 1964 | 1971 | 1981 | 1989 | 1995 | 2000 | 2002 | 2004 | 2006 | 2008 |
| Inhabitants* | 44,773 | 41,682 | 37,330 | 35,374 | 31,882 | 29,526 | 28,848 | 28,040 | 27,037 | 26,190 |

| Year | 2010 | 2011 | 2012 | 2013 | 2014 | 2015 |
| Inhabitants* | 25,489 | 25,380 | 24,384 | 24,284 | 24,346 | 24,198 |

* population as of 31 December, except for 1964–1981: census

== Geography ==
The town Eisleben consists of Eisleben proper and the following 11 Ortschaften or municipal divisions:

- Bischofrode
- Burgsdorf
- Hedersleben
- Helfta
- Osterhausen
- Polleben
- Rothenschirmbach
- Schmalzerode
- Unterrißdorf
- Volkstedt
- Wolferode

=== Helfta ===
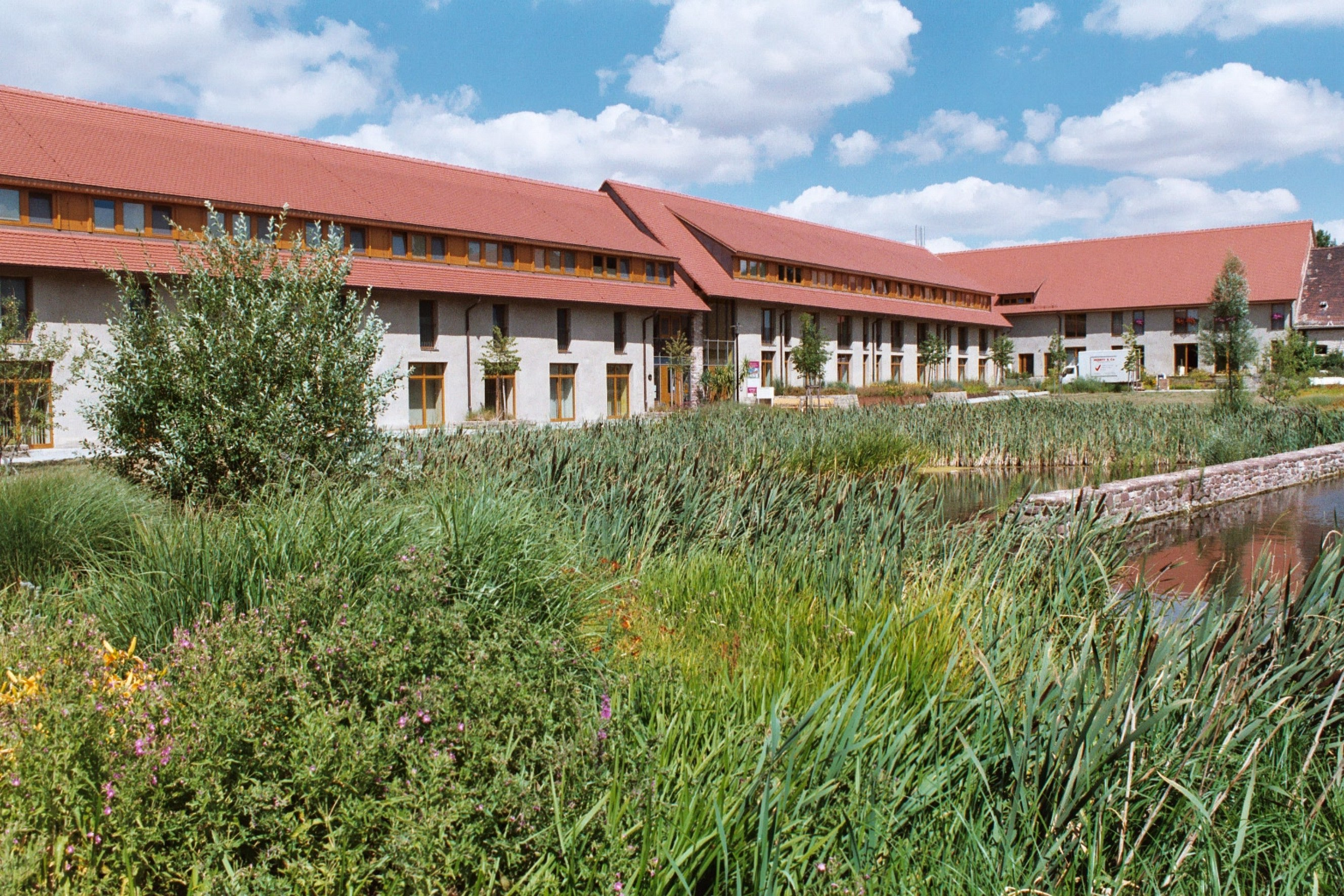
Convent of Our Lady, Helfta

The Counts of Mansfeld in 1229 endowed a nunnery on the grounds of their castle, then built another monastery at Helfta near Eisleben, which was founded in 1258. Governed under either Benedictines or Cistercians, Helfta became known for its powerful and mystical abbesses, most of all Gertrude of Hackeborn, Gertrude the Great and Mechtild of Magdeburg. However, Duke Albrecht of Brunswick destroyed the nunnery in 1342. Rebuilt the following year, it was sometimes called the "crown of German convents". It closed in 1524, during the religious wars sometimes associated with Martin Luther, but reopened on a smaller scale until 1542, after which it became secularized, and controlled by local farmers. In 1712 it became a farm run by the Prussian state, and the buildings were reused accordingly. In 1950, the German Democratic Republic turned it into a fruit farm. In 1994, after Germany's reunification, the Catholic Diocese of Magdeburg bought the property using donations from all over the world and soon began restoration. Cistercian nuns from Seligenthal in Bavaria moved into the cloister starting circa 1999, Since 2006 Helfta has been on the southern portion of a major European cultural route, the Romanesque Road.

== Martin Luther ==
Luther Memorials in Eisleben
UNESCO World Heritage Site
- Interactive map of Luther Memorials in Eisleben
- Part of: Luther Memorials in Eisleben and Wittenberg
- Includes: 1. Luther's birthplace 2. The house in which Luther died
- Criteria: Cultural: (iv)(vi)
- Reference: 783
- Inscription: 1996 (20th Session)
- Area: 0.20 ha (22,000 sq ft)
- Buffer zone: 1.93 ha (208,000 sq ft)

The Protestant reformer Martin Luther was born in Eisleben on 10 November 1483. His father, Hans Luther, was a miner like many in Eisleben. Luther's family moved to Mansfeld when he was only a year old and he lived in Wittenberg most of his life. Seemingly by chance Luther preached his last sermon and died in Eisleben in 1546.

Eisleben took steps to preserve its Luther memorials as far back as 1689, and pioneered "heritage tourism." Danish poet Hans Christian Andersen came to Eisleben while researching Lutheran links as well as touring through Saxony and the Harz Mountains in 1831.

In 1997, Martin Luther's "Birth House" and "Death House" were designated a UNESCO World Heritage Site, together with the Luther sites in Wittenberg, because of their testimony to the lasting worldwide effects of Luther's religious and political reforms. Also, Luther was baptised in Eisleben's St. Peter and Paul Church (the original font survives) and preached his last sermons at St. Andreas Church, both of which continue in use.

== Notable people ==
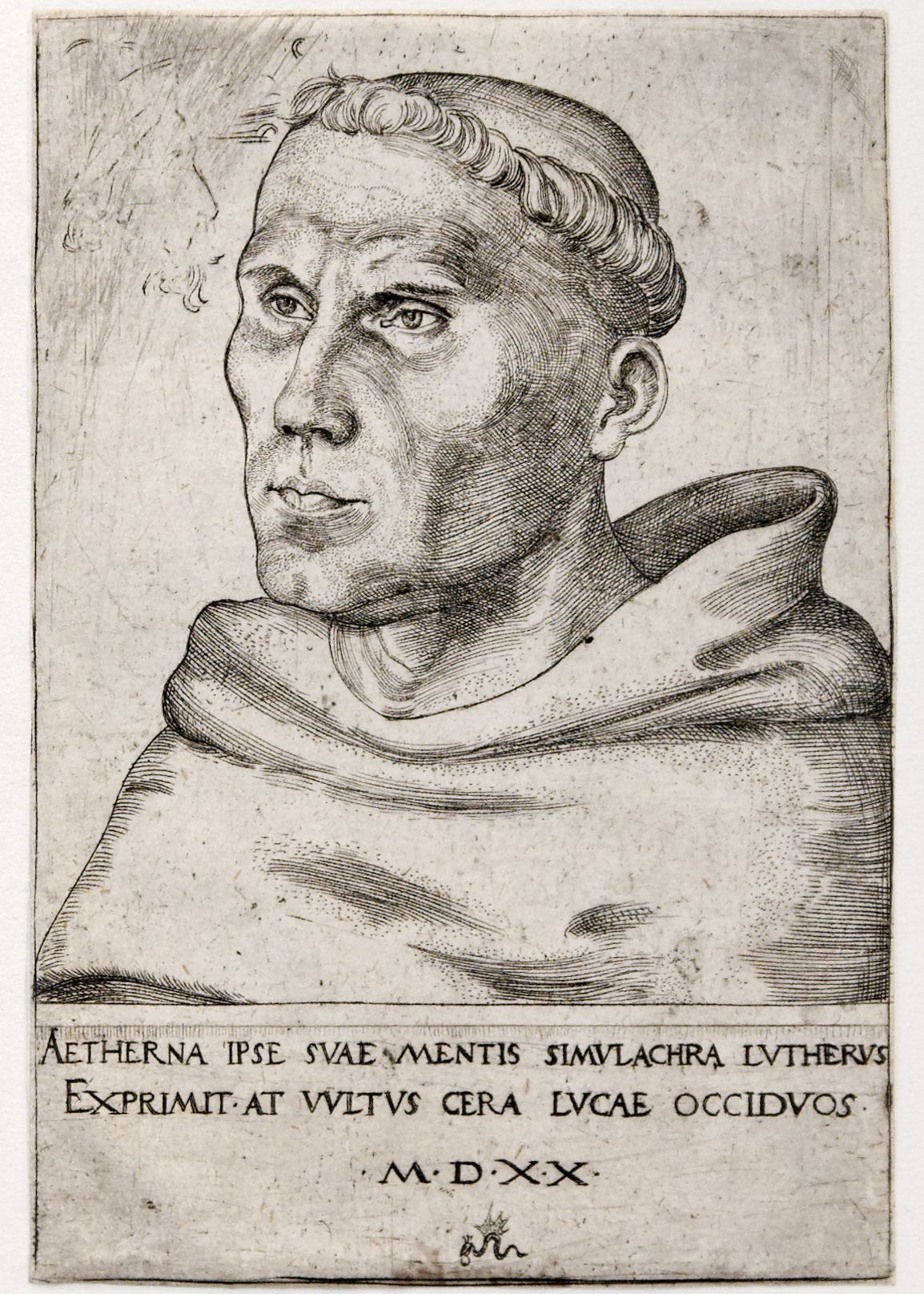
Martin Luther as a monk in 1520

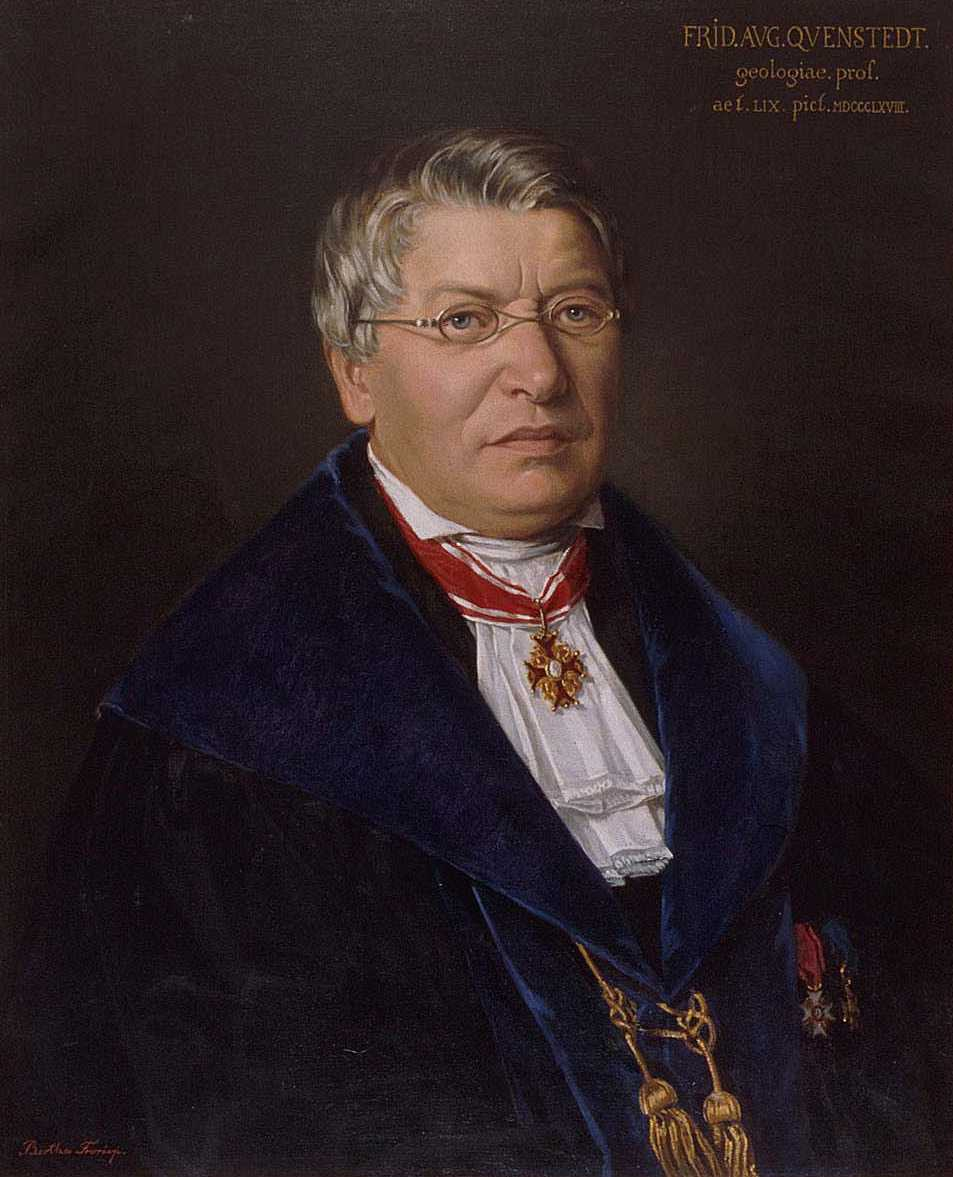
Friedrich August von Quenstedt in 1868

- Johannes Agricola (1494–1566), Protestant reformer
- Jana Bach (born 1979), actress, model and television host
- Gudrun Berend (1955–2011), hurdler
- Ingo Bodtke (born 1965), German politician
- Gertrude the Great (1256–1301), mystic, saint of the Catholic Church
- Ludwig Geyer (1779–1833), painter, playwright and actor
- Egbert Hayessen (1913–1944), major and resistance fighter
- Timo Hoffmann (born 1974), boxer
- Friedrich Koenig (1774–1821), printer
- Thomas Lange (born 1964), rower, two-time Olympic champion
- Hermann Lindrath (1896–1960), CDU politician and minister
- Martin Luther (1483–1546), Protestant reformer, author and professor of theology
- Werner Rataiczyk (1921–2021), painter
- Max Schneider (1875–1967), music historian
- Caspar Schütz (c. 1540–1594) historian
- Ute Starke (born 1939), gymnast
- Friedrich August von Quenstedt (1809–1889), geologist and paleontologist

== Twin towns – sister cities ==
Eisleben is twinned with:

- Herne, Germany
- Memmingen, Germany
- Raismes, France
- Weinheim, Germany
