= House of Mansfeld =

German noble family

County of Mansfeld Grafschaft Mansfeld
- 1069–1580
- Coat of arms
- Status: County of the Holy Roman Empire
- Capital: Mansfeld
- Government: Principality
- Historical era: Early modern Europe
  - Pledged immediate County of Mansfeld: 1069
  - Mediatised to Saxony: 1580
Preceded by	Succeeded by
Duchy of Saxony	Electoral Saxony

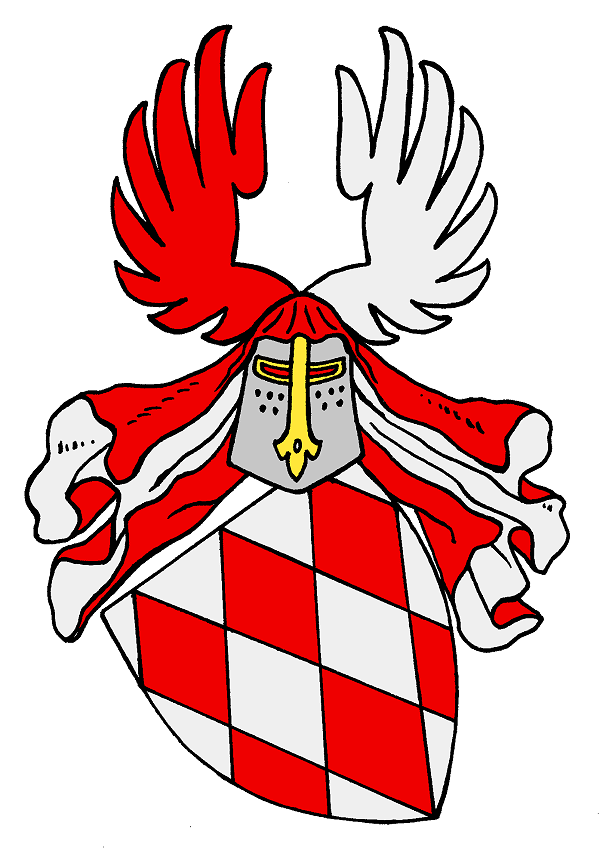
Original coat of arms of the House of Mansfeld (11.-12. century)

The House of Mansfeld was a German princely house, which took its name from the town of Mansfeld in the present-day state of Saxony-Anhalt. Mansfelds were archbishops, generals, supporters as well as opponents of Martin Luther, and Habsburg administrators.

== History ==
Upon the revolt instigated by the Wettin margrave Dedi I in 1069, Emperor Henry IV appointed the loyal House of Mansfeld counts (Grafen) in the Saxon Hassegau at Eisleben. The family progenitor, Count Hoyer I of Mansfeld, also known as Hoyer the Great, was a field marshal in the service of Emperor Henry V. He was killed at the Battle of Welfesholz on 11 February 1115, fighting the rebellious Saxon forces under Count Lothair of Supplinburg.

The Mansfelds held extended fiefs both in the Archbishopric of Magdeburg and the Bishopric of Halberstadt. The male line became extinct for the first time upon the death of Count Burchard of Mansfeld in 1229; his daughter Sophia married a scion of the Lords of Querfurt, who assumed the comital title. In the 15th century, the primary house divided into cadet branches: Hinterort, Mittelort, and Vorderort, while their County of Mansfeld in 1512 joined the Upper Saxon Circle as an immediate Imperial estate.

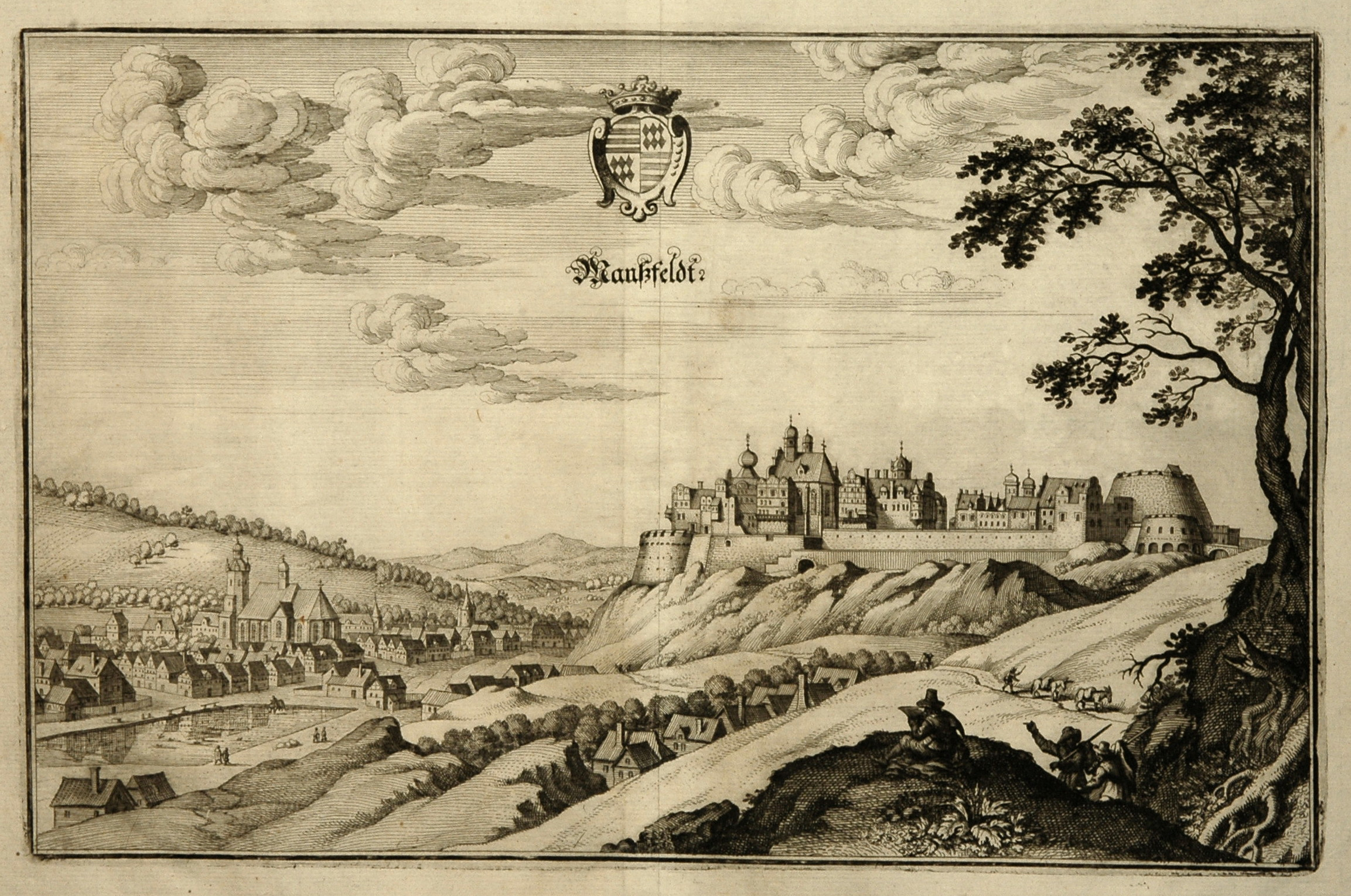
Mansfeld in 1650

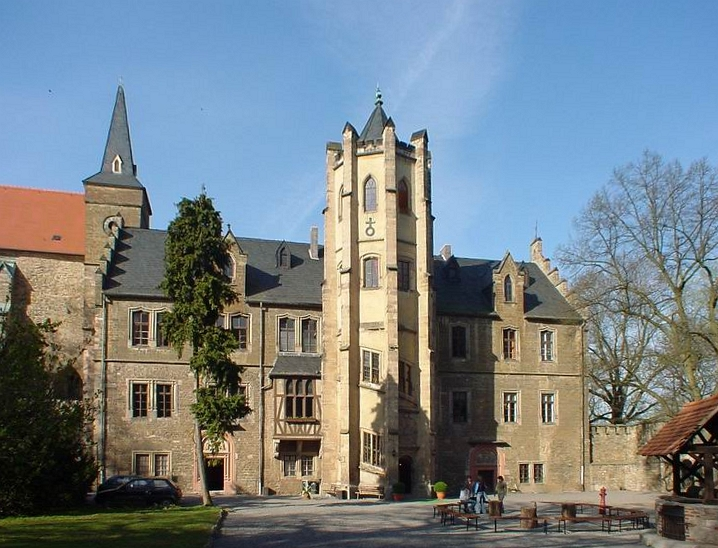
Mansfeld Castle

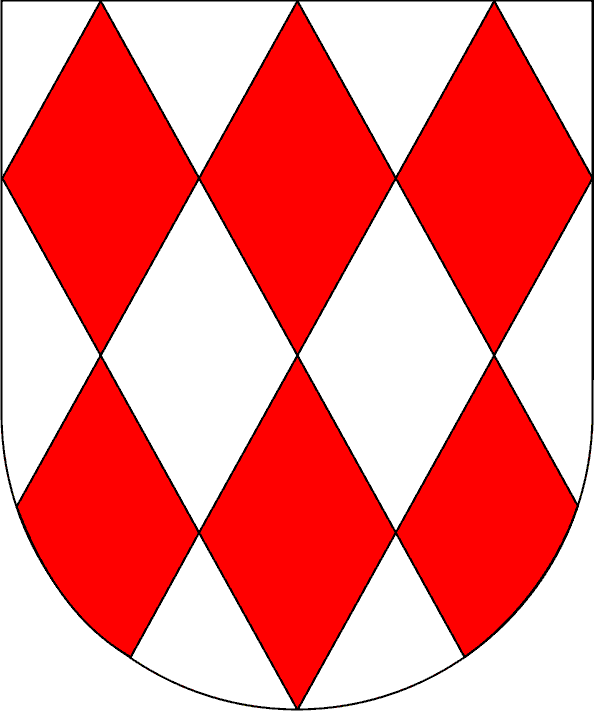
Mansfeld coat of arms until 1229

Mansfeld coat of arms from 1481

Things worsened with the Protestant Reformation: While Count Hoyer VI of Mansfeld-Vorderort (1477-1540) remained a loyal supporter of the Catholic faith, the Mittelort and Hinterort branches sided with Martin Luther. When the county was devastated during the German Peasants' War, Count Albert VII of Mansfeld-Hinterort (1480-1560) not only fought with the Imperial troops in the 1525 Battle of Frankenhausen, but also signed the Protestant Augsburg Confession in 1530 and joined the Schmalkaldic League, wherefore he was banned by Emperor Charles V after the 1547 Battle of Mühlberg.

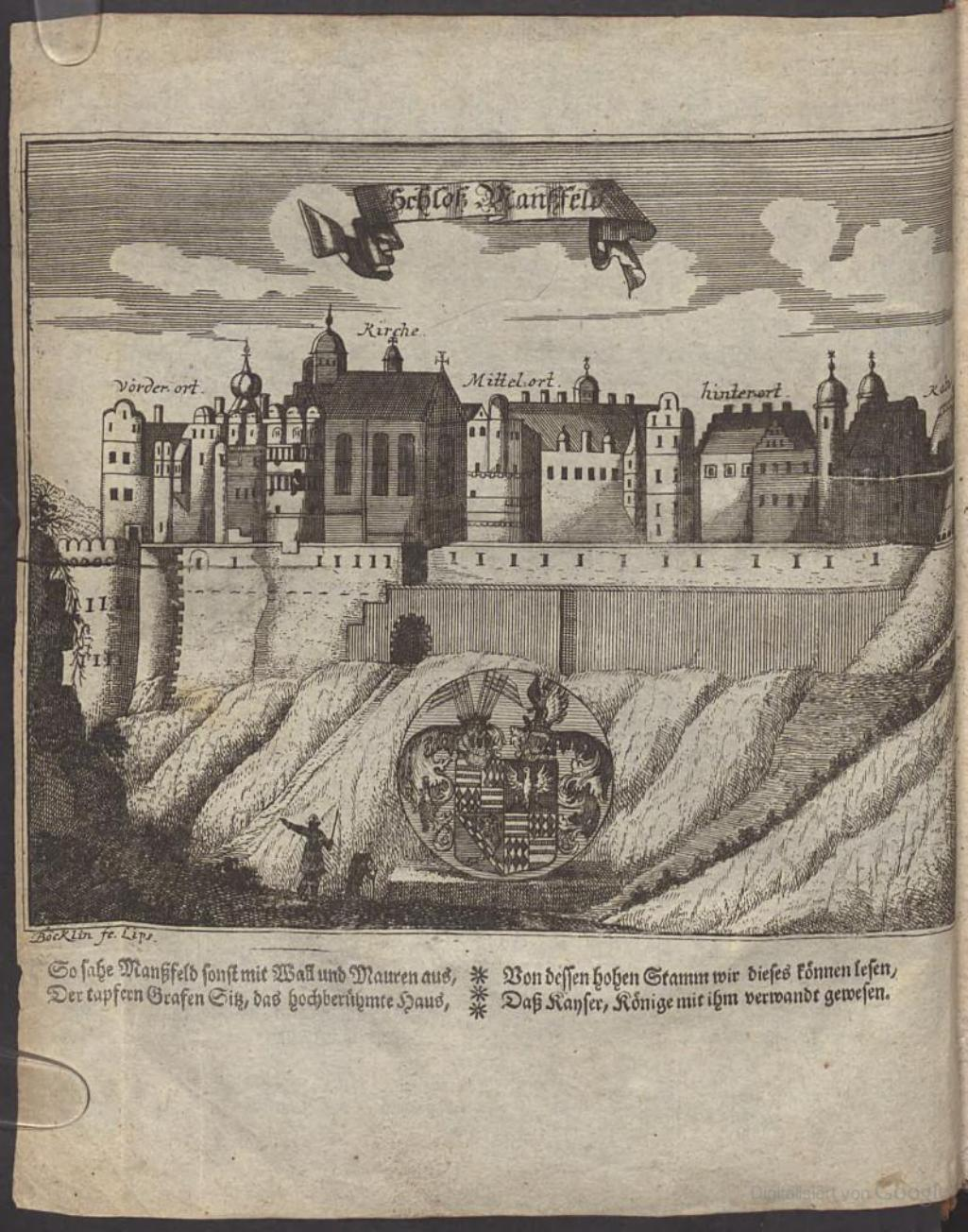
The engraving shows the many parts of the Mansfeld Castle, which would name the branches who kept each: Vorderort (Outer Castle and line), Mittelort (Middle Castle and line) and Hinterort (Inner Castle and line.

To settle the enormous debts of the Counts of Mansfeld, their mighty neighbour Elector Augustus of Saxony urged Emperor Maximilian II to appoint a committee. On 15 March 1574, and again on 5 July 1574, in Leipzig and Halle, respectively, the surviving counts Hans Hoyer, Hans Georg, Hans Albrecht and Bruno concluded an agreement for the repayment of debts incurred by Counts Peter Ernst I von Mansfeld-Vorderort, Hans Ernst and Bruno von Mansfeld. The family's assets were confiscated in 1579, whereafter Imperial immediacy was lost and mediatized between the Electorate of Saxony and the Archbishopric of Magdeburg.

The Mittelort and Hinterort branches died out in 1602 and 1666. The male Mansfeld-Vorderort line finally became extinct in 1780 with the death of Josef Wenzel Nepomuk, Prince of Fondi in Italy, and their fiefs fell back to the Electorate of Saxony and the Prussian Duchy of Magdeburg. Josef Wenzel's half-sister and heiress Maria Isabella was only able to retain the Bohemian possessions. In 1771 she had married Prince Franz de Paula Gundaker von Colloredo (1731–1807), last Vice Chancellor of the Holy Roman Empire from 1789, thereby establishing the House of Colloredo-Mansfeld, which claimed headship over the family after the German mediatization.

== Possessions ==
- Mansfeld Castle, ancestral seat
- Seeburg
- Heldrungen in Thuringia, purchased in 1479
- Allstedt, former Saxon Kaiserpfalz, acquired by Count Albert VII of Mansfeld in 1526
- La Fontaine Castle, Luxembourg-Clausen, built at the behest of Count Peter Ernst I of Mansfeld from 1563
- Dobříš, Bohemia, acquired in 1630

== Rulers ==
=== House of Mansfeld ===
Partitions of Mansfeld under Mansfeld rule

County of Hessengau (1050-1112); Renamed: County of Mansfeld (1112-1229)
						County of Neuchatel (with Mansfeld half 2) (1229-1319)
County of Schraplau (1256-1335)				County of Querfurt (with Mansfeld half 1) (1229-1335)		County of Neuchatel (with Mansfeld half 2) (1229-1319)
County of Aseleben (1382-1531)	County of Rammelburg (1382-1499)	County of Mansfeld (1335-1475)
County of Aseleben (1382-1531)	County of Rammelburg (1382-1499)			County of Outer Mansfeld (1475-1540)
County of Aseleben (1382-1531)	County of Rammelburg (1382-1499)		County of Middle Mansfeld (1486-1580)	County of Outer Mansfeld (1475-1540)
County of Inner Mansfeld (1475-1560)			County of Middle Mansfeld (1486-1580)	County of Outer Mansfeld (1475-1540)
County of Inner Mansfeld (1475-1560)			County of Middle Mansfeld (1486-1580)	County of Heldrungen (1540-1572)	County of Friedeburg (1540-1580)	County of Artern (1540-1580)	County of Arnstein (1540-1580)	County of Eisleben (1540-1580)
County of Middle Mansfeld (1560-1580)	County of Elder Mansfeld (1560-1580)	County of Younger Mansfeld (1560-1580)	County of Middle Mansfeld (1486-1580)	County of Bornstedt (1540-1580)	County of Friedeburg (1540-1580)	County of Artern (1540-1580)	County of Arnstein (1540-1580)	County of Eisleben (1540-1580)
Inherited Heldrungen in Outer Mansfeld	Demoted to: Lordship of Rammelburg (1580-1602)	Annexed to the Electorate of Saxony	Demoted to: Lordship of Schraplau (1580-1683) (Rammelburg line from 1613)	Lordship of Heldrungen (Inner Mansfeld Middle line) (1580-1666)	Demoted to: Lordship of Friedeburg (1580-1626)	Demoted to: Lordship of Artern (1580-1631)	Demoted to: Lordship of Arnstein (1580-1710) (Eisleben line from 1615)	Demoted to: Lordship of Eisleben (1580-1601)
Inherited Heldrungen in Outer Mansfeld	Inherited by the Berlepsch family	Annexed to the Electorate of Saxony	Demoted to: Lordship of Schraplau (1580-1683) (Rammelburg line from 1613)	Lordship of Heldrungen (Inner Mansfeld Middle line) (1580-1666)	Demoted to: Lordship of Bornstedt (1580-1794)		Demoted to: Lordship of Arnstein (1580-1710) (Eisleben line from 1615)	Castle burnt down; Annexed to the Electorate of Saxony
Inherited Heldrungen in Outer Mansfeld	Inherited by the Berlepsch family	Annexed to the Electorate of Saxony	Sold to the Counts of Hake family				Demoted to: Lordship of Arnstein (1580-1710) (Eisleben line from 1615)	Castle burnt down; Annexed to the Electorate of Saxony
Inherited Heldrungen in Outer Mansfeld	Inherited by the Berlepsch family	Annexed to the Electorate of Saxony	Sold to the Counts of Hake family	Bornstedt annexed to the Electorate of Saxony; Dobrtisch (and the Bohemian possessions) inherited by Colloredo family				Castle burnt down; Annexed to the Electorate of Saxony

Table of rulers

Monarch	Born	Reign	Ruling part	Consort	Death	Notes
Hoyer I	c.1030	c.1050 – 1070	County of Hessengau	Christina of Sangerhausen one child	c.1070 aged 39–40	First member of the family.
Hoyer II the Great	c.1060 Son of Hoyer I and Christina of Sangerhausen	c.1070 – 11 February 1115	County of Hessengau (until 1112) County of Mansfeld (from 1112)	Unknown two children	11 February 1115; Welfesholz aged 54–55	
Hoyer III	c.1100 Son of Hoyer II	11 February 1115 – 1160	County of Mansfeld	Kunigunde of Ammensleben c.1140 four/five children	c.1160 aged 59–60	
Hoyer IV	c.1130 Son of Hoyer III and Kunigunde of Ammensleben	1160 – July 1183	County of Mansfeld	Bia of Arnsberg one child	July 1183 aged 52–53	
Burchard I	c.1160 Son of Hoyer IV and Bia of Arnsberg	July 1183 – 13 December 1229	County of Mansfeld	Elisabeth of Schwarzburg (d.c.1240); 1189 one child	13 December 1229 aged 68–69	
Gertrude	c.1200 First daughter of Burchard I and Elisabeth of Schwarzburg	13 December 1229 – c.1235	County of Mansfeld (Neuchâtel branch, half 1)	Herman I c.1225 eight children	c.1235 aged 34–35	Children and heiresses of Burchard I, divided their inheritance. Two female branches were formed: the Neuchâtel and the Quefurt branches.
Herman I	1214; Son of Meinher I, Burgrave of Meissen and Irmentrut	13 December 1229 – 1270	County of Mansfeld (Neuchâtel branch, half 1)	Gertrude c.1225 eight children Unknown three children	c.1270 aged 65–66	Children and heiresses of Burchard I, divided their inheritance. Two female branches were formed: the Neuchâtel and the Quefurt branches.
Sophia	c.1200 Second daughter of Burchard I and Elisabeth of Schwarzburg	13 December 1229 – c.1235	County of Mansfeld (Querfurt branch, half 2)	1217 four children	c.1235 aged 34–35	Children and heiresses of Burchard I, divided their inheritance. Two female branches were formed: the Neuchâtel and the Quefurt branches.
Burchard II	c.1200 Son of Gebhard IV, Burgrave of Magdeburg and Luitgard of Nassau	13 December 1229 – c.1255	County of Mansfeld (Querfurt branch, half 2)	1217 four children	c.1255 aged 54–55	Children and heiresses of Burchard I, divided their inheritance. Two female branches were formed: the Neuchâtel and the Quefurt branches.
Burchard III	c.1230 First son of Burchard II and Sophia	1255 – 4 December 1273	County of Mansfeld (Querfurt branch, half 2)	Elisabeth Matilda of Schwarzburg c.1250 one child Irmgard c.1255? no children Oda of Regenstein (d.c.1275) c.1260 three children	4 December 1273 aged 52–53	Children of Burchard II and Sophia, divided their inheritance.
Burchard Lappe	c.1230 Second son of Burchard II and Sophia	1255 – 1305	Lordship of Schraplau	? of Lobdeburg-Arnshaugk five children	1305 aged 74–75?	Children of Burchard II and Sophia, divided their inheritance.
Herman II	c.1230 Second son of Herman I and Gertrude	1270 – 1297	County of Mansfeld (Neuchâtel branch, half 1)	Heilwig of Berka (d.c.1290) c.1265 three children	c.1294 aged 63–64	Brothers, ruled jointly. Henry's children apparently didn't claim their Mansfeld part of the territory, which returned to the Quefuert branch.
Henry	c.1230 Fifth son of Herman I and Gertrude	1270 – 1305	County of Mansfeld (Neuchâtel branch, half 1)	Unknown five children	c.1305 aged 74–75	Brothers, ruled jointly. Henry's children apparently didn't claim their Mansfeld part of the territory, which returned to the Quefuert branch.
Half of Mansfeld (with exceptions) returned to the other half
Elisabeth	c.1275 Daughter of Herman II and Heilwig of Berka	1297 – 1320	County of Mansfeld (Neuchâtel branch, half 1, at Bad Berka)	Frederick, Count of Rabenswald and Wiehe (c.1255-1312); 1280 at least one child	Left he inheritance to her own descendants.	c.1320 aged 65–66
Berka inherited by the House of Schwarzburg
Burchard the Elder	c.1270 Son of Burchard Lappe and ? of Lobdeburg-Arnshaugk	1305 – 1335	Lordship of Schraplau	Oda of Wernigerode c.1303 fourteen children	c.1340 aged 69–70?	In 1335 sold Schraplau back to the main line of the county, which reunified once more.
Schraplau re-merged in Mansfeld
Gebhard I	c.1250 Son of Burchard III and Elisabeth Matilda of Schwarzburg	4 December 1273 – 1282	County of Mansfeld (Querfurt branch, half 2 until 1305; in all Mansfeld since 1305)	Irmgard of Anhalt c.1275 three children	1282 aged 31–32	Half-brothers, shared rule.
Burchard IV	c.1250 Son of Burchard III and Oda of Regenstein	4 December 1273 – October 1311	County of Mansfeld (Querfurt branch, half 2 until 1305; in all Mansfeld since 1305)	Sophie of Lüchow (d.c.1350) c.1285 five children	October 1311 aged 60–61	Half-brothers, shared rule.
Gebhard II	c.1275 Son of Gebhard I and Irmgard of Anhalt	October 1311 – 1313	County of Mansfeld	Unmarried	1313 aged 37–38	Left no children. The county passed to the children of his uncle Burchard IV.
Burchard V	c.1290 Son of Burchard IV and Sophie of Lüchow	1313 – 1355	County of Mansfeld	Oda of Wernigerode (1290-1343) c.1305 five children	c.1355 aged 64–65	
Burchard VI	c.1310 First son of Burchard V and Oda of Wernigerode	1355 – 1358	County of Mansfeld	Unmarried	1358 aged 47–48	Children of Burchard V, ruled jointly.
Gebhard III	c.1310 Second son of Burchard V and Oda of Wernigerode	1355 – 1360	County of Mansfeld	Luitgard of Valkenstein (c.1265-1335?); 1327 six children	1360 aged 49–50	Children of Burchard V, ruled jointly.
Gebhard IV	c.1330 First son of Gebhard III and Luitgard of Valkenstein	1360 – 5 November 1382	County of Mansfeld	Matilda of Schwarzburg-Arnstadt (1340-4 June 1373) c.1360 four children Elisabeth of Käfernburg (1345-15 March 1382) c.1375 three children	5 November 1382 aged 51–52	Children of Gebhard III, ruled jointly.
Albert I	c.1330 Second son of Gebhard III and Luitgard of Valkenstein	1360 – 1362	County of Mansfeld	Judith of Schwarzburg-Blankenburg (d.30 June 1361); 1354 two children Helena of Schwarzburg-Leutenberg (1342-1382); 1 December 1358 one child	1362 aged 31–32	Children of Gebhard III, ruled jointly.
Council of Regency (1382-1394)						Children of Gebhard IV, divided their inheritance.
Burchard VII	1356; First son ofGebhard IV and Matilda of Schwarzburg-Arnstadt	5 November 1382 – 1392	County of Mansfeld	Agnes of Brunswick-Lüneburg; 1366 no children	1392; 35-36	Children of Gebhard IV, divided their inheritance.
Albert II	1376; First son ofGebhard IV and Elisabeth of Käfernburg	5 November 1382 – 5 April 1416	County of Mansfeld	Elisabeth of Anhalt-Dessau (d. November 1413) c.1390 two children	5 April 1416 aged 39–40	Children of Gebhard IV, divided their inheritance.
Günther I	c.1360 Second son ofGebhard IV and Matilda of Schwarzburg-Arnstadt	5 November 1382 – 4 March 1412	County of Aseleben	Elisabeth of Hohnstein-Klettenberg; 1393 three children	4 March 1412 aged 51–52	Children of Gebhard IV, divided their inheritance.
Wolrad I	c.1380 Second son ofGebhard IV and Elisabeth of Käfernburg	5 November 1382 – 1450	County of Rammelburg	Anna of Gleichen (d.1 December 1435); 1431 no children Margaret of Glogów-Żagań (c.1420-1491); 1435 five children	1450 aged 69–70	Children of Gebhard IV, divided their inheritance.
Gebhard V	c.1391 First son of Günther I and Elisabeth of Hohnstein-Klettenberg	4 March 1412 – 25 July 1438	County of Aseleben	Ursula, Countess of Schwarzburg (d.1461); 1393 three children	4 March 1412 aged 51–52	Children of Gunther I, ruled jointly.
Burchard VIII	c.1395 Second son of Günther I and Elisabeth of Hohnstein-Klettenberg	4 March 1412 – 1423	County of Aseleben	Unmarried	1423 aged 27–28	Children of Gunther I, ruled jointly.
Council of Regency (1416-1424)						Children of Albert II, ruled jointly. Hoyer was a canon at Halberstadt.
Günther II	c.1410 First son of Albert II and Elisabeth of Anhalt-Dessau	5 April 1416 – 10 March 1475	County of Mansfeld	Anna of Hohnstein-Klettenberg (1410 - 25 November 1450); 1435 four children Margaret of Henneberg-Hartenberg (1415 - c.1460) c.1450 one child	10 March 1475 aged 39–40	Children of Albert II, ruled jointly. Hoyer was a canon at Halberstadt.
Hoyer V	c.1410 Second son of Albert II and Elisabeth of Anhalt-Dessau	5 April 1416 – 1425	County of Mansfeld	Unmarried	c.1425 aged 14–15	Children of Albert II, ruled jointly. Hoyer was a canon at Halberstadt.
Regency of Ursula, Countess of Schwarzburg (1438-1443)						
Gebhard VI	1429; Son of Gebhard V and Ursula, Countess of Schwarzburg	25 July 1438 – 14 September 1492	County of Aseleben	Adelaide of Oldenburg (1429 - 21 December 1492); May 1457 three children	14 September 1492 aged 62–63	
Regency of Margaret of Glogów-Żagań (1450-1464)						Children of Wolrad I, ruled jointly.
Burchard IX	c.1435 First son of Wolrad I and Margaret of Glogów-Żagań	1450 – 23 September 1460	County of Rammelburg	Catharina of Schwarzburg-Blankenburg (2 February 1442 - 9 December 1484); 5 November 1458; Arnstadt no children	23 September 1460; Arnstadt aged 24–25	Children of Wolrad I, ruled jointly.
Wolrad II	September 1448; Second son of Wolrad I and Margaret of Glogów-Żagań	1450 – 27 November 1499	County of Rammelburg	Margarethe of Hohnstein-Vierraden (d.15 October 1508) c.1470 three children	27 November 1499; Merseburg aged 51	Children of Wolrad I, ruled jointly.
Rammelburg annexed to Inner Mansfeld
Albert III	c.1450 First son of Günther II and Anna of Hohnstein-Klettenberg	10 March 1475 – 3 December 1484	County of Outer Mansfeld	Susanna of Bickenbach (1469-20 April 1530) c.1450 six children	3 December 1484; Leipzig aged 33–34	Children of Gunther II, divided their rule. The namings of the parts come from the castle part each of the brothers inherited. The Mansfeld Castle is a composition of three smaller castles, aligned: the Outer one (Vorderort), the Middle one (Mittelort) and the Inner one (Hinterort). In this case, Albert inherited the Outer one, and Ernest the Inner and Middle ones. Each of the castles had other properties associated with it.
Ernest I	c.1455 Second son of Günther II and Anna of Hohnstein-Klettenberg	10 March 1475 – 10 July 1486	County of Inner Mansfeld	Margaret, Countess of Mansfeld-Aseleben (1458 - 20 February 1531) c.1475 two children	10 July 1486 aged 30–31	Children of Gunther II, divided their rule. The namings of the parts come from the castle part each of the brothers inherited. The Mansfeld Castle is a composition of three smaller castles, aligned: the Outer one (Vorderort), the Middle one (Mittelort) and the Inner one (Hinterort). In this case, Albert inherited the Outer one, and Ernest the Inner and Middle ones. Each of the castles had other properties associated with it.
Regency of Susanna of Bickenbach (1484-1490)						Children of Albert III, divided their inheritance. After Gunther and Hoyer's death with no children, the inheritance was divided between the many children of Ernest II, specifically into six parts.
Günther III	24 March 1476; First son of Albert III and Susanna of Bickenbach	3 December 1484 – 3 July 1526	County of Outer Mansfeld	Anna of Gleichen-Tonna (d.c.1500) c.1490? no children Agnes of Gleichen-Blankenhein (d.19 April 1536); 4 June 1503 no children	3 July 1526; Mansfeld Castle aged 50	Children of Albert III, divided their inheritance. After Gunther and Hoyer's death with no children, the inheritance was divided between the many children of Ernest II, specifically into six parts.
Hoyer VI	11 February 1482; Fourth son of Albert III and Susanna of Bickenbach	3 December 1484 – 9 January 1540	County of Outer Mansfeld	Unmarried	9 January 1540; Mansfeld Castle aged 57	Children of Albert III, divided their inheritance. After Gunther and Hoyer's death with no children, the inheritance was divided between the many children of Ernest II, specifically into six parts.
Ernest II	6 December 1479; Third son of Albert III and Susanna of Bickenbach	3 December 1484 – 9 May 1531	County of Outer Mansfeld (at Heldrungen)	Barbara of Querfurt (c.1485 - 23 January 1511); 1500; Stolberg nine children Dorothea of Solms-Lich; 14 June 1512 thirteen children	9 May 1531; Artern aged 51	Children of Albert III, divided their inheritance. After Gunther and Hoyer's death with no children, the inheritance was divided between the many children of Ernest II, specifically into six parts.
Regency of Margaret, Countess of Mansfeld-Aseleben (1486-1497)						Children of Ernest I, divided their inheritance. Gebhard received Middle Mansfeld (or the middle castle of the three of Mansfeld Castle and Albert the Outer castle of Mansfeld, each of which had other properties associated with it.
Gebhard VII	1478; First son of Ernest I and Margaret, Countess of Mansfeld-Aseleben	10 July 1486 – 13 September 1558	County of Middle Mansfeld	Margaret of Gleichen-Blankenhein (d.1 August 1567); 1509/10 nine children	13 September 1558; Mansfeld Castle aged 79–80	Children of Ernest I, divided their inheritance. Gebhard received Middle Mansfeld (or the middle castle of the three of Mansfeld Castle and Albert the Outer castle of Mansfeld, each of which had other properties associated with it.
Albert IV	18 June 1480; Leipzig; Second son of Ernest I and Margaret, Countess of Mansfeld-Aseleben	10 July 1486 – 4 March 1560	County of Inner Mansfeld	Anna of Hohnstein-Klettenberg; 1518 fifteen children	4 March 1560; Leutenberg aged 79	Children of Ernest I, divided their inheritance. Gebhard received Middle Mansfeld (or the middle castle of the three of Mansfeld Castle and Albert the Outer castle of Mansfeld, each of which had other properties associated with it.
Margaret	1458; Daughter of Gebhard VI and Adelaide of Oldenburg	14 September 1492 – 20 February 1531	County of Aseleben	Ernest I, Count of Inner Mansfeld; 1475 two children Henry XXII, Lord of Weida c.1490 one child	20 February 1531; Wildenfels aged 72–73	Inherited her father's estates, and after her death they were re-absorbed in Mansfeld.
Aseleben inherited by Inner Mansfeld
Philip I	28 October 1502; Son of Ernest II and Barbara of Querfurt	9 January 1540 – 9 July 1546	County of Bornstedt	Amalia of Leisnig (22 July 1508 - 22 February 1569); 26 February 1536 four children	9 July 1546; Bornstedt Castle aged 43	Children of Ernest II, divided the inheritance. In 1579, their shares of the county were sequestrated due to debt, and in the next year mediatized by the Electorate of Saxony (see note below). Despite losing the purpose of the title, they could still hold sovereignty over their castles.
John George I	1515; First son of Ernest II and Dorothea of Solms-Lich	9 January 1540 – 14 August 1579	County of Eisleben	Catharina of Inner Mansfeld; 1541 thirteen children	14 August 1579; Dresden aged 51	Children of Ernest II, divided the inheritance. In 1579, their shares of the county were sequestrated due to debt, and in the next year mediatized by the Electorate of Saxony (see note below). Despite losing the purpose of the title, they could still hold sovereignty over their castles.
Peter Ernest I	12 August 1517; Heldrungen Castle; Second son of Ernest II and Dorothea of Solms-Lich	9 January 1540 – 23 May 1604	County of Friedeburg (until 1580) Lordship of Friedeburg (from 1580)	Margaret of Brederode (d.31 May 1554); 1 April 1542; Brussels five children Marie de Montmorency (d.5 February 1570); 22 February 1562; Weert two children Anna of Benzerath; 28February 1561; Brussels three children Katharina Wetzeler one child	23 May 1604; Luxembourg aged 86	Children of Ernest II, divided the inheritance. In 1579, their shares of the county were sequestrated due to debt, and in the next year mediatized by the Electorate of Saxony (see note below). Despite losing the purpose of the title, they could still hold sovereignty over their castles.
John Albert	5 February 1522; Heldrungen Castle; Third son of Ernest II and Dorothea of Solms-Lich	9 January 1540 – 8 July 1586	County of Arnstein (until 1580) Lordship of Arnstein (from 1580)	Magdalena of Schwarzburg; 29 October 1552; Arnstadt eleven children Catharina of Gleichen-Blankenhain (21 December 1548 - 9 February 1601); 30 January 1570; Kranichfeld no children	8 July 1586; Eisleben aged 64	Children of Ernest II, divided the inheritance. In 1579, their shares of the county were sequestrated due to debt, and in the next year mediatized by the Electorate of Saxony (see note below). Despite losing the purpose of the title, they could still hold sovereignty over their castles.
John Hoyer	1525; Sixth son of Ernest II and Dorothea of Solms-Lich	9 January 1540 – 14 May 1586	County of Artern (until 1580) Lordship of Artern (from 1580)	Martha of Inner Mansfeld; 16 February 1556; Mansfeld Castle nine children	14 May 1586; Artern aged 60–61	Children of Ernest II, divided the inheritance. In 1579, their shares of the county were sequestrated due to debt, and in the next year mediatized by the Electorate of Saxony (see note below). Despite losing the purpose of the title, they could still hold sovereignty over their castles.
John Ernest	1530; Seventh son of Ernest II and Dorothea of Solms-Lich	9 January 1540 – 29 September 1572	County of Heldrungen	Sara of Inner Mansfeld; 30 September 1555; Mansfeld Castle three children	29 September 1572; Mansfeld Castle aged 41–42	Children of Ernest II, divided the inheritance. In 1579, their shares of the county were sequestrated due to debt, and in the next year mediatized by the Electorate of Saxony (see note below). Despite losing the purpose of the title, they could still hold sovereignty over their castles.
Heldrungen annexed to Inner Mansfeld
By the mid-16th century, the amount of debts of the family, and the large number of children of the latest generation in the three castle lines led to financial problems. To settle this, their neighbour, Augustus, Elector of Saxony urged Emperor Maximilian II to appoint a committee, which, in 1579, sequestrated, with consent of the counts, their properties. The Mansfeld county formed an exclave within the Electorate of Saxony, a problem the Elector didn't take long to solve: seizing the opportunity with these unsolved debts, Augustus mediatised the County of Mansfeld. The family lost imperial immediacy and as so the right of land sovereignty. As so, despite being allowed to continue to use the title of Count, it was only titular, a de jure title from 1580 onwards. However, they could still hold sovereignty of the many castles that they still held, as de facto ruling Lords of these considerably smaller properties.
Regency of Amalia of Leisnig (1546-1550)						Left no children. The county passed to his brother.
Hugo	1536; First son of Philip I and Amalia of Leisnig	9 July 1546 – 16 January 1558	County of Bornstedt	Unmarried	16 January 1558; Bornstedt Castle aged 21–22	Left no children. The county passed to his brother.
Bruno I	17 November 1545; Second son of Philip I and Amalia of Leisnig	16 January 1558 – 14 April 1615	County of Bornstedt (until 1580) Lordship of Bornstedt (from 1580)	Christina of Barby-Mühlingen; 27 May 1571 eleven children	14 April 1615; Bornstedt Castle aged 43	Lost control of the county in 1580. His sovereignty was restricted to his castles.
Christopher	11 September 1520; Son of Gebhard VII and Margaret of Gleichen-Blankenhein	13 September 1558 – 29 August 1591	County of Middle Mansfeld (until 1580) Lordship of Schraplau (from 1580)	Amalia of Schwarzburg-Rudolstadt (23 March 1528 - 9 May 1589) c.1540 fourteen children	29 August 1591; Dresden aged 70–71	Lost control of the county in 1580. His sovereignty was restricted to his castles.
Wolrad III	11 March 1520; First son of Albert IV and Anna of Hohnstein-Klettenberg	4 March 1560 – 30 December 1578	County of Elder Mansfeld	Barbara Reuss of Plauen (1528-1580); 22 November 1556; Mansfeld Castle six children	30 December 1578; Strasbourg aged 58	Children of Albert IV, divided the property again, this time the parts were related to the order of birth of the owners of each part. Charles gave up his part to the Electorate of Saxony even before the 1579 property sequestration of the family.
John I	1526; Fourth son of Albert IV and Anna of Hohnstein-Klettenberg	4 March 1560 – 3 March 1567	County of Middle Mansfeld (at Rothenburg)	Dorothea of Pomerania-Stettin; 8 July 1554; Stettin two children Margaret of Brunswick-Lüneburg; 14 August 1559; Celle six children	3 March 1567; Moritzburg (Halle) aged 30–31	Children of Albert IV, divided the property again, this time the parts were related to the order of birth of the owners of each part. Charles gave up his part to the Electorate of Saxony even before the 1579 property sequestration of the family.
Charles	1534; Fifth son of Albert IV and Anna of Hohnstein-Klettenberg	4 March 1560 – 1575	County of Younger Mansfeld (at Allstedt)	Magdalene of Sayn (1542 - 7 September 1599); 28 October 1571 no children	17 February 1594 aged 59–60	Children of Albert IV, divided the property again, this time the parts were related to the order of birth of the owners of each part. Charles gave up his part to the Electorate of Saxony even before the 1579 property sequestration of the family.
Allstedt/Younger Mansfeld annexed to Inner Mansfeld
Regency of Margaret of Brunswick-Lüneburg (1546-1550)						Children of John I, ruled jointly. They lost control of the county in 1580. Their sovereignty was restricted to their castles. They changed seat from Rothenburg to Heldrungen.
Ernest III	28 July 1561; Rothenburg, Saxony-Anhalt; Third son of John I and Margaret of Brunswick-Lüneburg	3 March 1567 – 1580	County of Middle Mansfeld	Juliana of Salm-Püttlingen (September 1551 - 21 January 1607); 12 February 1589 four children Anna Sibylla von Wartenberg; 22 September 1608 one child	7 April 1609; Hergisdorf aged 47	Children of John I, ruled jointly. They lost control of the county in 1580. Their sovereignty was restricted to their castles. They changed seat from Rothenburg to Heldrungen.
Ernest III	28 July 1561; Rothenburg, Saxony-Anhalt; Third son of John I and Margaret of Brunswick-Lüneburg	1580 – 7 April 1609	Lordship of Heldrungen (Inner Mansfeld Middle line)	Juliana of Salm-Püttlingen (September 1551 - 21 January 1607); 12 February 1589 four children Anna Sibylla von Wartenberg; 22 September 1608 one child	7 April 1609; Hergisdorf aged 47	Children of John I, ruled jointly. They lost control of the county in 1580. Their sovereignty was restricted to their castles. They changed seat from Rothenburg to Heldrungen.
Frederick Christopher	4 February 1564; Fourth son of John I and Margaret of Brunswick-Lüneburg	3 March 1567 – 1580	County of Middle Mansfeld	Agnes of Everstein-Massow (1584-1626); 1610 four children	6 April 1631; Hedersleben aged 67	Children of John I, ruled jointly. They lost control of the county in 1580. Their sovereignty was restricted to their castles. They changed seat from Rothenburg to Heldrungen.
Frederick Christopher	4 February 1564; Fourth son of John I and Margaret of Brunswick-Lüneburg	1580 – 6 April 1631	Lordship of Heldrungen (Inner Mansfeld Middle line)	Agnes of Everstein-Massow (1584-1626); 1610 four children	6 April 1631; Hedersleben aged 67	Children of John I, ruled jointly. They lost control of the county in 1580. Their sovereignty was restricted to their castles. They changed seat from Rothenburg to Heldrungen.
John Caspar	1560; First son of Wolrad III and Barbara Reuss of Plauen	30 December 1578 – 1586	County of Elder Mansfeld (until 1580) Lordship of Rammelburg (from 1580)	Sophie Schenkin von Tautenburg no children	1586 aged 25–26	Left no children. He was succeeded by his brother.
Ernest IV	13 January 1544; Second son of John George I and Catharina of Inner Mansfeld	14 August 1579 – 1601	County of Eisleben (until 1580) Lordship of Eisleben (from 1580)	Unmarried	2 May 1609; Ansbach aged 65	Eldest surviving children of John George I, ruled jointly. In 1601, the castle of Eisleben was destroyed on a fire; the castle wasn't rebuilt before the intervention of the Elector of Saxony, which may imply that the indebted Eisleben branch lost their sovereignty. Luckily, Ernest and Hoyer's brother, Jobst, may have inherited the Arnstein line main seat in 1615.
Hoyer Christopher I	4 November 1554; Third son of John George I and Catharina of Inner Mansfeld	14 August 1579 – 1587	County of Eisleben (until 1580) Lordship of Eisleben (from 1580)	Unmarried	1587 aged 32–33	Eldest surviving children of John George I, ruled jointly. In 1601, the castle of Eisleben was destroyed on a fire; the castle wasn't rebuilt before the intervention of the Elector of Saxony, which may imply that the indebted Eisleben branch lost their sovereignty. Luckily, Ernest and Hoyer's brother, Jobst, may have inherited the Arnstein line main seat in 1615.
Eisleben was annexed to Saxony
John George II	6 June 1557; First son of John Hoyer and Martha of Inner Mansfeld	14 May 1586 – 5 September 1615	Lordship of Artern	Unmarried	5 September 1615; Artern aged 60–61	
Gebhard VIII	3 June 1553; First son of John Albert and Magdalena of Schwarzburg	8 July 1586 – 1 February 1601	Lordship of Arnstein	Unmarried	1 February 1601; Arnstein aged 47	Left no descendants. He was succeeded by his brother.
Frederick	1565; Fourth son of Wolrad III and Barbara Reuss of Plauen	1586 – 7 December 1592	Lordship of Rammelburg	Unmarried	7 December 1592; Belzheim aged 25–26	Left no children. He was succeeded by his brother.
William	1554; Fifth son of Christopher and Amalia of Schwarzburg-Rudolstadt	29 August 1591 – 1601	Lordship of Schraplau	Unmarried	1601 aged 45–46	
William	1555; Second son of John Albert and Magdalena of Schwarzburg	1 February 1601 – 21 October 1615	Lordship of Arnstein	Matilda of Nassau-Siegen; 24 June 1592 one child	21 October 1615; Ansbach aged 59–60	Left no male descendants. The county was inherited (possibly) by the dispossessed Eisleben branch.
Henry	1554; Sixth son of Christopher and Amalia of Schwarzburg-Rudolstadt	1601 – 5 April 1602	Lordship of Schraplau	Unmarried	5 April 1602; Schraplau aged 46–47	Left no descendants, and left the county to his youngest surviving sister.
Agnes Sibylla	20 November 1567; Fifth daughter of Christopher and Amalia of Schwarzburg-Rudolstadt	5 April 1602 – 24 August 1613	Lordship of Schraplau	David; 1602 no children	24 August 1613; Schraplau aged 45	After her death without children, her husband ruled the castle, recovering some power after being forced to sell his own stronghold at Rammelburg in 1602.
Peter Ernest II	1580; Luxembourg; Son of Peter Ernest I and Anna of Benzerath	23 May 1604 – 29 November 1626	Lordship of Friedeburg	Unmarried	29 November 1626; Rakovica aged 45–46	Focusing himself in the military career in the Low Countries, it's possible that he visited little (or maybe never visited at all) his possessions in Friedeburg. Left no children and his possessions returned to the elder Outer Mansfeld line, at Bornstedt.
Friedeburg was annexed to Bornstedt
Anna Juliana	5 April 1591; Hesenpütlingen; First son of Frederick Christopher and Agnes of Everstein-Massow	7 April 1609 – 1627	Lordship of Heldrungen (Inner Mansfeld Middle line) (at Püttlingen)	John, Count of Salm-Grumbach; 3 July 1609 six children	1627 aged 35–36?	Püttlingen was returned to Salm after her death.
Püttlingen was annexed to Salm
David	12 July 1571; Sixth son of Wolrad III and Barbara Reuss of Plauen	7 December 1592 – 1602	Lordship of Rammelburg	Agnes Sibylla of Mansfeld, Lady of Schraplau (20 November 1567 - 24 August 1613); 1602 no children Juliana Maria Reuss of Gera (1 February 1598 - 4 January 1650); 9 October 1614; Schleiz two children	26 March 1628; Schraplau aged 56	In 1602, David was forced, by his administrator from the Electorate of Saxony, to sell Rammelburg castle. However, he was married to the lady of Schraplau, and as so, he inherited her castle afte her death.
David	12 July 1571; Sixth son of Wolrad III and Barbara Reuss of Plauen	24 August 1613 – 26 March 1628	Lordship of Schraplau (Rammelburg line)	Agnes Sibylla of Mansfeld, Lady of Schraplau (20 November 1567 - 24 August 1613); 1602 no children Juliana Maria Reuss of Gera (1 February 1598 - 4 January 1650); 9 October 1614; Schleiz two children	26 March 1628; Schraplau aged 56	In 1602, David was forced, by his administrator from the Electorate of Saxony, to sell Rammelburg castle. However, he was married to the lady of Schraplau, and as so, he inherited her castle afte her death.
Wolfgang	1575; First son of Bruno I and Christina of Barby-Mühlingen	14 April 1615 – 15 May 1638	Lordship of Bornstedt (at Bornstedt proper)	Sophie Schenk von Tautenburg (1600-23 January 1636); 14 October 1618 five children	15 May 1638; Vienna aged 62–63	Children of Bruno I, divided the inheritance. Joachim Frederick's part was inherited by Bruno II.
Bruno II	13 September 1576; Second son of Bruno I and Christina of Barby-Mühlingen	14 April 1615 – 6 September 1644	Lordship of Bornstedt (at Dobříš)	Maria Manrique de Lara (1570-c.1640); 1608 four children	15 September 1644; Vienna aged 68	Children of Bruno I, divided the inheritance. Joachim Frederick's part was inherited by Bruno II.
Joachim Frederick	19 April 1581; Third son of Bruno I and Christina of Barby-Mühlingen	14 April 1615 – 29 April 1623	Lordship of Bornstedt (at Friedeburg)	Unmarried	29 April 1623; Friedeburg aged 42	Children of Bruno I, divided the inheritance. Joachim Frederick's part was inherited by Bruno II.
Wolrad IV	12 August 1558; Second son of John Hoyer and Martha of Inner Mansfeld	5 September 1615 – 25 August 1627	Lordship of Artern	Unmarried	25 August 1627; Artern aged 60–61	
Jobst	14 April 1558; Fifth son of John George I and Catharina of Inner Mansfeld	21 October 1615 – 30 December 1619	Lordship of Arnstein (Eisleben line)	Anna von Könitz (d.24 June 1637); 7 February 1592 five children	30 December 1619; Arnstein aged 61	Possibly an heir of the Arnstein Castle, which would re-establish sovereignty over a castle for the Eisleben line, who had lost theirs with the Eisleben fire of 1601.
John George II	10 May 1593; Son of Jobst and Anna von Könitz	30 December 1619 – 19 February 1647	Lordship of Arnstein (Eisleben line)	Barbara Maria of Stolberg (1 December 1596 - 21 March 1636); 6 May 1633; Stolberg one child Barbara Magdalena, Lady of Schraplau (12 January 1618 – 25 December 1696); 2 November 1637; Arnstein six children	19 February 1647; Schraplau aged 53	After the marriage with the heiress of Schraplau, the family moved to her castle.
Philip Ernest	11 May 1560; Third son of John Hoyer and Martha of Inner Mansfeld	25 August 1627 – 15 September 1631	Lordship of Artern	Eva Reuss of Lower Greiz (31 May 1593 - 4 July 1636); 20 July 1613; Eilenburg no children	15 September 1631; Torgau aged 60–61	Last of his line, died without descendants. Artern was annexed to Arnstein.
Artern was annexed to Arnstein
Regency of Juliana Maria Reuss of Gera (1628-1632)						In 1683, Barbara sold the Lordship of Schraplau to the Lords of Hake.
Barbara Magdalena	12 January 1618; Daughter of David and Juliana Maria Reuss of Gera	26 March 1628 – 1683	Lordship of Schraplau (Rammelburg line)	John George III, Lord of Mansfeld-Arnstein; 2 November 1637; Arnstein six children Johann Anton, Lord of Werthern-Brücken (d.1667); 4 February 1655; Schraplau no children George Andreas Schwab, Baron of Lichtenberg; 1680 no children George Albert of Mansfeld-Bornstedt; August 1696; Schleiz no children	25 December 1696; Holzzelle aged 56	In 1683, Barbara sold the Lordship of Schraplau to the Lords of Hake.
Schraplau was annexed to the Lords of Hake patrimony
Ernest Louis	19 June 1605; First son of Frederick Christopher and Agnes of Everstein-Massow	6 April 1631 – 9 April 1632	Lordship of Heldrungen (Inner Mansfeld Middle line)	Agnes Reuss of Gera (17 April 1600 - 1 January 1642); 10 June 1627; Gera four children	9 April 1632; Eisleben aged 26	
Regency of Agnes Reuss of Gera (1632-1637)						
Christopher Henry	16 January 1630; Holzzelle; Son of Ernest Louis and Agnes Reuss of Gera	9 April 1632 – 19 August 1637	Lordship of Heldrungen (Inner Mansfeld Middle line)	Unmarried	19 August 1637; Gera aged 7	
Christian Frederick	18 October 1615; Hedersleben; Second son of Frederick Christopher and Agnes of Everstein-Massow	19 August 1637 – 20 December 1666	Lordship of Heldrungen (Inner Mansfeld Middle line)	Maria Elisabeth of Lippe-Detmold (6 May 1611 - 13 December 1667); 18 March 1649; Sternberg no children	20 December 1666; Hedersleben aged 51	Left no children. Heldrungen was re-absorbed by Bornstedt.
Heldrungen was annexed to Bornstedt
Charles Adam	1629; Schluckenau; Son of Wolfgang and Sophie Schenk von Tautenburg	15 May 1638 – 30 May 1662	Lordship of Bornstedt (at Bornstedt proper)	Maria Theresa of Dietrichstein (1639 - 5 February 1658); 8 November 1654 no children	15 May 1638; Horneburg aged 33	After his childless death, Bornstedt was reunited under Dobříš line.
Francis Maximilian	21 November 1640; Vienna; First son of Bruno II and Maria Manrique de Lara	6 September 1644 – 12 September 1692	Lordship of Bornstedt (at Arnstein; from 1662 in Bornstedt proper)	Maria Anna Elisabeth of Harrach-Rohrau (24 November 1643 - 9 February 1698); 25 November 1683 eight children	12 September 1692 aged 52	Children of Bruno II, divided the inheritance. Henry Francis was awarded the title of Prince of Fondi in 1690. Charles Adam's part eventually went to Francis Maximilian. The brothers' children eventually married, reunifying the lordship.
Henry Francis I	13 September 1576; Bornstedt; Second son of Bruno II and Maria Manrique de Lara	6 September 1644 – 18 June 1715	Lordship of Bornstedt (at Heldrungen)	Marie Louise of Aspremont-Nantevil (1651/2 - 23 October 1692); 1679 two children Maria Franziska von Auersperg (1664 - 5 September 1739); 16 November 1693 no children	18 June 1715; Vienna aged 68	Children of Bruno II, divided the inheritance. Henry Francis was awarded the title of Prince of Fondi in 1690. Charles Adam's part eventually went to Francis Maximilian. The brothers' children eventually married, reunifying the lordship.
Regency of Barbara Magdalena, Lady of Schraplau (1647-1650)						
Hoyer Christopher II	23 March 1636; Son of John George II and Barbara Maria of Stolberg	19 February 1647 – 20 October 1653	Lordship of Arnstein (Eisleben line)	Unmarried	20 October 1653; Schraplau aged 17	
Regency of Barbara Magdalena, Lady of Schraplau (1653-1654)						After the sell, by his mother, of Schraplau (1683), John George moved back to Mansfeld Castle, where he died with no descendants. The Arnstein line property returned to the main Bornstedt line.
John George III	12 July 1640; Schraplau; Son of John George II and Barbara Magdalena, Lady of Schraplau	20 October 1653 – 1 January 1710	Lordship of Arnstein (Eisleben line)	Sophie Eleonore of Schönburg -Hartenstein (16 October/December 1649 - 17 October 1703); 20 October 1667; Hartenstein Castle no children Louise Christiane of Stolberg (21 January 1675 - 16 May 1738); 13 December 1704; Stolberg Castle no children	1 January 1710; Mansfeld Castle aged 69	After the sell, by his mother, of Schraplau (1683), John George moved back to Mansfeld Castle, where he died with no descendants. The Arnstein line property returned to the main Bornstedt line.
Arnstein was annexed to Bornstedt
Charles Francis	2 November 1678; Vienna; Son of Francis Maximilian and Maria Anna Elisabeth of Harrach-Rohrau	12 September 1692 – 9 July 1717	Lordship of Bornstedt (at Arnstein only until 1715; in all Bornstedt since 1715)	31 May 1703; Vienna five children	9 July 1717; Prague aged 52	Cousins and spouses, reunified the lordship. Maria Eleonora was the heiress of her father, and, in spite of her husband was a nephew of her father, it was possibly through her that he inherited the title of Prince of Fondi, and the Heldrungen part of Bornstedt.
Maria Eleonora	16 October 1682; Vienna; Daughter of Henry Francis I and Marie Louise of Aspremont-Nantevil	18 June 1715 – 9 July 1717	Lordship of Bornstedt (at Arnstein only until 1715; in all Bornstedt since 1715)	31 May 1703; Vienna five children	24 May 1747 aged 52	Cousins and spouses, reunified the lordship. Maria Eleonora was the heiress of her father, and, in spite of her husband was a nephew of her father, it was possibly through her that he inherited the title of Prince of Fondi, and the Heldrungen part of Bornstedt.
Regency of Maria Eleonora, Lady of Heldrungen (1717-1726)						
Henry Francis II	6 July 1712; Dobříš; Son of Charles Francis and Maria Eleonora	9 July 1717 – 15 February 1780	Lordship of Bornstedt	Maria Josepha Klara of Thun and Hohenstein (9 September 1714 - 17 September 1740); 7 January 1735 five children Maria Anna Czernin-Chudenitz (19 June 1722 - 15 January 1772); 29 April 1741 eight children	15 February 1780; Prague aged 67	
Joseph Wenceslaus	12 September 1735; Son of Henry Francis II and Maria Josepha Klara of Thun and Hohenstein	15 February – 31 March 1780	Lordship of Bornstedt	Elisabeth von Regal (21 February 1742 - c.1780); 29 February 1764; Vienna no children	31 March 1780 aged 44	Left no descendants. The majority of his properties were annexed to the Electorate of Saxony
Bornstedt (with exceptions) annexed to the Electorate of Saxony
Maria Isabella	29 August 1750; Prague; Daughter of Henry Francis II and Maria Anna Czernin-Chudenitz	15 February 1780 – 21 October 1794	Lordship of Bornstedt (at Dobříš)	Franz de Paula Gundaker von Colloredo-Mannsfeld; 6 January 1771; Prague eight children	21 October 1794; Vienna aged 67	Inherited the Bohemian properties, which were not subjected to the Salic Law, and passed them to her children, who adopted her surname, Mansfeld.
Dobříš inherited by the House of Colloredo-Mannsfeld

== Notable family members ==
- Peter Ernst I von Mansfeld-Vorderort (1517–1604), military commander in Spanish Habsburg service, governor of the Spanish Netherlands
- Gebhard I von Mansfeld-Vorderort (c. 1525 – 1562), his brother, Prince-elector and Archbishop of Cologne from 1558
- Karl von Mansfeld (1543–1595), legitimate son of Peter Ernst I, general during the Cologne War and the Ottoman–Habsburg wars
- Ernst von Mansfeld (c. 1580 – 1626), natural son of Peter Ernst I, military commander of the Protestant Union during the early years of the Thirty Years' War
- Philipp von Mansfeld (1589–1657), second-cousin of Ernst, commanded at first Swedish troops during the Thirty Years' War, from 1633 as Field Marshal of the Holy Roman Empire.
- Agnes von Mansfeld-Eisleben (1551–1637), wife of the Cologne Prince-Archbishop Gebhard Truchsess von Waldburg
- Heinrich Franz von Mansfeld (1640–1715), Prince of Fondi, Austrian diplomat, Field marshal and President of the Hofkriegsrat.

== See also ==
- Colloredo-Mansfeld
