= Karl von Mansfeld =

German general (1543–1595)

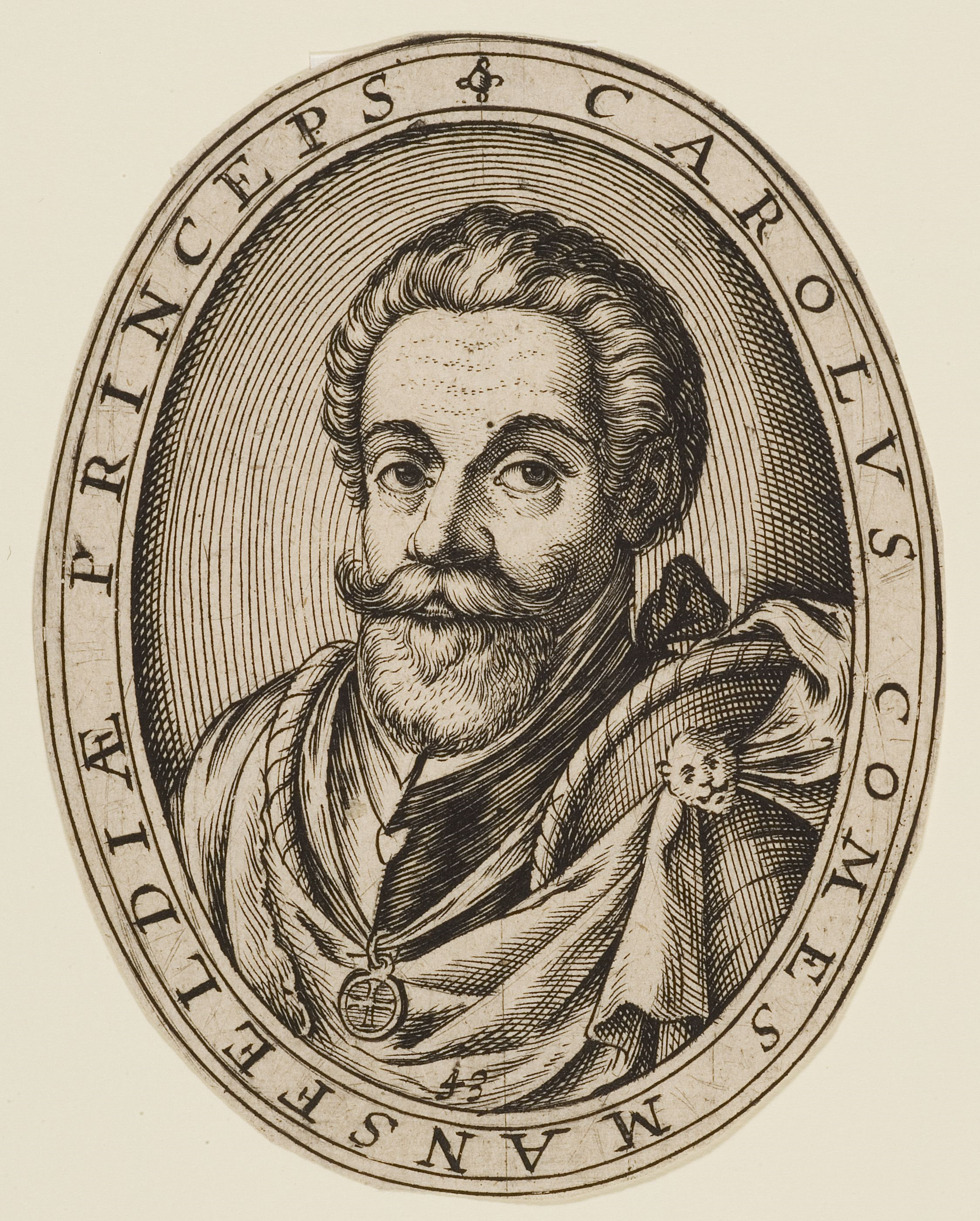
Portrait of Karl von Mansfeld, copper engraving by Abraham Hogenberg

Karl von Mansfeld (1543 – 24 August 1595) was an imperial general during the Cologne War and the Ottoman-Habsburg wars.

Von Mansfeld was the son of Count Peter Ernst I von Mansfeld-Vorderort, born in present-day Luxembourg, and was educated France. He entered the military of Philip II of Spain, and was appointed a general and an admiral in the navy of the Spanish Netherlands. He was sent to Hungary, where along with Count Mátyás Cseszneky he participated in the siege of Esztergom in 1595 during the Long War. He died shortly thereafter, probably of his wounds, Komárom.

== Family ==
He married twice, first to Diane de Cossé and, second, to Marie Christine von Egmond, who died 1622.

She had, from her second marriage, a son, Alexandre de Bournonville Duc de Bournonville, Comte de Henin-Lietard (born 14 September 1585, Brussels, died 21 March 1656), and, probably with Mansfeld, a second son, Antoine III de Lalaing (born between 1588 and 1590 and died 26 September 1613), Count of Hoogstraeten, who married Maria Margaretha de Berlaymont, daughter of Claude Berlaymont, also known as Haultpenne.

=== Siblings ===
From his father's first marriage on 1 April 1542 to Margaretha van Brederode (born c. 1520, died 31 May 1554);

- Friedrich, 1542–1559
- Polyxene, died after 17 September 1591; m. Palamedes von Nassau-Chalon (died 1600)

Step Siblings:

From his father's second marriage 22 February 1562 Marie de Montmorency (died 5 February 1570)

- Philipp Oktavian, 1564–1591
- Dorothea; m. Franz Verdugo

Natural Sibling [by Anna von Benzerath]

- Peter Ernst II von Mansfeld *1580, † near Sarajevo 29 November 1626

== Ancestors ==
Ancestors of Karl von Mansfeld

8. Albrecht V, Count of Mansfeld-Vorderort
4. Ernest II, Count of Mansfeld-Vorderort
9. Susanna of Bickenbach
2. Peter Ernst I von Mansfeld-Vorderort
10. Philip, Count of Solms-Lich
5. Dorothea of Solms-Lich
11. Adriana of Hanau-Münzenberg
1. Karl von Mansfeld-Vorderort
12. Walraven II van Brederode
6. Reinoud III van Brederode
13. Margaretha van Borselen
3. Margaretha van Brederode
14. Robert II de la Marck
7. Philippine de la Marck
15. Catherine of Croÿ
