= Ernest II of Mansfeld-Vorderort =

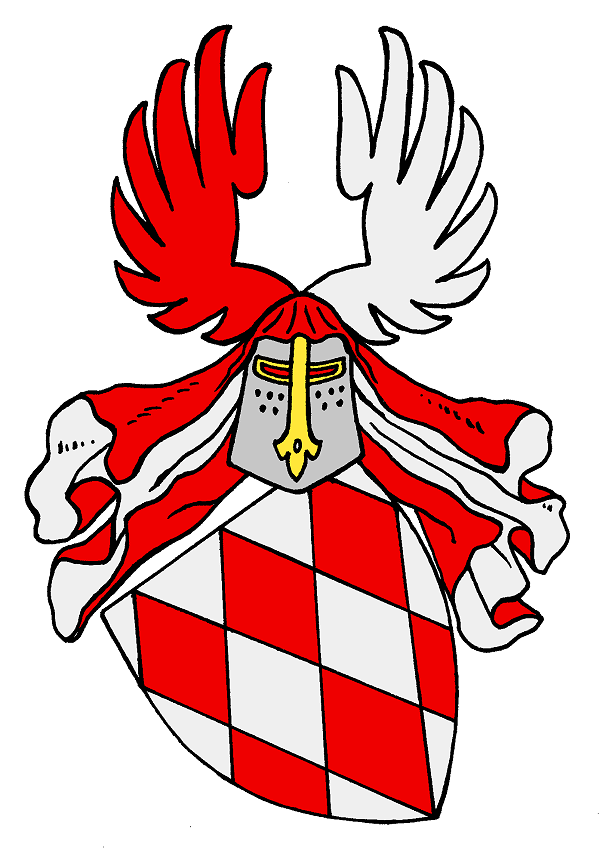
Coat of arms of the von Mansfeld family

Ernest II, Count of Mansfeld-Vorderort (6 December 1479 - 9 May 1531, Artern) was a German nobleman from the Mansfeld-Vorderort line of the House of Mansfeld. He was the fifth child and third son of Albert III (V), Count of Mansfeld, Lord in Mansfeld and Lord in Heldrungen (c.1450 - 3 December 1484, Leipzig) and succeeded him on his death.

His first marriage was in Stolberg in 1500 to Barbara von Querfurt (c 1485 - 23. January 1511), daughter of Bruno VII (IX), the last lord (Herr) of Querfurt, and his wife Brigitte zu Stolberg (1468–1518).

Ernest's second marriage was to Dorothea, Countess at Solms-Lich (25 January 1493 - 8 June 1578, Mansfeld), daughter of Philip, Count of Solms-Lich (1468) and his wife Adriana von Hanau-Münzenberg (1470–1524). Two of his children by his second marriage were the military commander Peter Ernst I von Mansfeld-Vorderort (1517-1604) and Elisabeth (ca. 1516–1541), briefly wife of Frederick, Hereditary Prince of Saxony.

He was buried in the St Andreas Kirche in Eisleben.

He is an ancestor of the Brazilian imperial family by the Empress Maria Leopoldina of Brazil.

== Bibliography (in German) ==
- D. Schwennicke: Europäische Stammtafeln. Neue Folge. Band XIX., Vittorio Klostermann Verlag, Frankfurt a. M. 2000, ISBN 3-465-03074-5.
- D. Schwennicke: Europäische Stammtafeln. Neue Folge. Band I.3, Vittorio Klostermann Verlag, Frankfurt a. M. 2000, ISBN 3-465-03060-5.
- Berthold Schmidt: Die Reußen. Genealogie des Gesamthauses Reuß älterer und jüngerer Linie, sowie der ausgestorbenen Vogtslinien zu Weida, Gera und Plauen und der Burggrafen zu Meißen aus dem Hause Plauen. Schleiz 1903.
- Ludwig Ferdinand Niemann: Geschichte der Grafen von Mansfeld mit drei lithografischen Abbildungen. Verlag Lorleberg, 1834. (online auf: books.google.de)
