= Albrecht VII von Mansfeld =

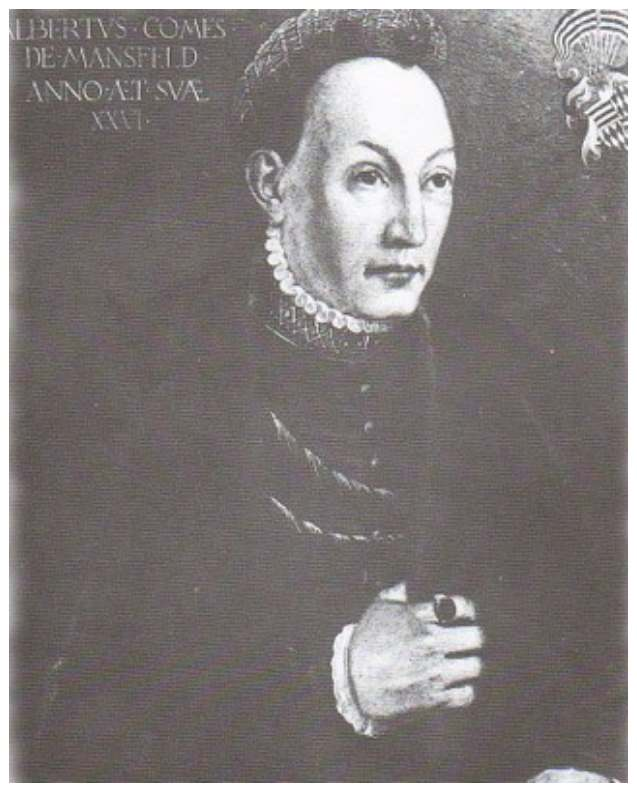

Albrecht VII (and III and IV), Count von Mansfeld-Hinterort (June 18, 1480 in Leipzig - March 4, 1560 in Neue Hütte in Leutenberg) was a German noble of the House of Mansfeld who was notable for his support of the Reformation.
