= Heygendorf =

- Ortsteil of Artern
- Interactive map of Heygendorf
- Location within Germany Location within Thuringia
- Coordinates: 51°21′N 11°22′E
- Country: Germany
- State: Thuringia
- District: Kyffhäuserkreis
- Town: Artern

Area
  - Total: 9.38 km^{2} (3.62 sq mi)
- Elevation: 122 m (400 ft)

Population (2018-12-31)
  - Total: 522
  - Density: 55.7/km^{2} (144/sq mi)
- Time zone: UTC+01:00 (CET)
  - Summer (DST): UTC+02:00 (CEST)
- Postal codes: 06556
- Dialling codes: 0 34 66

Heygendorf (German pronunciation: [ˈhaɪɡn̩ˌdɔʁf]) is a village and a former municipality in the district Kyffhäuserkreis, in Thuringia, Germany. Since 1 January 2019, it is part of the town Artern.
