= Artern Subcamp =

Nazi concentration subcamp

Coordinates: 51°21′50″N 11°18′28″E

The Artern Subcamp in Artern was a subcamp of the Nazi concentration camp Buchenwald.

From 20 November 1944 until 6 April 1945 the camp was used for approx. 250 male inmates (as of December 1944). This subcamp of Mittelbau-Dora was known as "Adorf" or "Rebstock neu" by the camp SS.
