= Hans Döring =

German painter

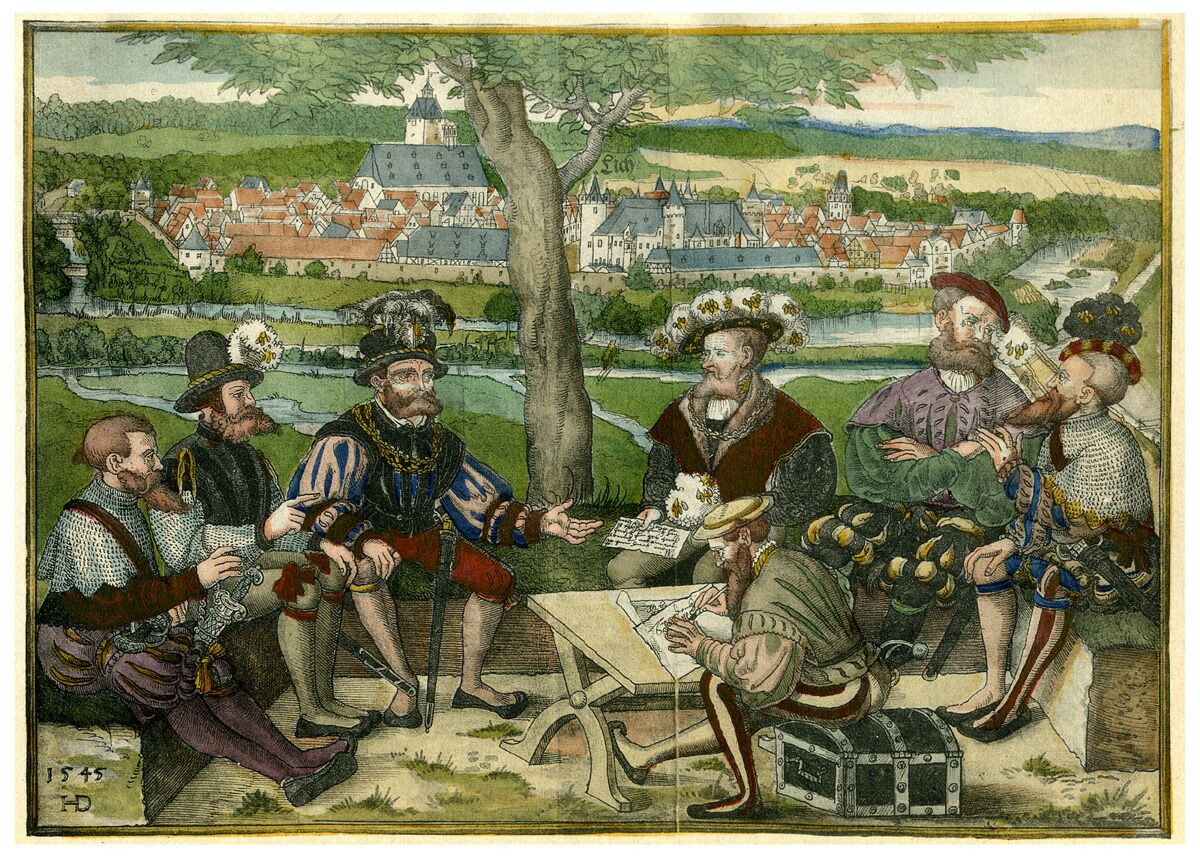
View of Lich from the south

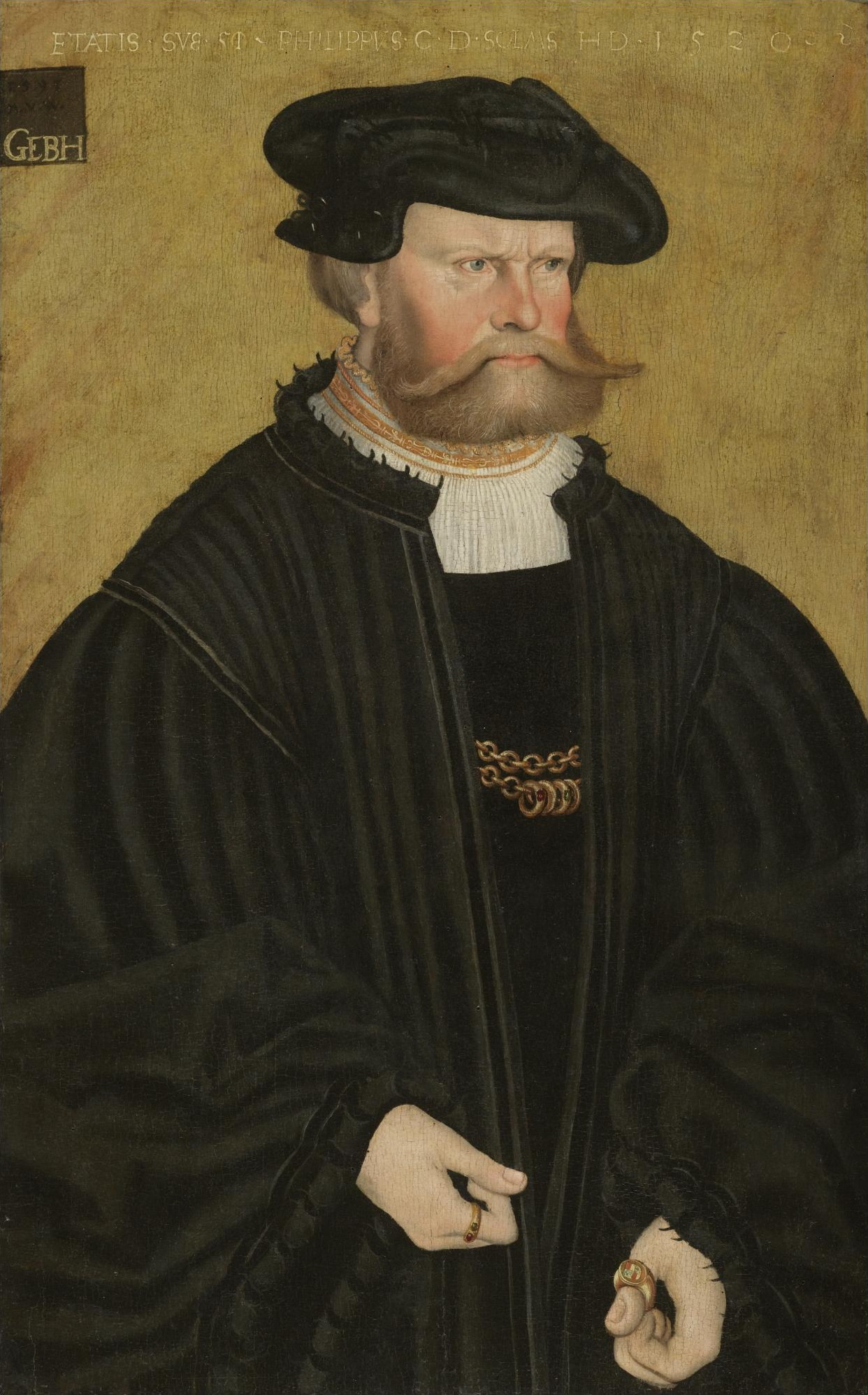
Bildnis Graf Phillip von Solms

Hans Döring (born Hans Ritter; c. 1490, Heustreu – 1558) was a German painter.

== Life ==
His coat of arms shows a mill and so he may have come from a family of millers. He appears in documents from 1499, 1503, and 1511 as a student matriculating at Erfurt and in 1511 at the University of Wittenberg. His first securely-provenanced painting also dates from 1511, a self-portrait with the initials "HD". He was the chief assistant of Lucas Cranach the Elder until the mid-1510s. His second known work is a painting of Lucretia from 1514, followed by altarpieces of 1515 and 1518 (including the Niederweidbach Altarpiece, which includes a self-portrait), portraits from the counts of Solms from 1515 onwards, and a 1527 portrait of the Ernest Count of Mansfeld and his wife Dorothea.

In 1523, he produced a wooden model for a kiln plate for casting the coat of arms of the House of Nassau. He seems to have been living in Wetzlar from around 1518, as in 1533 he was called upon to assist at the Marienstiftes church. By this time, he was a court painter to the houses of Nassau-Dillenburg and Solms. Döring also created woodcuts (mostly monogrammed) to illustrate the writings of Reinhard, Count von Solms-Lich, his war book of 1559–60, and may have created woodcarving designs for stove tiles.

== Bibliography ==
- Ehlers, Ernst Heinrich (1919). Hans Döring: Ein hessischer Maler des 16. Jahrhunderts (in German). Darmstadt: In Kommission bei J. Baer & Komp. in Frankfurt a. Main. doi:10.11588/diglit.25569. urn:nbn:de:bsz:16-diglit-255696.
- Mielke, Heinz-Peter (2015). Hans Döring (um 1483–1558): Im Schatten von Lukas Cranach d. Ä.; Studien zu einem Renaissancekünstler (in German). Bunsoh: Plejaden-Verlag.
