= Voigtstedt =

- Ortsteil of Artern
- Interactive map of Voigtstedt
- Location within Germany Location within Thuringia
- Coordinates: 51°22′32″N 11°18′37″E
- Country: Germany
- State: Thuringia
- District: Kyffhäuserkreis
- Town: Artern

Area
  - Total: 11.48 km^{2} (4.43 sq mi)
- Elevation: 125 m (410 ft)

Population (31 December 2018)
  - Total: 862
  - Density: 75.1/km^{2} (194/sq mi)
- Time zone: UTC+01:00 (CET)
  - Summer (DST): UTC+02:00 (CEST)
- Postal codes: 06556
- Dialling codes: 0 34 66
- Vehicle registration: KYF
- Website: www.voigtstedt.de

Voigtstedt (German pronunciation: [ˈfoːktʃtɛt]) is a village and a former municipality in the district Kyffhäuserkreis, in Thuringia, Germany. It is part of the town Artern since 1 January 2019.

Historical population
Year	Pop.	±%
1994	1,183	—
1998	1,133	−4.2%
2003	1,063	−6.2%
2008	993	−6.6%
2013	911	−8.3%
2018	862	−5.4%
Source: "Thüringer Landesamt für Statistik" (in German).
