= Mátyás Cseszneky de Milvány et Csesznek =

Hungarian magnate and cavalry commander

Count Mátyás Cseszneky de Milvány et Csesznek (ca. 1560 - early 17th century) was a Hungarian magnate and cavalry commander.

Mátyás Cseszneky was one of the bravest members of the Cseszneky family. He was a commander of a cavalry unit during the Long War (1591–1606) and fought together with Miklós Pálffy, Ferenc Révay and Karl Mansfeld. He played an important role in the occupation of Esztergom in 1595, and then in the recapture of Tata, Győr, Várgesztes, Veszprém, Várpalota, Tihany and of the ancient nestle of his family, Csesznek. Once when Tatars tried to attack the Christian forces around Esztergom, his unit not only repulsed the assault, but chased the Tatar troops, that outnumbered them, till Serbia. For his distinguished merits Cseszneky received several titles of nobility from King Rudolf.

== Sources ==
- Slachta bratislavskej stolice (ed. Pongrácz Denis, Stresnák Gábor, Ragac Radoslav, Tandlich T.)
- Frederik Federmayer: Zbierka erbových pečatí
- Cseszneky család
