= Ernst von Mansfeld =

German noble and military commander (c. 1580–1626)

Graf von Mansfeld
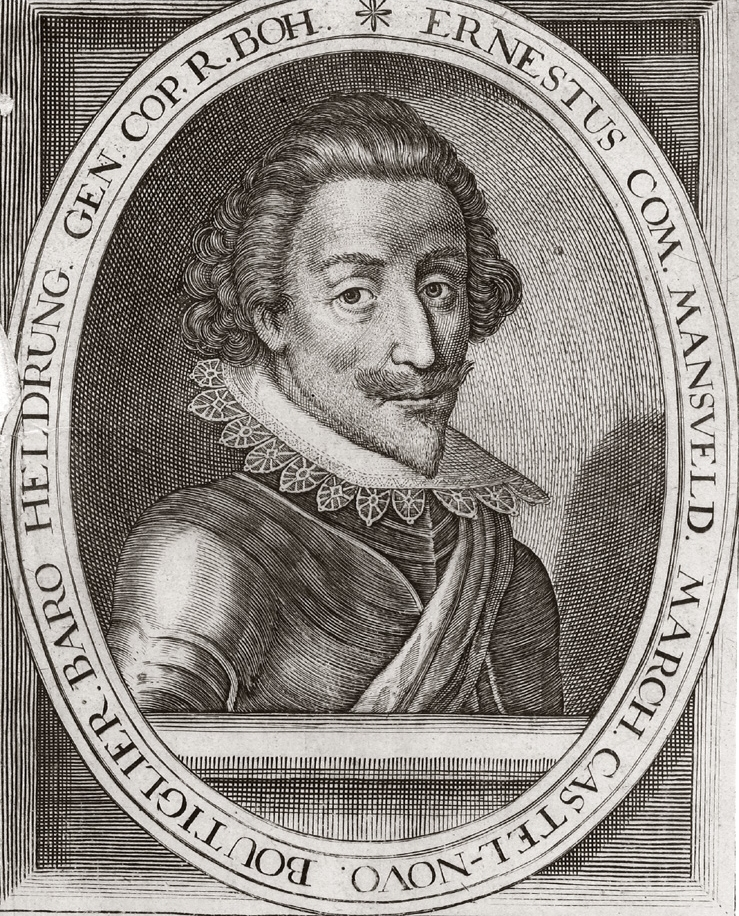
- Born: c. 1580; Luxembourg, Spanish Netherlands
- Died: 29 November 1626 (aged c. 46); Rakovica, Bosnia, Ottoman Empire
- Years active: 1595–1626
- Father: Peter Ernst I von Mansfeld-Vorderort

Peter Ernst Graf von Mansfeld (c. 1580 – 29 November 1626), or simply Ernst von Mansfeld, was a German military commander. Despite being a Catholic, he fought for the Protestants during the early years of the Thirty Years' War. He was one of the leading mercenary generals of the early war.

== Biography ==
Ernst was an illegitimate son of Count Peter Ernst von Mansfeld (1517–1604) by Anna von Benzerath. His father was a member of the House of Mansfeld and royal Spanish stadtholder, while his mother belonged to a significantly lower nobility. All three children born into this liaison were legitimated when his parents subsequently married on 28 February 1591 in Brussels. He was raised in the Catholic faith at his father's palace in Luxembourg.

He gained his earliest military experiences during the Long War in Hungary, where his elder half-brother Charles (1543–1595), also a soldier of renown, held a high command in the imperial army. While his brother succumbed to an epidemic within short time, young Ernst stayed at the theatre of war for several years. In the War of the Jülich Succession he served under Archduke Leopold V of Austria, until that prince's ingratitude, real or fancied, drove him into the arms of the enemies of the House of Habsburg. Although he remained a Roman Catholic, from about 1610 he openly allied himself with the Protestant princes, and during the earlier part of the Thirty Years' War he was one of their foremost champions. In 1615-1617 he took part in the Uskok War.

He was despatched by Charles Emmanuel, Duke of Savoy, at the head of about 2,000 men to aid the revolting Bohemians when war broke out in 1618. He took Pilsen, but in the summer of 1619 he was defeated at the Battle of Sablat; after this he offered his services to the Emperor Ferdinand II and remained inactive while the titular king of Bohemia, Frederick V, Elector Palatine of the Rhine, was driven in headlong rout from Prague. Mansfeld, however, was soon appointed by Frederick to command his army in Bohemia, and in 1621 he took up his position in the Upper Palatinate, successfully resisting the efforts made by Tilly to dislodge him.

From the Upper Palatinate, he passed into the Rhenish Palatinate. Here he relieved Frankenthal and took Hagenau; then, joined by his commander, the elector Frederick, he defeated Tilly at Wiesloch (25 April 1622) and plundered Alsace and Hesse. However, Mansfeld's ravages were not confined to the lands of his enemies; they were ruinous to the districts he was commissioned to defend. At length, Frederick dismissed Mansfeld's troops from his service. With Christian of Brunswick the count then entered the service of the United Provinces and marched to the Republic through the Spanish Netherlands. In August 1622, at Fleurus his army had to fight its way through a Spanish attempt to block him. His army recuperated and reequipped in September and then marched with the Dutch army to relieve the city of Bergen op Zoom, besieged by Spain. After that, he took up his quarters in East Frisia, capturing fortresses and inflicting great hardships upon the inhabitants. A mercenary and a leader of mercenaries, Mansfeld often interrupted his campaigns by journeys made for the purpose of raising money, or in other words of selling his services to the highest bidder, and in these diplomatic matters he showed considerable skill.

About 1624 he paid three visits to London, where he was hailed as a hero by the populace, and at least one to Paris. James I, being the father-in-law of Frederick V, Elector Palatine, was anxious to furnish him with men and money for the recovery of the Palatinate, but it was not until January 1625 that Mansfeld and his army of "raw and poor rascals" sailed from Dover to the Netherlands before failing to relieve the siege of Breda. Later in the year, the Thirty Years' War having been renewed under the leadership of Christian IV of Denmark, he re-entered Germany to take part therein but on 25 April 1626 Wallenstein inflicted a severe defeat upon him at the bridge of Dessau. Mansfeld, however, quickly raised another army, with which he intended to attack the hereditary lands of the house of Austria, and pursued by Wallenstein he pressed forward towards Hungary, where he hoped to accomplish his purpose by the aid of Bethlen Gábor, prince of Transylvania but when Bethlen changed his policy and made peace with the emperor, Mansfeld was compelled to disband his troops. Already weakened by ill health, he set out for Venice, but when he reached Rakovica near Sarajevo, in Bosnia, he took a turn for the worse and died on 29 November 1626, of natural causes. According to one account, Mansfeld, knowing his end was near, donned his armour and propped by two of his soldiers he gave a farewell speech to his remaining followers and died at sunrise while standing up. He was buried in Split.

== Sources ==
- Endnotes:
  - F. Stieve, Ernst von Mansfeld (Munich, 1890)
  - R. Reuss, Graf Ernst von Mansfeld im böhmischen Kriege (Brunswick, 1865)
  - A. C. de Villermont, Ernest de Mansfeldt (Brussels, 1866)
  - L. Graf Uetterodt zu Scharfenberg, Ernst Graf zu Mansfeld (Gotha; 1867)
  - J. Grossmann, Des Grafen Ernst von Mansfeld letzte Pläne und Thaten (Breslau, 1870)
  - E. Fischer, Des Mansfelders Tod (Berlin, 1878)
  - S. R. Gardiner, History of England, vols. iv. and v. (1901);
  - J. L. Motley, Life and Death of John of Barneveld (ed. 1904; vol. ii)
