= Peter Ernst I von Mansfeld-Vorderort =

German soldier in Spanish service (1517–1604)

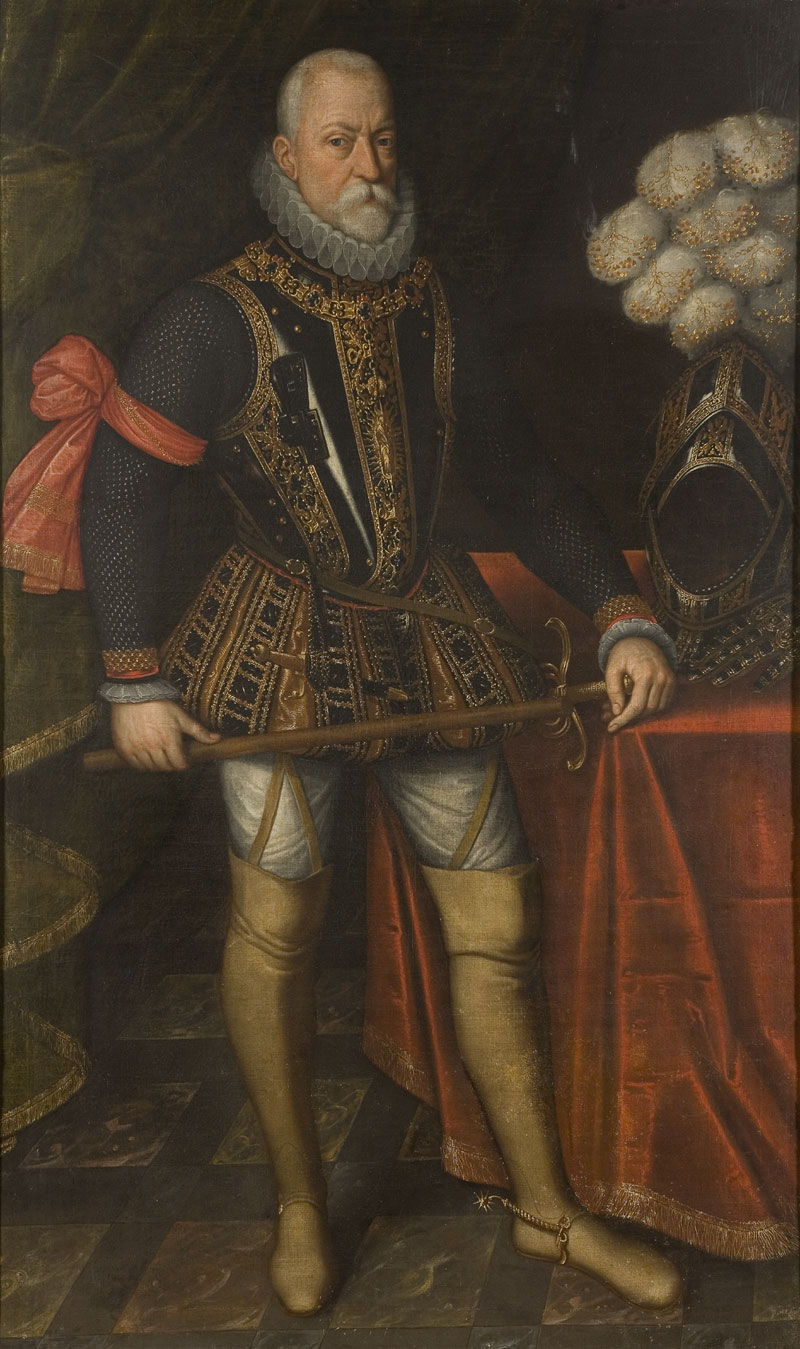
Peter Ernst I von Mansfeld painted by Antonio Moro.

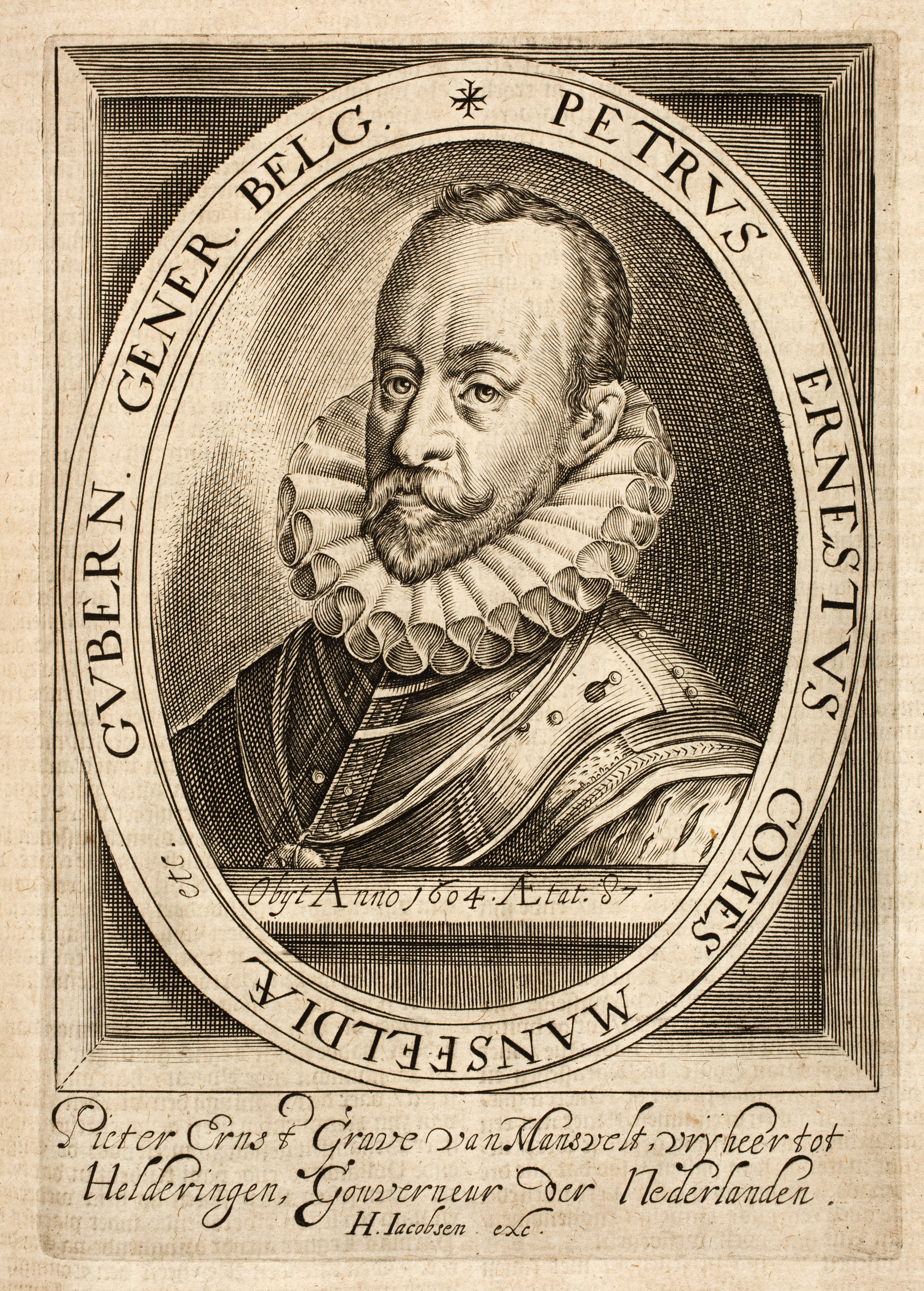
Engraving of Peter Ernst I

Peter Ernst I von Mansfeld-Vorderort (20 July 1517 – 25 May 1604) was a Spanish Imperial army commander of German origin and Governor of the Spanish Netherlands from 1592 to 1594.

Born in Heldrungen, Saxony, he was the 11th child (of 16) of Ernest II, Count of Mansfeld-Vorderort. His mother was Ernest II's second wife, Dorothea von Solms-Lich.

== Military career ==
As a young man, Peter Ernst came to the Spanish Netherlands with Charles V. He participated in the expedition against Tunis in 1535 and became governor of Luxembourg in 1545. He was made a knight in the Order of the Golden Fleece in 1546.

In the Eighty Years' War, he took part in combat under John of Austria, the illegitimate half-brother of King Philip II of Spain and Alexander Farnese, cousin on his mother's side. He fought amongst others in the Battle of Gembloux (1578).

When Farnese invaded France in 1590, Mansfeld was appointed Governor ad interim of the Spanish Netherlands. When Farnese died in 1592, Von Mansfeld effectively became governor until Archduke Ernest of Austria took over in 1594.

== Descendants ==
His first marriage (1 April 1542) to Margaretha van Brederode (*ca. 1520 – died Nemours, 31 May 1554), daughter of Reinoud III van Brederode 11th Lord of Brederode and Philippine de La Marck, produced:

- Friedrich, * 1542, † 1559
- Karl II, Count von Mansfeld zu Friedeburg (Luxembourg, 1545 – † siege of Gran (Esztergom), 14 August 1596); 1m: Diane de Cossé; 2m: Marie Christine von Egmond († 1622)
- Polyxene, died after 17 September 1591, married Palamedes de Châlon, the illegitimate son of René of Châlon.

His second marriage on 22 February 1562 to Marie de Montmorency (died 5 February 1570) produced:

- Philipp Oktavian, 1564–1591
- Dorothea, married Spanish General and Admiral Francisco Verdugo.

A liaison with Anna von Benzerath resulted in

- Peter Ernst II von Mansfeld, who was his best-known descendant; Ernst was an important army commander in the Thirty Years War.

He died in Clausen, Luxembourg in 1604.

Government offices
Preceded by Alexander Farnese	Governor of the Habsburg Netherlands; 1592–1594	Succeeded by Archduke Ernest of Austria
