= German Prince =

Member of German royalty or aristocracy

The terms German Prince or German Princess are often used to refer to members of royalty that were from a German state. Today Germany is one nation, but until 1914, Germany and Central Europe were ruled over by a large number of independent states. Until World War I, the term German could have referred to peoples from areas of what is today the states Germany, Poland, Belgium, Luxembourg, Czech Republic, Slovakia, Austria, and even Croatia, and the Netherlands. From 1815 to 1860 this number was 35 separate German sovereign states (including Prussia and Austria) plus another 4 free cities, who together formed the German Confederation. Prior to 1789 there were over 300 independent sovereign states and thousands of other bishoprics, lordships, and free cities that made up the Holy Roman Empire.

== Why use Germans? ==
When the term German Prince or Princess is used, it is referring to a member of one of the many ruling sovereign houses of the region of Central Europe. They were often used as suitable marriage candidates for royalty, simply due to the fact there were so many of them. Also, as all of the European royalty were related, it helped to use a German prince/princess to keep the marriage "in the family", so to speak, or sometimes the opposite: to broaden the gene pool. The only other area of Europe that was close to be being ruled over by so many different sovereign states was Italy which after 1815 was made up of at least 11 different states, with the rest of Europe being ruled over by large states.

== Examples ==
- King George I was a German Prince, the Elector of Hanover, before and after he became King of Great Britain.
- Queen Mary of United Kingdom, queen consort of King George V. She was originally the Princess of Teck, a small principality in Württemberg, and was married in 1893.
- Queen Caroline of United Kingdom, queen consort of George IV. She was originally the Princess of Brunswick-Wolfenbüttel, and married her first cousin in 1795.
- Empress Catherine II of Russia, better known as Catherine the Great. She was born Princess Sophia Augusta Frederica of Anhalt-Zerbst, from Stettin in Prussia, marrying the future Emperor Peter III of Russia in 1745. In 1762, she replaced her husband as ruler of Russia, after a bloodless palace coup.
- Queen Anne Catherine of Denmark and Norway, queen consort of King Christian IV of Denmark. She was originally Anne Catherine of Brandenburg, in 1597 marrying King Christian IV, becoming Queen.
