= Mansfeld Castle =

Coordinates: 51°35′38″N 11°27′29″E

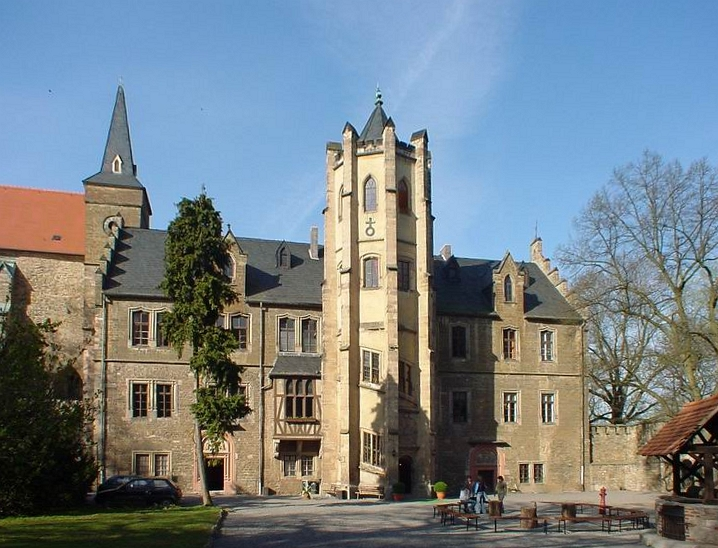
Mansfeld Castle

Mansfeld Castle (German: Schloss Mansfeld) is a castle in the region of Mansfeld Land in Saxony-Anhalt, Germany. The castle, which is surrounded by forest, stands on top of a large rock overlooking the town of Mansfeld. The Late Gothic church of the castle, as well as the ruins, moats and the remains of the battlements from the time of the old fortress make Mansfeld castle a popular attraction. Martin Luther often visited the castle, as his parents lived in Mansfeld. His father worked in the local copper mine, while Luther himself attended the school of Mansfeld.

Mansfeld Castle is now used as a Jugendburg, or Christian youth education and conference centre.

== History ==
- 1229: first documented mention of Mansfeld Castle.
- 1509: fire destroyed the castle.
- 1509 - ca. 1549: building of three Renaissance style castles (Vorderort, Mittelort, Hinterort) and a fortress (one of the largest in Germany), furnishing of the castle's church.
- 1540: introduction of the Protestant Reformation to the County of Mansfeld by Martin Luther and Count Albert of Mansfeld-Hinterort.
- 1570: the count's property is under administration because of his massive debt, the castles Mittelort and Hinterort fall into decay.
- 1618 - 1648: repeated siege of the castle during the Thirty Years' War.
- 1672: Saxon government decides to destroy the fortress.
- 1674/75: The fortress is razed to the ground by 400 countrymen and 30 miners from Freiberg, Saxony.
- 1710: Count John George III of Mansfeld, the count that lived in Mansfeld Castle, dies.
- 1780: After the death of Johann Wenzel Nepomuk, the last heir of the line of counts of Mansfeld, the castle is owned by the Kingdom of Prussia.
- 1794 - 1810: The castle is owned by Carl Friedrich Bückling, developer of the first German steam-powered machine.
- 1859 - 1945: Mansfeld Castle is owned by the barons von der Recke.
- 1860 - 1862: Neogothic remodelling and renovation of Mansfeld Castle.
- 1883 - 1908: fitting of Neogothic windows and pews to the castle church, which can still be seen today.
- 1946: After the act of reforming landed property, the state of Saxony-Anhalt takes ownership of the castle.
- 1947: The castle is handed over to the Protestant church of Saxony for free of charge use by the YMCA.
- 1997: The society Förderverein Schloss Mansfeld e. V., founded on 24 May in Halle an der Saale, supports Mansfeld Castle.

== See also ==
- Dorothea of Mansfeld
