= Schraplau =

- Town
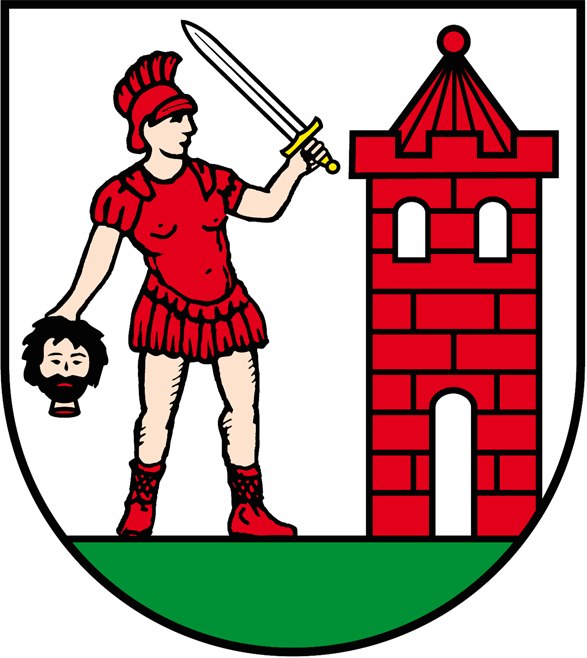
- Coat of arms

- Location of Schraplau within Saalekreis district
- Interactive map of Schraplau
- Location within Germany Location within Saxony-Anhalt
- Coordinates: 51°26′11″N 11°39′54″E
- Country: Germany
- State: Saxony-Anhalt
- District: Saalekreis
- Municipal assoc.: Weida-Land
- Subdivisions: 2

Government
  - Mayor (2019–26): Olaf Maury

Area
  - Total: 7.05 km^{2} (2.72 sq mi)
- Elevation: 116 m (381 ft)

Population (2025-12-31)
  - Total: 1,001
  - Density: 142/km^{2} (368/sq mi)
- Time zone: UTC+01:00 (CET)
  - Summer (DST): UTC+02:00 (CEST)
- Postal codes: 06279
- Dialling codes: 034774
- Vehicle registration: SK

Schraplau is a town in the Verbandsgemeinde Weida-Land, part of the district of Saalekreis, in the State of Sachsen-Anhalt, Germany. It is situated approximately 8 km (5 mi) northeast of Querfurt. It is also considered part of the Halle-Leipzig metropolitan area.

== History ==
The village of Scrabanloch was founded in the 8th century, the exact year remains unknown. Soon after, a castle was built near the settlement. In the 11th century the village received a charter to become a city. Over the time Schraplau has had several names.

== Town structure ==
Schraplau includes Wilhelm-Fichte-Siedlung as well as the neighborhoods of Trautmanshoehe and Schafsee which are also incorporated but lie outside of the main urbanisation.

== Politics ==
The incumbent mayor is Olaf Maury, who was elected in February 2019.

== Education ==
Schraplau retains a public elementary school.

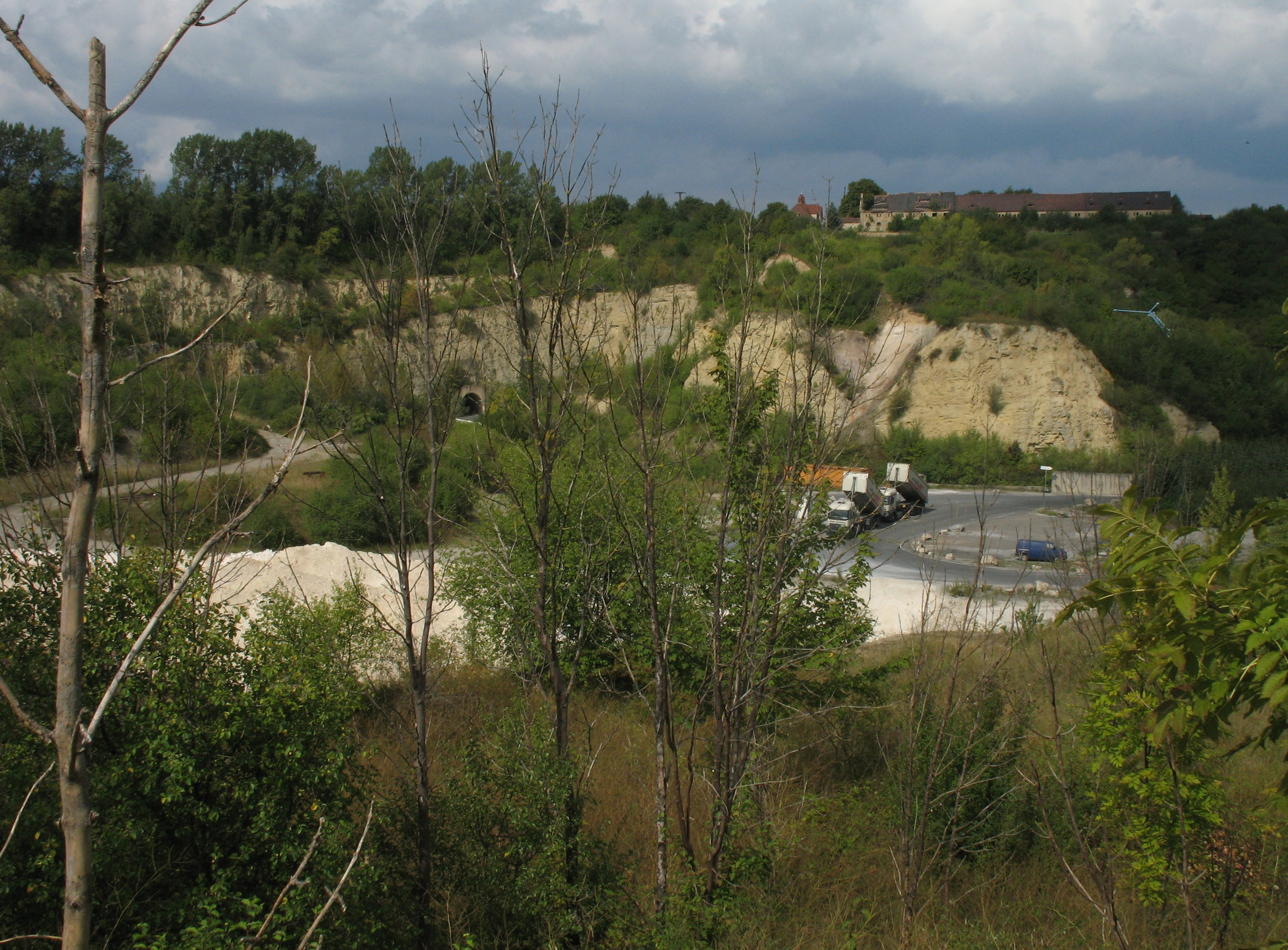
Limestone quarry

== Economy ==
Most residents are not employed in Schraplau itself. Notable employers and important service businesses in the town are the Kalkwerk (lime work plant) and the Trink- und Abwasserzweckverband (water works). There is also a bakery, a drug store, and a public house.

== Recreation ==
Schraplau offers a number of green parks and avenues for walking and cycling. A sports stadium is open to everyone and suitable for soccer and other sports. There is also a small church. A public pool, which was built in the 1950s, was renovated in 1994.

== Infrastructure ==
The town is served by public buses of the Mitteldeutscher Verkehrsverbund, that connect Schraplau with train stations in Röblingen am See and Querfurt. From Querfurt trains leave for Merseburg, from Röblingen am See for Halle and Nordhausen. The nearest motorway is the new Bundesautobahn 38 Göttingen–Leipzig, which has an exit 3 km (2 mi) south of Schraplau. The railway tracks running through Schraplau are no longer used for public transport and are now only occasionally used for the transport of heavy goods.
