= Philip, Count of Solms-Lich =

Count of Solms-Lich, patron of the arts and architecture

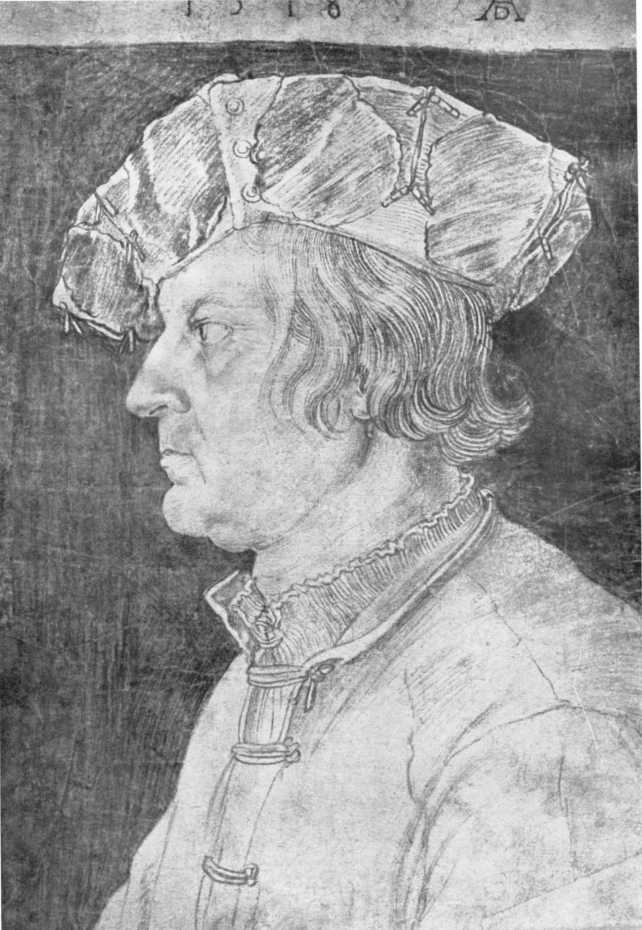
Drawing of Philip made by Albrecht Dürer in 1518 during that year's Diet of Augsburg.

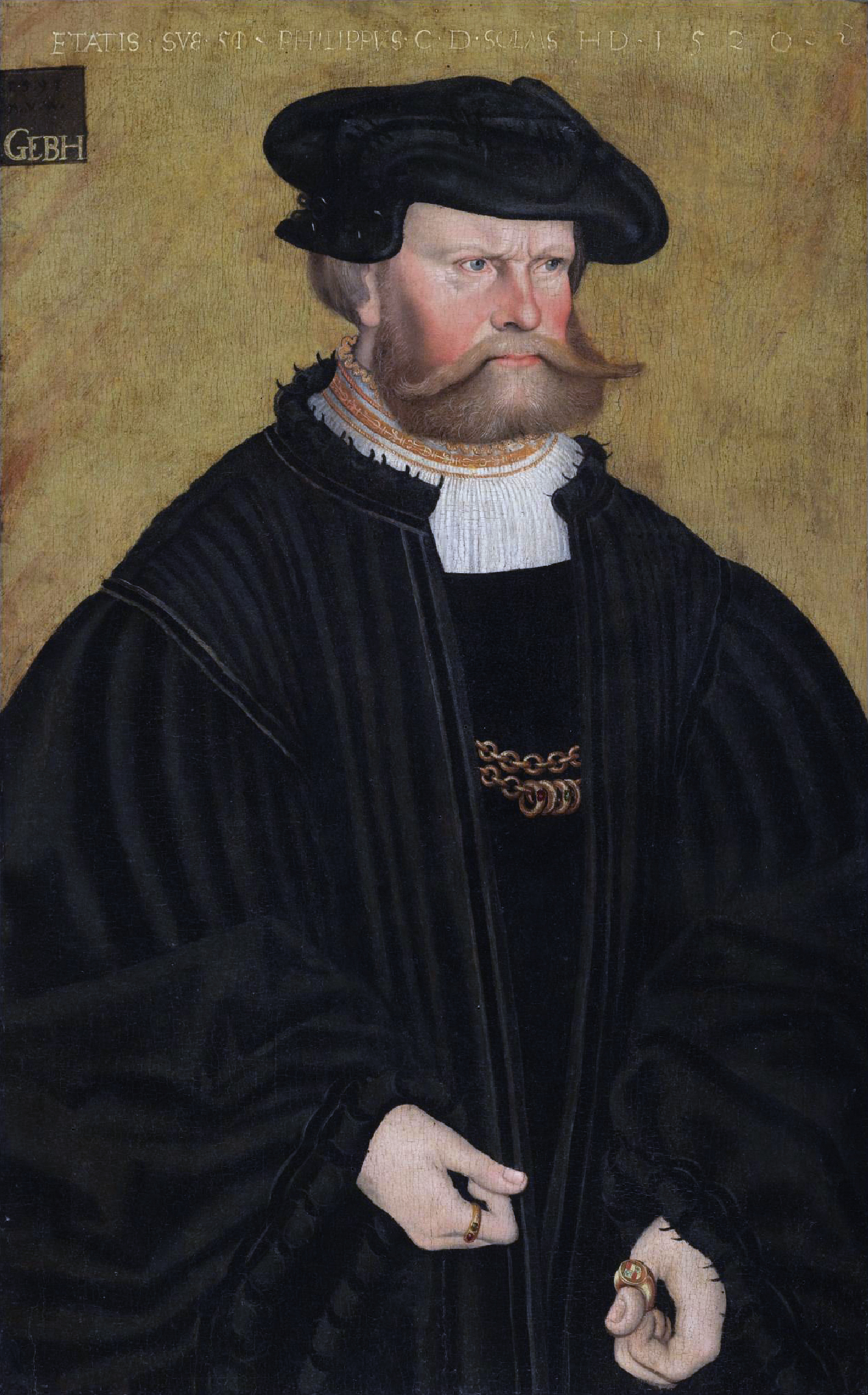
Philip by Hans Döring.

Philipp, Count of Solms-Lich (15 August 1468 - 3 October 1544, Frankfurt) was a German nobleman. He ruled as Count of Solms zu Lich. He was also a councilor at the courts of Maximilian I, Charles V and Frederick III, as well as a patron of art and architecture.

== Life ==
He was the son of Kuno of Solms-Lich and Walpurgis of Dhaun-Kyrburg and a younger brother of John of Solms. He studied in Mainz, Heidelberg and Erfurt.

On 15 February 1489 he married Adriana of Hanau (1 May 1470 - 12 April 1524), a daughter of Philipp I, Count of Hanau-Münzenberg and his wife Adriana of Nassau-Siegen. They were related (albeit distantly) and so the marriage required a papal dispensation. The marriage contract stipulated a 5,000 florin dowry with an additional 'widerlage' of 6,000 florins and a 'morgengabe' of 1,000 florins - Philip had some difficulty raising the sum and it was only in 1506 that she received her dowry.

As a councilor at the Imperial court, he strengthened his claims on his lands - in 1494 he was freed from the judgement of the Reichshofgericht or high imperial court. He was also exempted from appearing before all other courts and by so doing the emperor gave up his last rights in the county of Solms-Lich. He probably moved to become a councilor at the court of Frederick III between 1506 and 1514 - there he met the painter Hans Döring, who he made his official painter. He was also drawn by Durer in 1518 and painted by Lucas Cranach the Elder in 1520.

The rebuilding of the Burg Hohensolm around this time was probably undertaken by Philip, whilst he also built a residence at Lich. He, the Landgrave of Hesse and the bishop of Trier were probably the builders of the Marienkirche in Niederweidbach (now a district of Bischoffen) - he paid for the church's altar and he and his family were painted on its donation board, probably by Döring. In 1510 he began rebuilding the Marienstiftskirche in Lich.

On Frederick's behalf Philip concluded a marriage contract between John Frederick and Charles V's sister Katharina in 1519, but the plan failed. In 1520 he and Franz von Sickingen joined forces to protect Martin Luther from possible arrest. Via Ulrich von Hutten, Sickingen asserted Luther's protection and Philip may have offered a safe overnight stay to Luther en route to the 1521 Diet of Worms. After Frederick's death Philip entered the service of Philip I, Landgrave of Hesse. Philip was made ruler of Sonnewalde in Lower Lusatia in 1537 and of Alt-Pouch in 1544. However, he remained Catholic for political reasons when the Landgrave converted to Lutheranism, backing the Holy Roman Emperor on the question of the Augsburg Confession, though he is said to have converted to Lutheranism on his deathbed. He was buried in Lich.

== Children ==
- Walpurgis (1490–1527)
- Reinhard (1491–1562), founder of Solms-Hohensolms-Lich line
- Dorothea (1493–1578)
- Anna (1494–1510)
- Otto I (1496–1522), founder of Solms-Laubach line
- Ursula (1498–1517)

== Bibliography (in German) ==
- Friedrich Battenberg (Bearb.): Solmser Urkunden. Regesten zu den Urkundenbeständen und Kopiaren der Grafen und Fürsten von Solms im Staatsarchiv Darmstadt (Abt. B 9 und F 24 B), im gräflichen Archiv zu Laubach und im fürstlichen Archiv zu Lich 1131–1913 = Repertorien des Hessischen Staatsarchivs Darmstadt 15. Bände 1-4: Urkundenregesten Nr. 1-5035, ISBN 3-88443-224-9, 225-7, 227-3 und 232-X; Band 5: Nachträge (Urkundenregesten Nr. 5306-5318), Corrigenda und Indices. 1981–1986. XXIV, 437, 348, 408. 409, 579 S. ISBN 3-88443-235-4
- Frank Rudolph: Solms-Lich, Philipp von. In: Biographisch-Bibliographisches Kirchenlexikon (BBKL). Band 28, Bautz, Nordhausen 2007, ISBN 978-3-88309-413-7, Sp. 1259–1263.
- Reinhard Suchier: Genealogie des Hanauer Grafenhauses. In: Festschrift des Hanauer Geschichtsvereins zu seiner fünfzigjährigen Jubelfeier am 27. August 1894, Hanau 1894.
- Friedrich Uhlhorn: Reinhard Graf zu Solms Herr zu Münzenberg 1491–1562. Marburg 1952.
