= Artern =

- Town
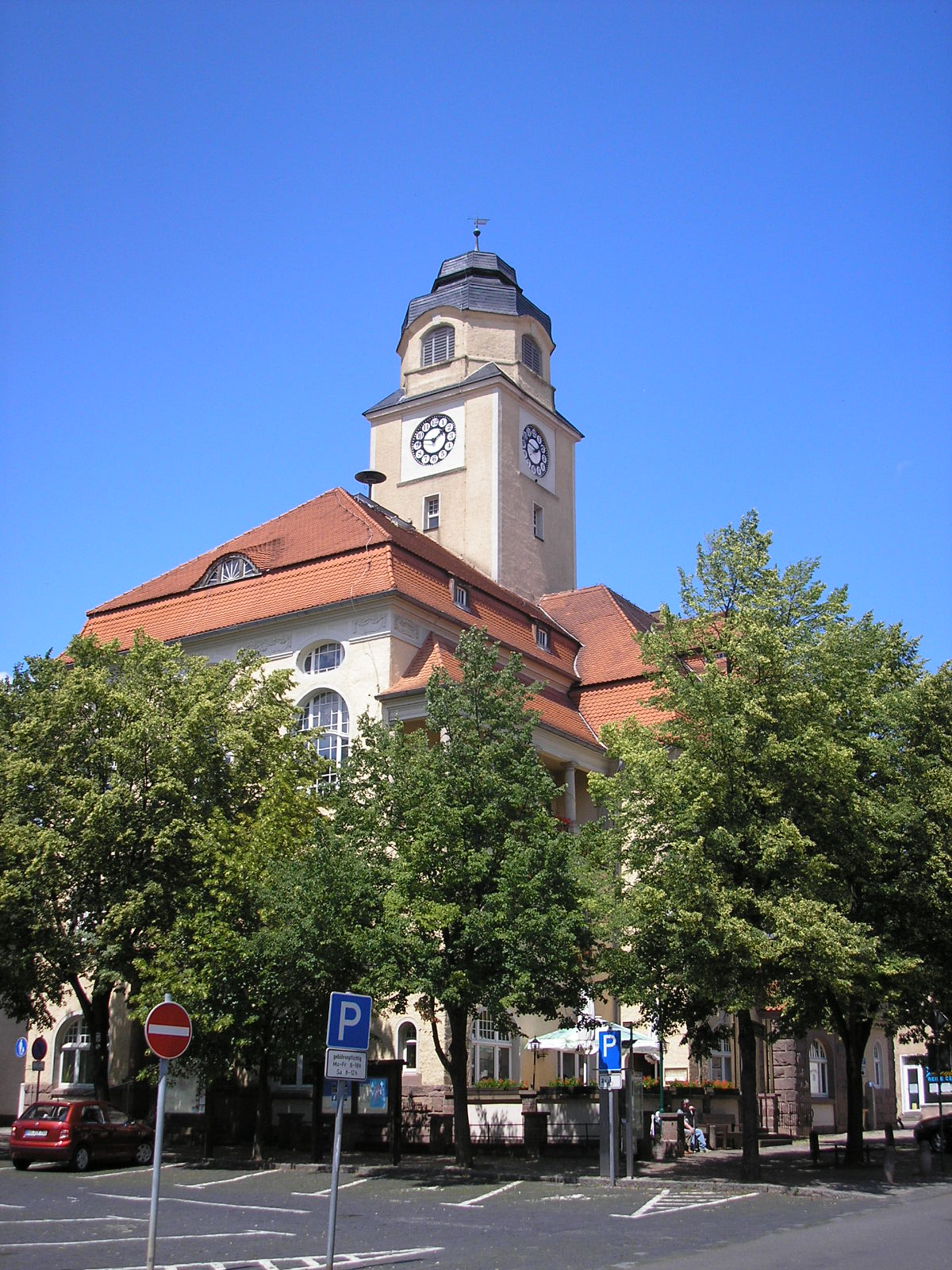
- Town hall

- Coat of arms

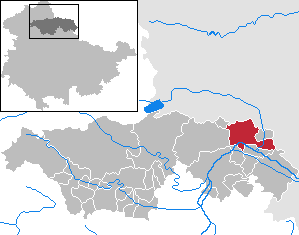
- Location of Artern within Kyffhäuserkreis district
- Interactive map of Artern
- Location within Germany Location within Thuringia
- Coordinates: 51°22′N 11°18′E
- Country: Germany
- State: Thuringia
- District: Kyffhäuserkreis
- Subdivisions: 3

Government
  - Mayor (2026–32): Wolfgang von Eye

Area
  - Total: 45.05 km^{2} (17.39 sq mi)
- Elevation: 121 m (397 ft)

Population (2025-12-31)
  - Total: 6,462
  - Density: 143.4/km^{2} (371.5/sq mi)
- Time zone: UTC+01:00 (CET)
  - Summer (DST): UTC+02:00 (CEST)
- Postal codes: 06556
- Dialling codes: 03466
- Vehicle registration: KYF, ART, SDH
- Website: www.artern.de

Artern (German pronunciation: [ˈaʁtɐn]) is a town in the Kyffhäuserkreis district, Thuringia, Germany. The former municipalities Heygendorf and Voigtstedt were merged into Artern in January 2019.

== Geography ==
Artern is situated at the confluence of the rivers Unstrut and Helme, on a bend of the Unstrut, which flows through the town from the southeast to the northwest.

It is located in the north east of Thuringia, close to the border with Saxony Anhalt, and 12 km south of Sangerhausen.

== Transport ==
Artern is on the Sangerhausen–Erfurt railway and so has railway connections to Erfurt and Sangerhausen. The railway connection to Naumburg was cancelled in December 2006. The population was 6,165 in the 2006 census.

== History ==
The first known documented mention of Artern was as Aratora in the early 9th Century, in a register of estates at Hersfeld Abbey. The water castle of Artern was built in the 10th Century by a local noble Thietmarus Kohlstedt.

Machinery, sugar and boots used to be manufactured in Artern.

Its brine springs, known as early as the 15th century, are still frequented.

In 1944 a subcamp, Rebstock neu, of the Nazi concentration camp Buchenwald was established in Artern.

During World War II, 47 prisoners of war from Poland and France were used as forced labourers at the Weidlich Manor, on the Demesne, and on the river works. Over 400 foreign forced labourers were working in the machine factory Kyffhäuserhütte in 1941. At least another 1,124 forced labourers, predominantly from the Soviet Union, worked in the sugar factory, the brewery, the saline works, on the railways and on farms (also in the nearby village of Schönfeld) and in the outlying estate Kachstedt.

In the Artern subcamp (with cover name A-Dorf) of the concentration camp Mittelbau-Dora, hundreds of prisoners, also from other camps, had to assemble the electrics for V2 rockets. In April 1945 hundreds of concentration camp prisoners were sent on various routes on death marches. The numerous fatalities of the forced labour and the last deportations were buried in the Parkfriedhof cemetery, where a memorial stone was erected, which was removed in 1975.

On 12 April 1945 Artern was occupied by the US Army, and in July of the same year by the Red Army. With this it became part of the Soviet occupation zone and later East Germany.

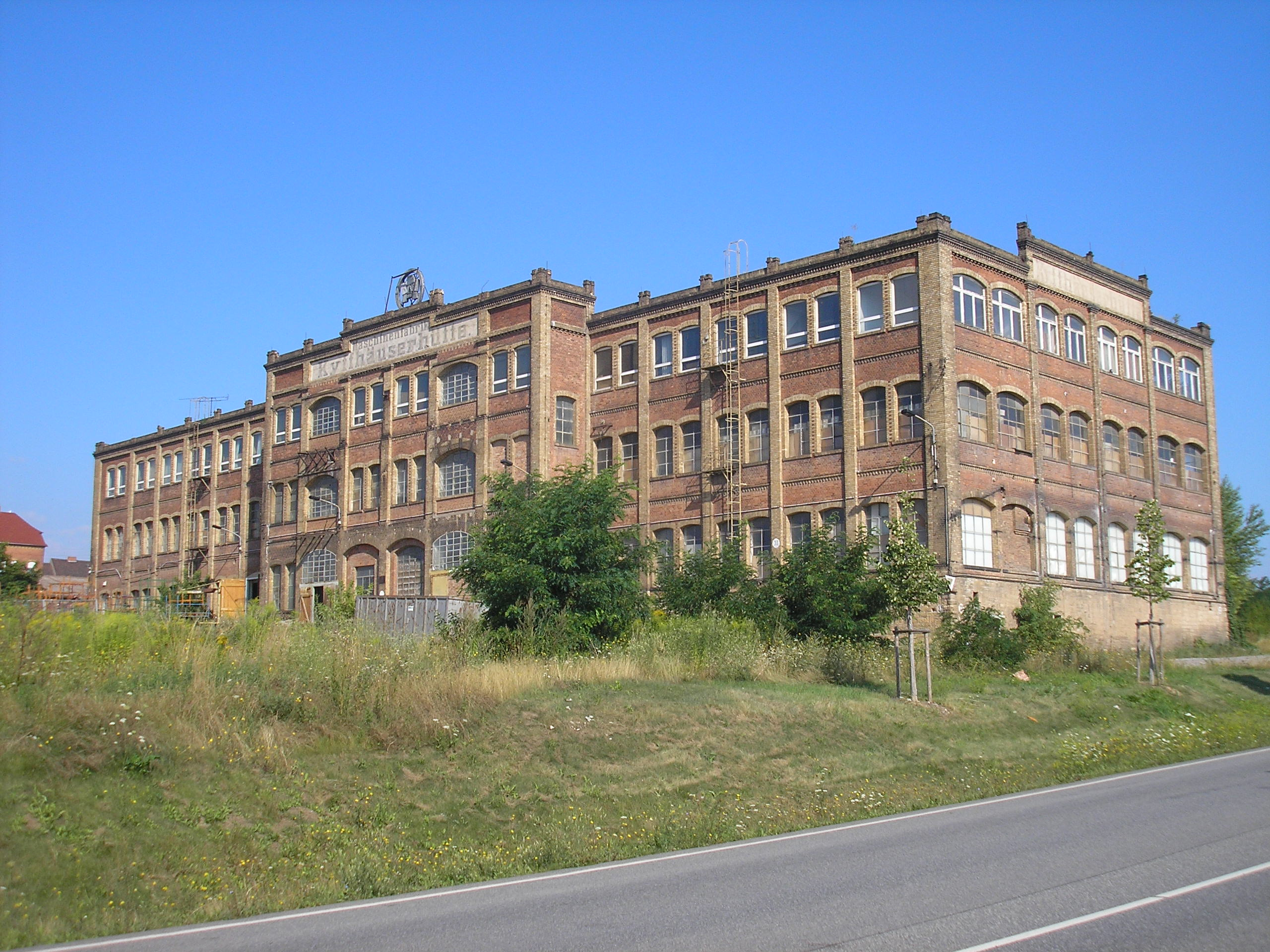
Former machine factory Kyffhäuserhütte

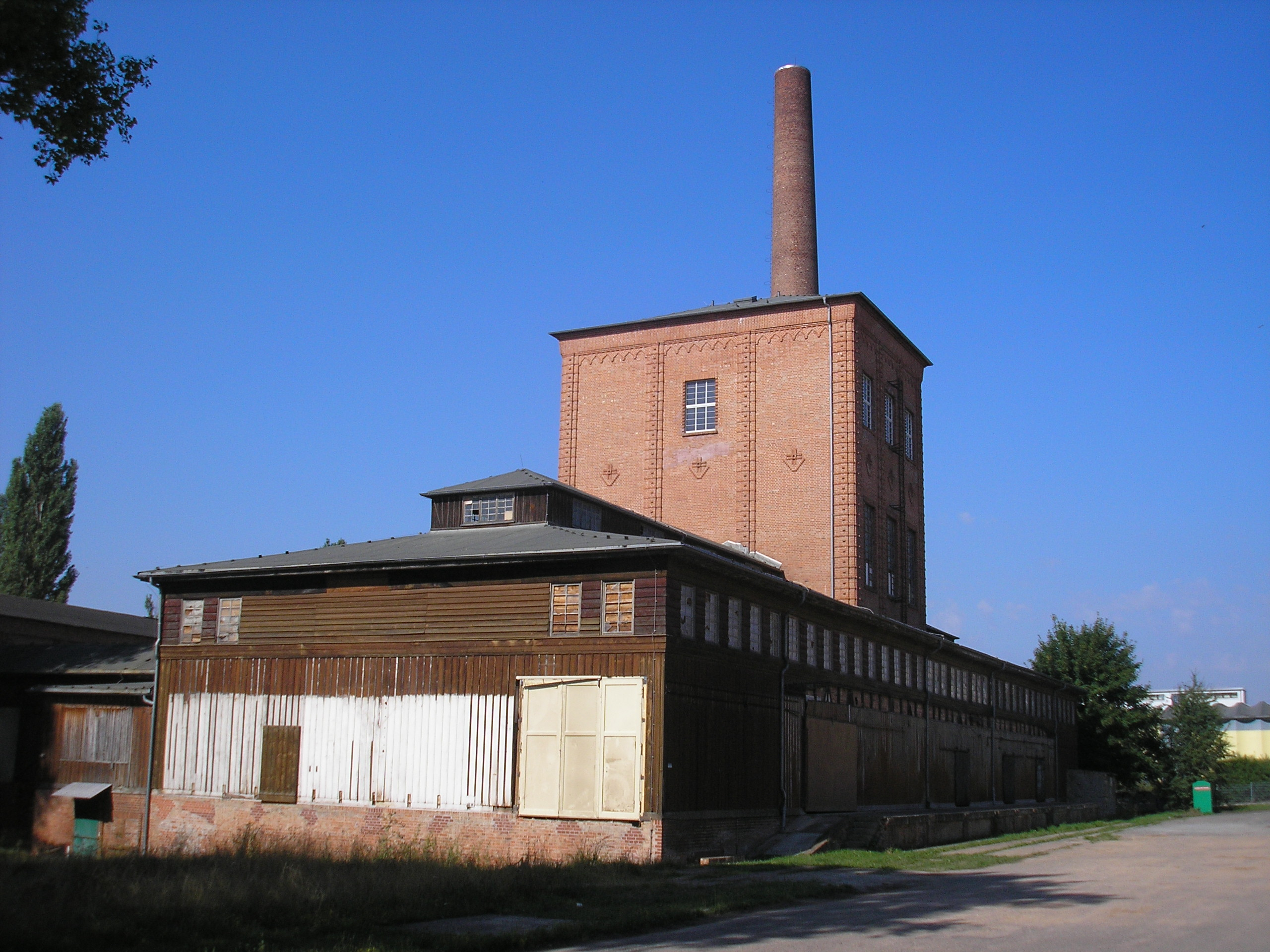
Former saline works

=== Historical Population ===
From 1960 as of 31 December

- 1612: 242 households
- 1831: 2640
- 1890: 4790
- 1933: 5889
- 1939: 6366
- 1960: 7296
- 1989: 7280
- 1994: 7064
- 1995: 7269
- 1996: 7157
- 1997: 7069
- 1998: 7067
- 2000: 6848
- 2001: 6732
- 2002: 6580
- 2003: 6424
- 2004: 6344
- 2005: 6201
- 2006: 6165
- 2007: 5970
- 2008: 5867
- 2009: 5824
- 2010: 5715
- 2011: 5742
- 2012: 5707
- 2013: 5658
- 2014: 5553
- 2015: 5590
- 2016: 5530

Data since 1994: Thüringian State Statistical Office

== Climate ==
Atern has a cool steppe climate (Köppen: BSk; Trewartha: BSbk), bordering on an oceanic one (Köppen: Cfb; Trewartha: Dobk), which is unique for Germany. The annual precipitation is 481.6 mm (18.96 in), and the precipitation in summer is more than twice that in winter.

The Artern weather station has recorded the following extreme values:

- Its highest temperature was 38.9 °C (102.0 °F) on 4 July 2015.
- Its lowest temperature was −23.6 °C (−10.5 °F) on 14 January 1987 and 24 February 1986.
- Its greatest annual precipitation was 665.7 mm (26.21 in) in 2007.
- Its least annual precipitation was 272.6 mm (10.73 in) in 2018.
- The longest annual sunshine was 2,033.6 hours in 2003.
- The shortest annual sunshine was 1,194.1 hours in 1977.

Climate data for Artern (1991–2020 normals, extremes 1954–present)
Month	Jan	Feb	Mar	Apr	May	Jun	Jul	Aug	Sep	Oct	Nov	Dec	Year
Record high °C (°F)	15.3 (59.5)	18.4 (65.1)	24.8 (76.6)	31.0 (87.8)	32.4 (90.3)	37.2 (99.0)	38.9 (102.0)	37.9 (100.2)	33.3 (91.9)	27.3 (81.1)	21.8 (71.2)	17.1 (62.8)	38.9 (102.0)
Mean maximum °C (°F)	11.0 (51.8)	13.1 (55.6)	18.4 (65.1)	23.6 (74.5)	27.8 (82.0)	31.3 (88.3)	33.1 (91.6)	33.2 (91.8)	27.5 (81.5)	21.9 (71.4)	15.5 (59.9)	11.7 (53.1)	35.0 (95.0)
Mean daily maximum °C (°F)	3.4 (38.1)	5.0 (41.0)	9.5 (49.1)	15.1 (59.2)	19.2 (66.6)	22.6 (72.7)	25.1 (77.2)	25.0 (77.0)	20.1 (68.2)	14.1 (57.4)	7.8 (46.0)	4.2 (39.6)	14.2 (57.6)
Daily mean °C (°F)	0.9 (33.6)	1.7 (35.1)	5.0 (41.0)	9.6 (49.3)	13.6 (56.5)	16.9 (62.4)	19.1 (66.4)	18.9 (66.0)	14.6 (58.3)	9.7 (49.5)	5.0 (41.0)	1.9 (35.4)	9.7 (49.5)
Mean daily minimum °C (°F)	−1.7 (28.9)	−1.5 (29.3)	1.0 (33.8)	4.2 (39.6)	8.0 (46.4)	11.4 (52.5)	13.5 (56.3)	13.3 (55.9)	9.7 (49.5)	5.8 (42.4)	2.2 (36.0)	−0.6 (30.9)	5.4 (41.7)
Mean minimum °C (°F)	−11.3 (11.7)	−9.8 (14.4)	−5.0 (23.0)	−2.1 (28.2)	1.9 (35.4)	6.3 (43.3)	8.8 (47.8)	7.9 (46.2)	4.0 (39.2)	−1.3 (29.7)	−4.4 (24.1)	−8.8 (16.2)	−13.4 (7.9)
Record low °C (°F)	−23.6 (−10.5)	−23.6 (−10.5)	−19.1 (−2.4)	−7.2 (19.0)	−2.6 (27.3)	1.2 (34.2)	4.3 (39.7)	4.2 (39.6)	0.0 (32.0)	−7.2 (19.0)	−17.3 (0.9)	−24.2 (−11.6)	−23.6 (−10.5)
Average precipitation mm (inches)	27.6 (1.09)	22.4 (0.88)	32.8 (1.29)	31.4 (1.24)	59.2 (2.33)	46.3 (1.82)	67.5 (2.66)	49.2 (1.94)	44.9 (1.77)	33.3 (1.31)	36.3 (1.43)	33.8 (1.33)	481.6 (18.96)
Average extreme snow depth cm (inches)	6.3 (2.5)	5.3 (2.1)	3.2 (1.3)	0.2 (0.1)	0 (0)	0 (0)	0 (0)	0 (0)	0 (0)	trace	1.7 (0.7)	5.1 (2.0)	10.6 (4.2)
Average precipitation days (≥ 0.1 mm)	15.6	13.2	14.4	11.4	12.8	12.7	13.8	12.5	11.7	14.1	14.9	16.2	162.9
Average snowy days (≥ 1.0 cm)	8.2	7.3	2.6	0.1	0	0	0	0	0	0	1.4	5.4	28.6
Average relative humidity (%)	85.0	81.3	76.1	69.1	70.8	70.6	68.4	68.0	75.0	82.6	87.2	86.8	76.7
Mean monthly sunshine hours	54.6	76.8	124.6	184.4	220.3	221.2	222.6	210.0	155.8	103.9	51.5	43.5	1,669.5
Source 1: NOAA
Source 2: Deutscher Wetterdienst / SKlima.de

== Twin towns ==
The town has three sister cities:

- Einbeck in Niedersachsen (since 2 July 1990)
- Topoľčany in Slovakia (since 1982, renewed on 2 October 1992)
- Mazingarbe in France (since 11 May 1996)

== Notable residents ==
- John Christopher Kunze (1744-1807), Pietist and evangelical missionary
- Richard Ungewitter (1869-1959), former organizer of the nudist movement
- Johanna Schaller, later Johanna Klier (born 1952), former East German hurdler and Olympic gold medallist
