= Dorothea of Mansfeld =

Peerage person ID=6575

Countess Dorothea of Mansfeld (1493–8 June 1578) was a German noblewoman and healer. She was well known around Germany for her medical recipes, mentorship, and generosity towards people of all social classes.

== Early life and family ==
Dorothea of Mansfeld was a noblewoman, and one of the most famous female healers in Germany. She was born around 1493 and died in 1578. She was one of twelve children born to Count Philip of Solms-Lich and Adriana of Hanau Munzenberg. Dorothea's passion for medicine was influenced by her elder brother, Count Reinhard I of Solms-Lich, who was educated in medicine. Many of her family members were medical healers. This included her daughter (Dorothea of Schönberg), her niece (Anna of Hohenlohe), her daughter-in-law (Agnes of Solms), and her niece by marriage (Agnes of Solms). Dorothea married in 1512 to Count Ernst II of Mansfeld-Vorderort and had thirteen children. She became a widow at the age of 38 in 1531. Dorothea lived in the Mansfeld Castle with most of her family and children. While there, she possessed a well-stocked apothecary, a distilling house, and full garden of herbs and plants for her various recipes. The Mansfeld castle is located in Saxony-Anhalt, Germany. Before her move to Saxony, her location, much like information on her early life, is unknown. Most documentation on the Mansfeld region before the 19th century has been lost.

== Medical practice ==
Dorothea was commonly known for her selfless service to people of all social classes. The most important aspect of her medical care was her altruistic acts of kindness towards the poor. She was a very charitable healer and her medical recipes were known to heal thousands of people from near and far. Despite being a widow, and therefore economically unstable, she used her healing abilities to heal both rich and poor people. She gave many gifts, and would often perform medical healing as an act of charity. With a humanist upbringing by her father, she learned to create relationships with noble people of both Catholic and Protestant background, she was also supportive to the Jewish community that tried to make a home in the Mansfeld area.

It was expected for noblewomen to have basic medical knowledge in order to provide assistance to anyone living on their estates. However, Dorothea extensively researched medical practices, and developed a knowledge that surpassed these narrow expectations. Her work gained fame when she was almost 80 years old. Many of Dorothea's recipes were referenced in medical recipe books, and her medical advice was sought out by many German princes and noblemen. Her most prized recipes were for two types of aqua vitae a white and a yellow version. Both were strong alcoholic beverages, the yellow slightly sweeter. These drinks were very popular because they could be used to treat multiple ailments. These recipes made use of distilled water, which was a popular medical treatment for the elite. The distillation process for any medicine took long periods of time from months to years. Dorothea was one of the earliest to create a distilling house on her property, and after her example many noblewomen followed. These distilleries were not only present on private properties but also at churches, monasteries, and other public locations. The garden at the Mansfeld castle grew many of the common ingredients that Dorothea used for her recipes such as herbs, flowers, fruits, and other plants.

== Sample recipe ==
Dorothea's recipe books and other copied works were well-regarded due to both her medical knowledge and appealing penmanship. Her penmanship was considered to have exceptional form; making books during this time period was a long process, requiring patience, money, and practice.

Example recipe: Plague treatment recipes [Summer 1572]

- 2 handfuls chopped licorice
- 2 handfuls senna leaves
- 1 handful hart's tongue
- 1 handful spike lavender
- 2 good handfuls bog bean flowers, very good for this illness
- 2 handfuls pulverized juniper berries
- 1 handful scurvy weed
- 1 handful yellow lily root, chopped finely
- 1 handful gray cress
- 1 handful mint
- 1 handful sage leaves and one-half mab honey
- 1 handful hyssop

== Relationships ==
Dorothea's relationship with Anne of Denmark, Electress of Saxony was a noteworthy partnership. The two elite women are commonly known for their extensive experimentation with medical remedies Letters reveal this close relationship, and highlight that the two women in addition to creating medical recipes together, practiced other skills and visited often Anna of Saxony was the wife of a politician, and this relationship helped Dorothea financial situation immensely. Dorothea acted as a mentor and assistant to Anna, in turn Anna helped Dorothea's recipes live on by passing them on to her children and sharing them long after Dorothea's death. Both noblewomen possessed their own personal distillation houses and gardens in which they grew the necessary herbs to create their medical remedies.

Dorothea's medical facility was very impressive at the time, and deserving of a detailed description in a book by Cyriacus Spangenber Spangenber talked highly of Dorothea's garden, library, and heavily stocked apothecary. Many of Dorothea's recipes were referenced in medical recipe books and she extended her medical expertise to German princes and other male medical professionals. Additionally, Anna of Saxony notes that Dorothea passed her medical knowledge on to a small group of female medical healers that included Dorothea of Schönberg, Anna of Hohenlohe, Agnes of Solms, and Magdlena of Mansfeld This group of women commonly visited Mansfeld Castle and referred to Dorothea as the "mother of Mansfeld" Medicine was often viewed as a feminine practice, therefore creating medical recipes was an acceptable activity for these noblewomen.

Another noteworthy relationship Dorothea had was with Martin Luther. Martin Luther had the best care available to him, yet he sought out the medical advice of Dorothea. By the time of her death, her medical practices were widely known throughout Germany.
