= List of World Heritage Sites in Western Europe =

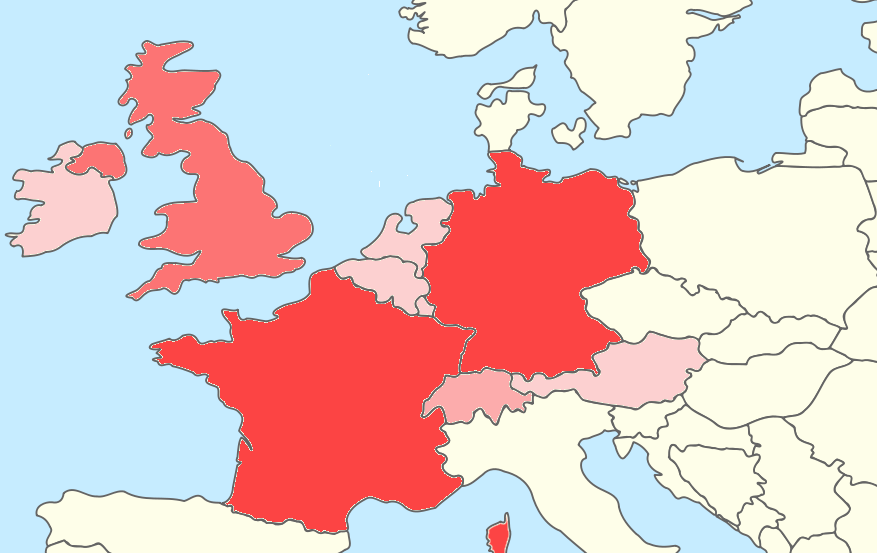
Location of World Heritage Sites within Western Europe. Some trans-national sites are partly in non-Western European countries. For trans-national sites the UNESCO latitude and longitude may not be in Western Europe.
No sites or not in Western Europe
- 1-10 sites
- 11-20 sites
- 21-30 sites
- 31+ sites
- trans-national sites
- national sites

The United Nations Educational, Scientific and Cultural Organization (UNESCO) has designated 171 World Heritage Sites in Western Europe (including international dependencies). These sites are located in 9 countries (also called "state parties"); Germany and France are home to the most with 46 and 45, while Liechtenstein, Monaco and the British Crown Dependencies of the Isle of Man, Guernsey and Jersey have no sites. There are twelve sites which are shared between state parties both in and out of Western Europe. The first site from the region to be included on the list was the Aachen Cathedral in Germany in 1978, the year of the list's conception.

Each year, UNESCO's World Heritage Committee may inscribe new sites on the list, or delist sites that no longer meet the criteria. Selection is based on ten criteria: six for cultural heritage (i–vi) and four for natural heritage (vii–x). Some sites, designated "mixed sites," represent both cultural and natural heritage. In Western Europe, there are 151 cultural, 18 natural, and 2 mixed sites.

The World Heritage Committee may also specify that a site is endangered, citing "conditions which threaten the very characteristics for which a property was inscribed on the World Heritage List." Presently, none of the sites in Western Europe are currently listed as endangered, though two German sites and an English site were previously listed: the Cologne Cathedral was marked as endangered in 2004 due to the construction of several high-rise buildings around it, but it was removed from the list in 2006. The Dresden Elbe Valley site was listed in 2006 in hopes of halting the construction of the four lane Waldschlösschen Bridge through the valley. When construction continued as planned, it became the second site to be delisted as a World Heritage in 2009, the first being Oman's Arabian Oryx Sanctuary two years earlier. Liverpool Maritime Mercantile City was listed in 2004, marked as endangered in 2012 due to planned developments in the protected area, and removed from the list in 2021 when development plans went ahead.

== List ==
=== Legend ===
The list below uses a cultural definition of Western Europe (which includes Ireland and the United Kingdom, contrary to the United Nations Statistics Division's definition). It also omits eight sites outside of Europe belonging to European state parties: Curaçao (Netherlands), French Austral Lands and Seas (France), French Polynesia (France), New Caledonia (France), Reunion Island (France), Gough Island (United Kingdom), Henderson Island (United Kingdom), and Bermuda (United Kingdom). These sites are included in the African, American, and Oceania lists.

Site – named after the World Heritage Committee's official designation
Location – sorted by country, followed by the region at the regional or provincial level and geocoordinates. In the case of multinational or multi-regional sites, the names are sorted alphabetically.
Criteria – as defined by the World Heritage Committee
Area – in hectares and acres, followed by buffer zones if applicable. A value of zero implies that no data has been published by UNESCO
Year – during which the site was inscribed to the World Heritage List
Description – brief information about the site, including reasons for qualifying as an endangered site, if applicable

* Trans-border site

=== World Heritage Sites ===
Site	Image	Location	Criteria	Area ha (acre)	Year	Description
Aachen Cathedral	A Gothic, castle-like building, located in a rural area and surrounded by several trees.	Aachen, Germany; 50°46′28″N 6°5′4″E	Cultural: (i), (ii), (iv), (vi)	0.2 (0.49)	1978	An iconic feat of architecture that sparked copies around Germany for centuries to come, Aachen's cathedral became the first-built vaulted structure since antiquity. The town itself was closely tied to Charlemagne during the cathedral's inception, which explains why it became his burial place when he died in 814.
Abbey and Altenmünster of Lorsch	A stand-alone gatehouse surrounded by many trees.	Lorsch, Germany; 49°39′13″N 8°34′7″E	Cultural: (iii), (iv)	3.34 (8.3)	1991	The abbey and gate or 'Torhall', are from the Carolingian era. The notable Carolingian sculptures and paintings are still in good condition.
Abbey Church of Saint-Savin sur Gartempe	A large chapel, taken from a bridge seen in the foreground.	Vienne, France; 46°33′53″N 0°51′58″E	Cultural: (i), (iii)	1.61 (4.0)	1983	Often referred to as the "Romanesque Sistine Chapel", the church features well-preserved murals from the 11th and 12th centuries.
Amiens Cathedral	A very tall cathedral with three large entrances.	Amiens, France; 49°53′42″N 2°18′6″E	Cultural: (i), (ii)	1.54 (3.8)	1981	Amiens Cathedral is known as one of the classic Gothic churches of the 13th century. Following a devastating fire in 1218, it spent almost an entire 200 years under construction before taking on its current form in 1401, after which it has remained in great shape.
Ancient and Primeval Beech Forests of the Carpathians and Other Regions of Europe		Albania*; Austria*; Belgium*; Bulgaria*; Croatia*; Germany*; Italy*; Romania*; Slovakia*; Slovenia*; Spain*; Ukraine*; 49°5′10″N 22°32′10″E	Natural: (ix)	92,023 (227,390); buffer zone 253,815 (627,190)	2007 (Note: Extended in 2011 to include the Ancient Beech Forests of Germany and name change from Primeval Beech Forests of the Carpathians. Extended again in 2017 to include additional sites in other countries and changed named again to present name.)	Primeval Beech Forests of the Carpathians are used to study the spread of the beech tree (Fagus sylvatica) in the Northern Hemisphere across a variety of environments and the environment in the forest. The addition of the Ancient Beech Forests of Germany in 2011 included five forests totaling 4,391 hectares (10,850 acres) that are added to the 29,278 hectares (72,350 acres) of Slovak and Ukrainian beech forests inscribed on the World Heritage List in 2007. The site was further expanded in 2017 to include forests in 9 additional European countries.
Archaeological Border complex of Hedeby and the Danevirke	Reconstructed houses in the area of the old settlement	Schleswig, Schleswig-Holstein, Germany; 54°29′28″N 9°33′55″E	Cultural: (iii), (iv)	227.55 (562.3)	2018	Hedeby was an important settlement of Danish Vikings and Swedish Varangians. It is considered an early medieval city in northern Europe and was an important trading place and main hub for long-distance trade between Scandinavia, western Europe, the North Sea region and the Baltic States. The Danevirke is a fortification of the early and high Middle Ages in northern Schleswig-Holstein, Germany. It consists of earth walls with moats, a brick wall, two medieval wall castles and a sea barrier.
Brú na Bóinne - Archaeological Ensemble of the Bend of the Boyne	A large, circular stone tomb with a top covered with a thin grass.	County Meath, Ireland; 53°41′30.012″N 6°27′0″W	Cultural: (i), (iii), (iv)	770 (1,900)	1993	The site is a unique testament to the longevity of several prehistoric and medieval settlements, featuring various cultural, artistic and scientific advancements that span four millennia.
The Architectural Work of Le Corbusier, an Outstanding Contribution to the Modern Movement		Argentina*; Belgium*; France*; Germany*; India*; Japan*; Switzerland*; 46°28′06″N 6°49′46″E	Cultural: (i), (ii), (vi)	98 (240)	2016	Seventeen examples in seven countries of the work of modern architecture pioneer Le Corbusier. These buildings span about half a century of work and illustrate the solutions that modern architects found to meet the needs of society as well as the international reach of modern architecture.
Arles, Roman and Romanesque Monuments	A large stone amphitheatre which is surrounded by many buildings.	Bouches-du-Rhône, France; 43°40′40″N 4°37′51″E	Cultural: (ii), (iv)	65 (160)	1981	The city, originally built in the 6th century BCE by Phocaean settlers from Greece, was remodelled by the Romans and slowly grew into an important metropolis, both politically and religiously. By 480, however, Arles was conquered by Barbarians and suffered a decline in its status until the 9th century, when Boso founded what would later become the Kingdom of Burgundy-Arles, where it regained its importance.
Bauhaus and its Sites in Weimar, Dessau and Bernau	Bauhaus Dessau building	Weimar, Dessau and Bernau; Germany; 50°58′29″N 11°19′46″E	Cultural: (ii), (iv), (vi)	8.16 (20.2); buffer zone 59 (150)	1996 (Note: Extended in 2017 to include new sites in Dessau and Bernau and name changed from Bauhaus and its sites in Weimar and Dessau to the present name.)	Founded in 1919 in Weimar, the Bauhaus was the most influential art school of the 20th century. The buildings designed by the masters of the Bauhaus are fundamental representatives of Classical Modernism. The joint heritage site includes the Bauhaus school buildings in Weimar and the Haus am Horn, Weimar; the Bauhaus Dessau building, the Meisterhäuser (where senior staff lived) and the Laubenganghäuser ('Houses with Balcony Access'); and the ADGB Trade Union School in Bernau bei Berlin.
Belfries of Belgium and France	A large tower with a clock near its top.	Belgium*; France*; 50°10′28″N 3°13′53″E	Cultural: (ii), (iv)	—	1999	The UNESCO entry covers 56 culturally significant belfries across France and Belgium, built over a period of several centuries.
Benedictine Convent of St John at Müstair	A clock tower standing beside two small houses and a museum.	Müstair, Switzerland; 46°37′46″N 10°26′52″E	Cultural: (iii)	2,036 (5,030)	1983	The Convent of Müstair is a Christian monastery from the Carolingian period. It has Switzerland's greatest series of figurative murals, painted c. 800 AD, along with other Romanesque art and designs.
Bergpark Wilhelmshöhe	Hercules Monument and the giant cascades.	Kassel, Germany; 51°18′57″N 9°23′35″E	Cultural: (iii), (iv)	559 (1,380)	2013	Bergpark Wilhelmshöhe is the largest European hillside park, and second largest park on a mountain slope in the world. Its waterworks along with the towering Hercules statue constitute an expression of the ideals of absolutist Monarchy while the ensemble is a remarkable testimony to the aesthetics of the Baroque and Romantic periods.
Berlin Modernism Housing Estates	Panzerkreuzer apartment building, a white four storey apartment complex	Berlin, Germany; 52°26′54″N 13°27′0″E	Cultural: (ii), (iv)	88 (220)	2008	The property consists of six housing estates from 1910 to 1933. It is an example of the building reform movement that contributed to improved housing and living conditions for people with low incomes. The estates also showcase a number of new designs, decoration and layouts. The lessons learned here were applied on other projects around the world. Some of the notable architects on these house were; Bruno Taut, Martin Wagner and Walter Gropius.
Blaenavon Industrial Landscape	A small mining site overlooking a small city and large fields.	Torfaen, Wales, United Kingdom; 51°46′35″N 3°5′17″W	Cultural: (iii), (iv)	3,290 (8,100)	2000	In the 19th century, Wales was the world's foremost producer of iron and coal. Blaenavon is an example of the landscape created by the industrial processes associated with the production of these materials. The site includes quarries, public buildings, workers' housing, and a railway.
Blenheim Palace	A large brick building with a freshly mowed lawn in front.	Woodstock, England, United Kingdom; 51°50′31″N 1°21′41″W	Cultural: (ii), (iv)	—	1987	Blenheim Palace, the residence of John Churchill, 1st Duke of Marlborough, was designed by architects John Vanbrugh and Nicholas Hawksmoor. The associated park was landscaped by Capability Brown. The palace celebrated victory over the French and is significant for establishing English Romantic Architecture as a separate entity from French Classical Architecture.
Bordeaux, Port of the Moon	A short tower stands beside two long peripheral buildings of a similar style.	Gironde, France; 44°50′20″N 0°34′20″E	Cultural: (ii), (iv)	1,731 (4,280)	2007	A port city world-renowned for its wine industry, Bordeaux is also a coherent blend of classical and neo-classical architectural trends that symbolise the urban transformation from the 18th century onwards.
Bourges Cathedral	A moderately lit T-shaped cathedral shines at dusk.	Bourges, France; 47°4′56″N 2°23′54″E	Cultural: (i), (iv)	0.85 (2.1)	1992	Originally built to confirm the ruling of the archdiocese and rebuilt due to fire, the cathedral is simplistic in its design, yet considered be a unique landmark of the city. Some of the medieval-era houses still surround the church.
Canal du Midi	A speedboat sails along a narrow river surrounded by a trail and trees on both of its sides.	Southern France, France; 43°36′41″N 1°24′59″E	Cultural: (i), (ii), (iv), (vi)	1,172 (2,900)	1996	Called "one of the greatest engineering achievements of the modern age", the 360 km (220 mi) Canal du Midi is the result of 17th-century projects that linked the Mediterranean Sea with the Atlantic Ocean, essentially setting the stage for the Industrial Revolution. Creator Pierre-Paul Riquet also placed heavy emphasis on the aesthetics of the waterway so that it would blend with its surroundings.
Canterbury Cathedral, St Augustine's Abbey, and St Martin's Church	A beige-colored cathedral with various entrances.	Canterbury, England, United Kingdom; 51°16′48″N 1°4′59″E	Cultural: (i), (ii), (vi)	18 (44)	1988	St Martin's Church is the oldest church in England. The church and St Augustine's Abbey were founded during the early stages of the introduction of Christianity to the Anglo-Saxons. The cathedral exhibits Romanesque and Gothic architecture, and is the seat of the Church of England.
Carolingian Westwork and Civitas Corvey	A grey stone cathedral with two towers topped with pyramidal spires.	Höxter, Germany, Germany; 51°46′42″N 9°24′37″E	Cultural: (ii), (iii), (iv)	12 (30)	2014	The abbey church was built between AD 822 and 885. Today the westwork is the only standing structure that dates back to the Carolingian era, while the ruins of the abbey are only partly excavated. It was an important center of early Frankish imperial administration and in the spread of Christianity in Germany.
Castles and Town Walls of King Edward in Gwynedd	A medieval-style castle with a parking lot in the foreground.	Gwynedd, Wales, United Kingdom; 53°8′23″N 4°16′37″W	Cultural: (i), (iii), (iv)	6 (15)	1986	During the reign of Edward I of England (1272–1307), a series of castles were constructed in Wales with the purpose of subduing the population and establishing English colonies in Wales. The World Heritage Site covers many castles including Beaumaris, Caernarfon, Conwy, and Harlech. The castles of Edward I are considered the pinnacle of military architecture by military historians.
Castles of Augustusburg and Falkenlust at Brühl	A giant stretch of road leads to an open gate enclosing a large palace.	Brühl, North Rhine-Westphalia, Germany; 50°49′30″N 6°54′35″E	Cultural: (ii), (iv)	89 (220)	1984	Augustusburg Castle, the residence of the prince-archbishops of Cologne, and the Falkenlust hunting lodge are both examples of early German Rococo architecture.
Cathedral of Notre-Dame, Former Abbey of Saint-Rémi and Palace of Tau, Reims	A large building with two distinct summits and two large entrances side-to-side.	Reims, France; 49°15′12″N 4°1′58″E	Cultural: (i), (ii), (vi)	4.16 (10.3)	1991	Notre-Dame in Reims is one of the masterpieces of Gothic art. The former abbey still has its beautiful 9th-century nave, in which lie the remains of Archbishop St Rémi (440–533), who instituted the Holy Anointing of the kings of France. The former archiepiscopal palace known as the Tau Palace, which played an important role in religious ceremonies, was almost entirely rebuilt in the 17th century.
The Causses and the Cévennes	A small village lies almost hidden by trees in a narrow valley between steep sided mountains.	Southern France, France; 44°13′13″N 3°28′23″E	Cultural: (iii), (v)	302,319 (747,050)	2011	This site, in the southern part of central France, displays the relationship between local farming and the environment. The region is mountainous with numerous narrow valleys. The local farmers had to adapt to raise food in this difficult landscape. The valleys of the Causses were developed and controlled by large abbeys, starting in the 11th century. Mont Lozère is one of the last places where summer transhumance is still practiced in the traditional way.
Caves and Ice Age Art in the Swabian Jura	Interior of a cave with several dark pools on the rough floor	Ach and Lone Valleys, Germany; 48°23′16″N 9°45′56″E; 48°32′56″N 10°10′32″E	Cultural: (iii)	462.1 (1,142)	2017	Excavated from the 1860s, six caves have revealed items dating from 43,000 to 33,000 years ago, including one statuette of a female form, carved figurines of animals, musical instruments and items of personal adornment. These archaeological sites feature some of the oldest figurative art worldwide and help shed light on the origins of human artistic development.
Champagne hillsides, houses and cellars		Marne, France; 49°04′39″N 3°56′46″E	Cultural: (iii), (iv), (vi)	1,101 (2,720)	2015	This site includes historic vineyards of Hautvillers, Aÿ and Mareuil-sur-Aÿ, Saint-Nicaise Hill in Reims and Avenue de Champagne and Fort Chabrol in Épernay.
Chartres Cathedral	A large cathedral with two distinct summits.	Chartres, France; 48°26′51″N 1°29′14″E	Cultural: (i), (ii), (iv)	1.06 (2.6)	1979	The cathedral was started in 1145 and rebuilt after a fire in 1194. It is a masterpiece of French Gothic art. The sculptures are from the 12th century and the stained-glass windows are from the 12th and 13th centuries.
Chaîne des Puys - Limagne fault tectonic arena	View of the Chaîne des Puys from Puy de Dôme.	Auvergne-Rhône-Alpes, France; 45.5°N 2.8°E	Natural: (viii)	24,223 (59,860)	2018	
La Chaux-de-Fonds / Le Locle, Watchmaking Town Planning	A fairly large city with buildings of diverse sizes.	Canton of Neuchâtel, Switzerland; 47°6′14″N 6°49′58″E	Cultural: (iv)	284 (700)	2009	The site consists of two towns situated close to one another in a remote environment in the Swiss Jura mountains. Due to poor agricultural land, the watchmaking industry developed in the towns in the 19th century. After several devastating fires the towns were rebuilt to support this single industry. The town of La Chaux-de-Fonds was described by Karl Marx as a "huge factory-town" in Das Kapital where he analyzed the division of labour in the watchmaking industry of the Jura.
Cistercian Abbey of Fontenay	A corridor enclosed by large pillars, which ends with a small doorway.	Marmagne, Côte-d'Or, France; 47°38′22″N 4°23′21″E	Cultural: (iv)	5.77 (14.3)	1981	The monastery was founded by St Bernard in 1119. The abbey was built to be self-sufficient and to isolate the residents from the outside world. In addition to the church and monks' quarters, it had a bakery and ironworks to help make it independent.
City of Bath	An aerial view of a semicircular terrace of houses.	Somerset, England, United Kingdom; 51°22′53″N 2°21′31″W	Cultural: (i), (ii), (iv)	2,900 (7,200)	1987	Founded by the Romans as a spa, an important centre of the wool industry in the medieval period, and a spa town in the 18th century, Bath has a varied history. The city is preserved for its Roman remains and Palladian architecture.
City of Graz – Historic Centre and Schloss Eggenberg	A short but large clock tower shines at dawn.	Styria, Austria; 47°4′27″N 15°23′30″E	Cultural: (ii), (iv)	—	1999	A branch of the Habsburg family lived in Graz for centuries. The Habsburgs and other local nobles beautified and expanded Graz over centuries, leading to a city with grand buildings in a number of styles.
City of Luxembourg: its Old Quarters and Fortifications	A panoramic view of a city. A small church is at the left, while a stony cliff flanks a small road leading to various buildings to the right.	Luxembourg; 49°36′36″N 6°7′59.988″E	Cultural: (iv)	30 (74)	1994	Luxembourg occupies a strategically important location in the region. Over the centuries it was traded back and forth by the great powers in Europe, each of which fortified and expanded the city. Though many of the walls were dismantled in 1867, portions still remain.
Classical Weimar	A grayscale image of a small museum with a statue of two men in front.	Thuringia, Germany; 50°58′39″N 11°19′43″E	Cultural: (iii), (vi)	—	1998	Weimar became a cultural center in the late 18th and early 19th centuries. Among the many artists and writers, the city was home to Goethe and Schiller. During this same period elegant buildings and parks were built in Weimar.
The Climats, terroirs of Burgundy		Côte-d'Or, France; 47°03′29″N 4°51′52″E	Cultural: (iii), (v)	13,219 (32,660)	2015	
Collegiate Church, Castle, and Old Town of Quedlinburg	A town square with four visible buildings and a few tourists.	Harz, Germany; 51°47′0″N 11°9′0″E	Cultural: (iv)	90 (220)	1994	The preservation of old Quedlinberg allows tourists to see 16th- and 17th-century timber-framed houses and walk down medieval-patterned streets, while the Romanesque castle and cathedral, housing the bodies of Henry I and his wife, tower over the town.
Cologne Cathedral	A large, brightly lit cathedral sits in the middle of a skyline at night.	Cologne, Germany; 50°56′28″N 6°57′26″E	Cultural: (i), (ii), (iv)	—	1996	While work on the Cologne Cathedral began in 1248, it remained incomplete until the Prussians picked up the task centuries later, finishing the job in 1880. It was heavily bombed in the Second World War, but restorations allowed it to become the most visited landmark in Germany, boasting 6.5 million visitors per year as of 2011.
Convent of St Gall	A large cathedral with two distinct summits.	St. Gallen, Switzerland; 47°25′24″N 9°22′40″E	Cultural: (ii), (iv)	—	1983	The Carolingian Convent of St Gall was one of the most important in Europe. It was in operation from the 8th century to its secularization in 1805. Its library is one of the richest and oldest in the world and contains a number of precious manuscripts such as the Plan of Saint Gall. Portions of the building were rebuilt in the Baroque style.
Cordouan Lighthouse		Gironde, France 45°35′11″N 1°10′24″W	Cultural: (i), (iv)	23,582 (58,270); buffer zone 139,615 (345,000)	2023	
Cornwall and West Devon Mining Landscape	A small stone building obstructs a view of waves crashing into rocks behind it.	South West England, United Kingdom; 50°8′10″N 5°23′1″W	Cultural: (ii), (iii), (iv)	19,719 (48,730)	2006	Tin and copper mining in Devon and Cornwall boomed in the 18th and 19th centuries, and at its peak the area produced two-thirds of the world's copper. The techniques and technology involved in deep mining developed in Devon and Cornwall were used around the world.
Decorated Cave of Pont d’Arc, known as Grotte Chauvet-Pont d’Arc, Ardèche	Prehistoric drawing showing the heads and fore quarters of four horses, drawn in black and ocher	Vallon-Pont-d'Arc, France; 44°23′20″N 4°24′59″E	Cultural: (i), (iii)	9 (22)	2014	The cave is home to over 1000 paintings and drawing from about 30,000 to 32,000 years before present as well as flora and fauna remains. It contains the earliest and best preserved examples of prehistoric cave art. The art is especially notable for its use of color, motion, anatomical precision and three-dimensionality.
Defence Line of Amsterdam	A small fortified building across a small footbridge.	Amsterdam, Netherlands; 52°22′28″N 4°53′35″E	Cultural:(ii), (iv), (v)	14,953 (36,950)	1996	Known in Dutch as the Stelling van Amsterdam, the 135-kilometre (84 mi) defence line surrounding the city was completed in 1920 to protect it from naval threats coming through the Markermeer. It was designed to temporarily flood the area comprising the line, enabling the 45 armed forts along it to effectively stage their countermeasures.
Derwent Valley Mills	A large building with many windows behind a blue fence.	Derbyshire, England, United Kingdom; 53°1′44″N 1°29′17″W	Cultural: (ii), (iv)	1,229 (3,040)	2001	The Derwent Valley Mills was the birthplace of the factory system; the innovations in the valley, including the development of workers' housing – such as at Cromford – and machines such as the water frame, were important in the Industrial Revolution. The Derwent Valley Mills influenced North America and Europe.
Dorset and East Devon Coast	A large, rocky cliff overlooking the sea to the right, crashing into the shore.	Dorset, England, United Kingdom; 50°42′20″N 2°59′23.6″W	Natural: (viii)	2,550 (6,300)	2001	The cliffs that make up the Dorset and Devon coast are an important site for fossils and provide a continuous record of life on land and in the sea in the area since 185 million years ago.
Droogmakerij de Beemster (Beemster Polder)	A row of small homes with varying architecture.	North Holland, Netherlands; 52°32′56″N 4°54′40″E	Cultural: (i), (ii), (iv)	—	1999	The early 17th-century Beemster Polder is a series of fields, roads, canals, dykes and settlements all built on land reclaimed from the sea.
Durham Castle and Cathedral	A courtyard in the foreground precedes a large medieval-style castle with a clock atop one of its peaks.	Durham, England, United Kingdom; 54°46′29″N 1°34′34″W	Cultural: (ii), (iv), (vi)	8.79 (21.7)	1986	Durham Cathedral is the "largest and finest" example of Norman architecture in England and vaulting of the cathedral was part of the advent of Gothic architecture. The cathedral houses relics of St Cuthbert and Bede. The Norman castle was the residence of the Durham prince-bishops.
Eisinga Planetarium in Franeker		Franeker, Friesland, Netherlands 53°11′14″N 5°32′38″E	Cultural:(iv)	0.009 (0.022); buffer zone 21.2 (52)	2023	
The English Lake District	A narrow green valley with a lake in the background.	North West England, United Kingdom; 54°28′36″N 3°4′57″W	Cultural: (ii), (v), (vi)	229,205.19 (566,378.4)	2017	The combined work of nature and human activity has produced a harmonious landscape in which the mountains are mirrored in the lakes. Grand houses, gardens and parks have been purposely created to enhance the beauty of this landscape. This landscape was greatly appreciated from the 18th century onwards by the Picturesque and later Romantic movements, which celebrated it in paintings, drawings and words. It also inspired an awareness of the importance of beautiful landscapes and triggered early efforts to preserve them.
Episcopal City of Albi	A distant view of a small city in the background and a narrow bridge hidden by a few trees along a river.	Tarn, France; 43°55′42″N 2°8′33″E	Cultural: (iv), (v)	19 (47)	2010	The once powerful Albi, founded as an agricultural town, gradually shifted its theme from fortifications to a much more classical Renaissance look that survives as a testament to the two eras in human history.
Erzgebirge/Krušnohoří Mining Region	Front and back of a silver coin.	Saxony, Germany* and Czech Republic*; 50°24′23″N 12°50′14″E	Cultural: (ii), (iii), (iv)	6,766.057 (16,719.29)	2019	The mountains in south-west Germany and north-west Czechia have been a source of metals including silver, tin and uranium beginning in the 12th century. The cultural landscape of the region was shaped by mining and smelting innovations.
Fagus Factory in Alfeld	A very long building with a semi-circular roof.	Alfeld, Germany; 51°59′1″N 9°48′40″E	Cultural: (ii), (iv)	1.88 (4.6)	2011	Built by Walter Gropius in 1910, the factory designed to manufacture shoe last was renowned for redefining decorative values of the time period, particularly in the wide use of glass to render the building much more homogeneous, which foreshadowed his later work with the Bauhaus.
Fertö / Neusiedlersee Cultural Landscape	A crow walks on a frozen lake near a narrow dock.	Burgenland and Győr-Moson-Sopron County, Austria*; Hungary*; 47°43′9.4″N 16°43′21.8″E	Cultural: (v)	52 (130)	2001	The Fertö/Neusiedler Lake area has been occupied by different peoples for eight millennia. A number of 18th- and 19th-century villages and castles were built on top of the ancient settlements and landscape.
Flemish Béguinages	A series of red houses with dark roofs are partially hidden behind a white, deteriorating wall.	Flanders, Belgium; 51°1′52″N 4°28′26″E	Cultural: (ii), (iii), (iv)	60 (150)	1998	The communities, called "béguinages", were built by the Béguines, religious women who "dedicated their lives to God without retiring from the world". Entire Flemish towns were created in the 13th century based on this principle of life.
Forth Bridge	A cantilever bridge crossing a wide river.	Scotland, United Kingdom; 56°0′3″N 3°23′23″W	Cultural: (i), (iv)	7.5 (19)	2015	The Forth Bridge is a cantilever railway bridge over the Firth of Forth, 9 miles (14 kilometres) west of Edinburgh City Centre. It is considered an iconic structure and a symbol of Scotland, and was designed by the English engineers Sir John Fowler and Sir Benjamin Baker.
Fortifications of Vauban	An aerial view of a large building and several other smaller buildings surrounded by a reinforced wall.	France; 50°16′57″N 2°45′32″E	Cultural: (i), (ii), (iv)	1,153 (2,850)	2008	The UNESCO entry covers 12 groups of fortified buildings in France engineered by Sébastien Le Prestre de Vauban, who worked under Louis XIV in the 17th century.
The Four Lifts on the Canal du Centre and their Environs, La Louvière and Le Roeulx	Two medium-sized boats float in front of a large iron structure.	La Louvière, Belgium; 50°28′52″N 4°8′14″E	Cultural: (iii), (iv)	67 (170)	1998	The hydraulic lifts along the Canal du Centre were made to overcome the 89.46-metre (293.5 ft) height difference between Mons and Charleroi. They are the last functioning lifts built at the turn of the 20th century.
Frontiers of the Roman Empire	A very long wall separating two large plains.	Central Lowlands, Northern England, and Southern Germany; Germany*; United Kingdom*; 54°59′33″N 2°36′4″W	Cultural: (ii), (iii), (iv)	527 (1,300)	1987	Hadrian's Wall was built in 122 AD and the Antonine Wall was constructed in 142 AD to defend the Roman Empire from "barbarians". The World Heritage Site was previously listed as Hadrian's Wall alone, but was later expanded to include all the frontiers of the Roman Empire at its zenith in the 2nd century, ranging from Antonine's Wall in the north to Trajan's Wall in eastern Europe.
Garden Kingdom of Dessau-Wörlitz	A small row boat navigates a wide river, while a forest stands in the background, hiding a large tower.	Saxony-Anhalt, Germany; 51°50′33″N 12°25′15″E	Cultural: (ii), (iv)	14,500 (36,000)	2000	"The Garden Kingdom of Dessau-Wörlitz is an outstanding example of the application of the philosophical principles of the Age of the Enlightenment to the design of a landscape that integrates art, education and economy in a harmonious whole."
Giant's Causeway and Causeway Coast	A small cove made up of tall and geometrically distinct rock formations, on which two couples are sitting.	County Antrim, Northern Ireland, United Kingdom; 55°15′0″N 6°29′7″W	Natural: (vii), (viii)	70 (170)	1986	The causeway is made up of 40,000 basalt columns projecting out of the sea. It was created by volcanic activity in the Tertiary period.
La Grand-Place, Brussels	A large city square with many large buildings around it.	Brussels, Belgium; 50°50′48.048″N 4°21′9″E	Cultural: (ii), (iv)	1.48 (3.7)	1998	Featuring Brussels' city hall, houses and other historic buildings, La Grand-Place is a well-preserved testament to the social and cultural life of the late 17th century.
Gulf of Porto: Calanche of Piana, Gulf of Girolata, Scandola Reserve	A large rock formation pierces through the ocean's surface.	Corsica, France; 42°19′31″N 8°37′43.8″E	Natural: (vii), (viii), (x)	11,800 (29,000)	1983	The Gulf of Porto is part of the Corsica Regional Park, hosting a variety of marine and avian life, as well as shrubland.
Hallstatt-Dachstein / Salzkammergut Cultural Landscape	A large lake surrounded by mountains lies in front of a small town in the corner of the frame.	Salzkammergut, Austria; 47°33′34″N 13°38′47″E	Cultural: (iii), (iv)	28,446 (70,290)	1997	The region built itself around salt mining, which began as early as 2,000 BCE and continued in the modern era. The region is also known for its mountain ranges and caves, the longest of the latter reaching a length of 81 km (50 mi).
Hanseatic City of Lübeck	A courtyard behind a large building with two cone-shaped summits holds flowers and trees on its sides.	Schleswig-Holstein, Germany; 53°52′0″N 10°41′30″E	Cultural: (iv)	81 (200)	1987	Lübeck was the trading capital of the influential Hanseatic League, which monopolised trade in much of Northern Europe. Although a fifth of the city was entirely destroyed in World War II, much of the original 12th-century architecture remains.
Heart of Neolithic Orkney	A small depression in the ground reveals a well-preserved excavation site with walls made of rock.	Mainland, Scotland, United Kingdom; 58°59′45.8″N 3°11′19″W	Cultural: (i), (ii), (iii), (iv)	15 (37)	1999	A collection of Neolithic sites with purposes ranging from occupation to ceremony. It includes the settlement of Skara Brae, the chambered tomb of Maes Howe and the stone circles of Stenness and Brodgar.
Historic Centre of Avignon: Papal Palace, Episcopal Ensemble and Avignon Bridge	A large castle-like building from the front.	Vaucluse, France; 43°57′10″N 4°48′22″E	Cultural: (i), (ii), (iv)	8.2 (20)	1995	
Historic Centre of Brugge	A small motorboat rides under a bridge over a canal, which runs between several buildings.	West Flanders, Belgium; 51°12′32.076″N 3°13′30.972″E	Cultural: (ii), (iv), (vi)	410 (1,000)	2000	One of the economic and commercial capitals of Europe in the late-Medieval period, Bruges boasts its intact Gothic and neo-Gothic architecture, which respectively documents its style from the Middle Ages to the Renaissance.
Historic Centre of Salzburg	A distant view of a city sitting atop a hill, overlooking a river at dawn.	Salzburg, Austria; 47°48′2″N 13°2′36″E	Cultural: (ii), (iv), (vi)	236 (580)	1996	Best associated with Austrian composer Wolfgang Amadeus Mozart, Salzburg is known for its ecclesiastic city-state qualities only second to Vatican City. It is also where German and Italian cultures intersected, which is reflected by its blend of Gothic- and Baroque-style buildings.
Historic Centre of Vienna	A large statue depicting a soldier riding a horse stands in the middle of a park.	Austria; 48°13′0″N 16°22′59″E	Cultural: (ii), (iv), (vi)	371 (920)	2001	"The historic centre of Vienna is rich in architectural ensembles, including Baroque castles and gardens, as well as the late-19th-century Ringstraße lined with grand buildings, monuments and parks."
Historic Centres of Stralsund and Wismar	A brick building with a roof tapering dramatically toward the top via large square windows.	Mecklenburg-Vorpommern, Germany; 54°18′9″N 13°5′7″E	Cultural: (ii), (iv)	168 (420)	2002	The two towns were major Hanseatic League trading centres in the 14th and 15th centuries. They then served as defensive and administrative centres for Sweden two hundred years later, notably during the Thirty Years' War. The architectural styles from both of these periods remain and are well-preserved.
Historic Fortified City of Carcassonne	A medieval castle-style wall sits on a heavy incline alongside flora.	Aude, France; 43°12′38″N 2°21′32″E	Cultural: (ii), (iv)	11 (27)	1997	
Historic Site of Lyon	A view of a courtyard, obstructed by a few trees, and a city in front of a large incline in the background.	Rhône, France; 45°46′2″N 4°50′0″E	Cultural: (ii), (iv)	427 (1,060)	1998	
Ir.D.F. Woudagemaal (D.F. Wouda Steam Pumping Station)	A large building stands behind a big pool of water, which enters the former through six gratings.	Lemmer, Netherlands; 52°50′45″N 5°40′44″E	Cultural: (i), (ii), (iv)	7.32 (18.1)	1998	
Ironbridge Gorge	A tall iron bridge stands above a small gorge.	Shropshire, England, United Kingdom; 52°37′35″N 2°28′22″W	Cultural: (i), (ii), (iv), (vi)	—	1986	Ironbridge Gorge contains mines, factories, workers' housing, and the transport infrastructure that was created in the gorge during the Industrial Revolution. The development of coke production in the area helped start the Industrial Revolution. The Iron Bridge was the world's first bridge built from iron and was architecturally and technologically influential.
Jewish-Medieval Heritage of Erfurt		Erfurt, Thuringia, Germany 50°58′43″N 11°01′45″E	Cultural: (iv)	—	2023	
Jodrell Bank Observatory	Jodrell Bank Experimental Station.	Cheshire, England, United Kingdom; 53°14.5′N 2°18.7′W	Cultural: (i), (ii), (iv), (vi)	17.38 (42.9)	2019	
Jurisdiction of Saint-Émilion	A view of a town with cramped houses and a church.	Gironde, France; 44°53′41″N 0°9′19″E	Cultural: (iii), (iv)	7,847 (19,390)	1999	The act of cultivating grapes was introduced to the region by the Romans around 27 BCE and became a large and enduring part of its economy over the course of the following millennia, despite wars and the changes of rule. Occupying 67.5% of the total commune, the vineyards accompany historic monuments and buildings in documenting a monocultural community's history.
Mill Network at Kinderdijk-Elshout	Five windmills along the left bank of a canal	Alblasserdam and Nieuw-Lekkerland, Netherlands; 51°52′57″N 4°38′58″E	Cultural: (i), (ii), (iv)	—	1997	The first canals and pumps to drain the land for farming were built here in the Middle Ages. They have continued to be used and expanded into the present day. The network includes a number of dykes, reservoirs, pumping stations, administrative buildings and a series of windmills.
Lavaux, Vineyard Terraces	Vineyard terraces rise above Lake Geneva	Vaud, Switzerland; 46°29′31″N 6°44′46″E	Cultural: (iii), (iv), (v)	1,408 (3,480)	2007	The Lavaux Vineyard Terraces stretch for about 30 km (19 mi) along the south-facing northern shores of Lake Geneva from Chillon Castle to the eastern outskirts of Lausanne in the Vaud region. The current terraces can be traced back to the 11th century, when Benedictine and Cistercian monasteries controlled the area.
Le Havre, the City Rebuilt by Auguste Perret	A distant view of a large city bordered by a beach.	Seine-Maritime, France; 49°29′34″N 0°6′27″E	Cultural: (ii), (iv)	133 (330)	2005	After their city was heavily bombed in World War II, Le Havre officials commissioned Auguste Perret to lead a reconstruction project. Perret's final product was a city blending its original layout and spirit with modern construction methods, urban planning and an innovative exploitation of concrete.
The Loire Valley between Sully-sur-Loire and Chalonnes	An ornate white castle in the middle of a pond or moat.	Loire Valley, France; 47°23′56″N 0°42′10″E	Cultural: (i), (ii), (iv)	85,394 (211,010)	2000	The Loire Valley contains historic towns and villages, castles and cultivated lands along the banks of the river Loire.
Luther Memorials in Eisleben and Wittenberg	A statue of a man holding a book stands in front of a white building.	Saxony-Anhalt, Germany; 51°51′53″N 12°39′10″E	Cultural: (iv), (vi)	—	1996	
The Maison Carrée of Nîmes		Nîmes, France 43°50′18″N 4°21′22″E	Cultural: (iv)	0.0474 (0.117); buffer zone 72.746 (179.76)	2023	
Major Mining Sites of Wallonia		Wallonia, Belgium; 50°26′7″N 3°50′18″E	Cultural: (ii), (iv)	118 (290)	2012	
Major Town Houses of the Architect Victor Horta (Brussels)	A medium-sized stairway that spirals as it climbs.	Brussels, Belgium; 50°49′41″N 4°21′44″E	Cultural: (i), (ii), (iv)	—	2000	
Margravial Opera House Bayreuth		Bayreuth, Bavaria; Germany; 49°56′40″N 11°34′43″E	Cultural: (i), (iv)	0.19 (0.47)	2012	
Maritime Greenwich	A view of a city coastline populated by white buildings with renaissance-era influences.	London, England, United Kingdom; 51°28′45″N 0°0′0″E	Cultural: (i), (ii), (iv), (vi)	110 (270)	1997	As well as the presence of the first example of Palladian architecture in England, and works by Christopher Wren and Inigo Jones, the area is significant for the Royal Observatory where the understanding of astronomy and navigation were developed.
Mathildenhöhe Darmstadt		Darmstadt, Hesse, Germany 49°52′32″N 8°39′59″E	Cultural: (ii), (iv)	5.37 (13.3); buffer zone 76.54 (189.1)	2021	
Maulbronn Monastery Complex	Monastery courtyard with the gothic church on the left and monastery buildings on the right	Maulbronn, Germany; 49°0′2.988″N 8°48′47.016″E	Cultural: (ii), (iv)	—	1993	The Cistercian Maulbronn Monastery is considered the most complete and best-preserved medieval monastic complex north of the Alps. The main buildings were constructed between the 12th and 16th centuries, along with the monastery walls. The monastery's church, mainly in Transitional Gothic style, helped spread the Gothic style across northern and central Europe. The monastery also had a large, elaborate water-management system.
Megaliths of Carnac and of the shores of Morbihan		Brittany, France 47°35′50″N 3°03′50″W	Cultural: (i), (iv)	19,598 (48,430); buffer zone 98,029 (242,230)	2025	
Messel Pit Fossil Site	An open quarry pit in the middle of rolling, shrub covered hills	Messel, Germany; 49°55′0″N 8°45′14″E	Natural: (viii)	42 (100)	1995	Messel Pit is the richest site in the world for understanding the environment of the Eocene, between 57 million and 36 million years ago. In particular, it shows the early stages of mammalian evolution and includes exceptionally well-preserved mammal fossils. Some of the most notable discoveries include fully articulated skeletons and the contents of the stomachs of animals.
Mines of Rammelsberg, Historic Town of Goslar and Upper Harz Water Management System	An aerial view showing several dammed lakes within a forested and urban landscape	Goslar, Upper Harz, Germany; 51°49′12″N 10°20′24″E	Cultural: (i), (ii), (iii), (iv)	1,010 (2,500)	1992	The Upper Harz water management system was developed over a period of some 800 years to assist in mining and extracting ore. The mines and their ponds began under the Cistercian monks in the Middle Ages. However, most of the works were built from the end of the 16th century until the 19th century. It is made up of an extremely complex system of artificial ponds, small channels, tunnels and underground drains. The mines were a major site for mining innovation in the western world.
Monastic Island of Reichenau	A grey and white stone church with two square towers, both capped with red, pyramidal roofs.	Baden-Württemberg, Germany; 47°41′55.4″N 9°3′40.7″E	Cultural: (iii), (iv), (vi)	—	2000	The site includes traces of the Benedictine monastery, founded in 724, which exercised remarkable spiritual, intellectual and artistic influence throughout the surrounding region. The churches of St Mary and Marcus, St Peter and St Paul, and St George, were mainly built between the 9th and 11th centuries. Their wall paintings and decorations show an impressive artistic activity.
Mont-Saint-Michel and its Bay	The buildings of Mont Saint Michel sit on a rocky island that rises above the surrounding fields and bay	Manche, France; 48°38′8″N 1°30′38″W	Cultural: (i), (iii), (vi)	6,558 (16,210)	1979	Perched on a rocky islet in the midst of vast sandbanks exposed to powerful tides between Normandy and Brittany stands a Gothic-style Benedictine abbey, and the village that grew up under its walls. Both the abbey and the village had to overcome a number of challenges due to the small, rocky island. Built between the 11th and 16th centuries, the abbey is an incredible technical and artistic project.
Monte San Giorgio	Monte San Giorgio, shown on the left in the background of Lake Lugano	Ticino, Italy*; Switzerland*; 45°53′20″N 8°54′50″E	Natural: (viii)	3,207 (7,920)	2010	The pyramid-shaped, wooded mountain of Monte San Giorgio beside Lake Lugano is regarded as the best fossil record of marine life from the Triassic Period (245–230 million years ago). The sequence records life in a tropical lagoon environment, sheltered and partially separated from the open sea by an offshore reef. Diverse marine life flourished within this lagoon, including reptiles, fish, bivalves, ammonites, echinoderms and crustaceans. Because the lagoon was near land, the remains also include land-based fossils of reptiles, insects and plants, resulting in an extremely rich source of fossils.
Museumsinsel (Museum Island), Berlin	An ornate grey stone building on the point of an urbanized island. The building is connected by two bridges to the neighboring banks	Berlin, Germany; 52°31′11″N 13°23′55″E	Cultural: (ii), (iv)	8.6 (21)	1999	The five museums on the Museumsinsel in Berlin, built between 1824 and 1930, are a unified but diverse collection of museum collections and buildings. Each museum was built to mesh with the collection and represents the aesthetic of the different times. The collections trace the development of civilizations throughout the ages.
Muskauer Park / Park Mużakowski	A red, ornate neo-gothic castle in a park-like location, the main tower of the castle is located to the left and topped with an ornate round dome and spire	Upper Lusatia, Germany*; Poland*; 51°34′46″N 14°43′35″E	Cultural: (i), (iv)	348 (860)	2004	A landscaped park astride the Neisse River and the border between Poland and Germany, it was created by Prince Hermann von Puckler-Muskau from 1815 to 1844. Designed as a 'painting with plants', it used local plants to enhance the existing landscape. The park spreads into the town of Muskau with parks and other green spaces. The site also features a reconstructed castle, bridges and an arboretum.
Naumburg Cathedral	Naumburg Cathedral of St. Peter and St. Paul.	Naumburg, Germany; 51°9′17″N 11°48′14″E	Cultural: (i), (ii)	1.82 (4.5)	2018	
Van Nellefabriek	A white, modern building	Rotterdam, Netherlands; 51°55′24″N 4°25′6″E	Cultural: (ii), (iv)	6.94 (17.1)	2014	The factory was built in the 1920s as an "ideal factory", embracing the modernist and functionalist style of architecture. It was built of steel and glass with a large glass curtain wall to allow light fill the space. .
Neolithic Flint Mines at Spiennes (Mons)	A black and white drawing showing the underground and surface excavations in a flint bearing chalk	Spiennes, Belgium; 50°25′51″N 3°58′44″E	Cultural: (i), (iii), (iv)	172 (430)	2000	The Neolithic flint mines at Spiennes are the largest and earliest concentration of ancient mines in Europe. They are also remarkable for the diversity of innovations used in mining and due to a nearby Neolithic settlement.
New Lanark	Several red brick factory buildings on the banks of a river which makes a hairpin turn. The buildings are surrounded by mountains and forest.	Lanark, Scotland, United Kingdom; 55°39′48″N 3°46′59″W	Cultural: (ii), (iv), (vi)	146 (360)	2001	Prompted by Richard Arkwright's factory system developed in the Derwent Valley, the community of New Lanark was created to provide housing for workers at the mills. Philanthropist Robert Owen bought the site and turned it into a model community, providing public facilities, education, and supporting factory reform.
Nice, Winter Resort Town of the Riviera		Alpes-Maritimes, France 43°42′12″N 7°15′59″E	Cultural: (ii)	522 (1,290); buffer zone 4,243 (10,480)	2021	
Nord-Pas de Calais Mining Basin	A photochrome showing a large factory with two imposing smokestacks surrounded by bare landscape and miners houses.	Nord-Pas de Calais, France; 50°27′45″N 3°32′46″E	Cultural: (ii), (iv), (vi)	3,943 (9,740)	2012	
Notre-Dame Cathedral in Tournai	A grey stone cathedral with a central square tower flanked by 4 square towers. Surrounded by the red roofs of the old city.	Tournai, Belgium; 50°36′22″N 3°23′21″E	Cultural: (ii), (iv)	0.5 (1.2)	2000	The Cathedral of Notre-Dame in Tournai was built in the first half of the 12th century. The nave, transept and towers are all in the romanesque style. The choir was rebuilt in the following century in the gothic style. It is one of Wallonia's major heritage sites.
Old City of Bern	Bern's old city as seen from across the Aare River	Bern, Switzerland; 46°56′53″N 7°27′1″E	Cultural: (iii)	84,684 (209,260)	1983	Founded in the 12th century on a hill site surrounded by the Aare River, Bern developed along the peninsula. Following a devastating fire, the entire town was rebuilt in a unified style. The early wooden buildings were replaced with sandstone, followed by arcades in the 15th century, arcades and fountains in the 16th century. The medieval town was rebuilt in the 18th century, but retained its earlier character.
Old and New Towns of Edinburgh	A line of gray 4 to 6 story row houses from the right, lead to a gray stone church with a single tower.	Edinburgh, Scotland, United Kingdom; 55°57′0″N 3°13′0″W	Cultural: (ii), (iv)	—	1995	The Old Town of Edinburgh was founded in the Middle Ages, and the New Town was developed in 1767–1890. It contrasts the layout of settlements in the medieval and modern periods. The layout and architecture of the new town, whose designers include William Chambers and William Playfair, influenced European urban design in the 18th and 19th centuries.
Old town of Regensburg with Stadtamhof	Several early modern or medieval townhouses. From right to left, a pale green house, a large red house filling most of the picture, and a white house.	Regensburg, Germany; 49°1′14″N 12°5′57″E	Cultural: (ii), (iii), (iv)	183 (450)	2006	This medieval town contains many notable buildings that span almost two millennia and include ancient Roman, Romanesque and Gothic buildings. Regensburg's 11th- to 13th-century architecture created a town of narrow, dark lanes flanked by tall buildings and surrounded by a city wall. It includes medieval patrician houses and towers, a large number of churches and monasteries as well as the 12th-century Old Bridge. Regensburg was a center of the Holy Roman Empire that turned to Protestantism.
Palace and Gardens of Schönbrunn	Rococo three- and four-story palace stretches across most of the midground. In the foreground are manacured lawns and walkways, while the background is the old city of Vienna with a cathedral on the horizon.	Vienna, Austria; 48°11′12″N 16°18′48″E	Cultural: (i), (iv)	186 (460)	1996	The residence of the Habsburg emperors from the 18th century to 1918. It was built in the rococo style as a single, unified project. It was designed by the architects Johann Bernhard Fischer von Erlach and Nicolaus Pacassi and was the site of the world's first zoo.
Palace and Park of Fontainebleau	A long three- and four-story ornate building with manicured lawns in front.	Fontainebleau, France; 48°24′7″N 2°41′53″E	Cultural: (ii), (vi)	144 (360)	1981	Used by the kings of France from the 12th century, the medieval royal hunting lodge of Fontainebleau was transformed, enlarged and embellished in the 16th century by François I, who wanted to make a 'New Rome' of it. Surrounded by an immense park, the Italianate palace combines Renaissance and French artistic elements.
Palace and Park of Versailles	A courtyard with two wings of the ornate, two-story brick-and-stone palace coming from the right and left with the third side of the palace in the center.	Versailles, France; 48°48′18″N 2°7′10″E	Cultural: (i), (ii), (vi)	1,070 (2,600)	1979	The Palace of Versailles was the principal residence of French kings Louis XIV, Louis XV, and Louis XVI. Embellished by several generations of architects, sculptors, decorators and landscape architects, it provided Europe with a model of the ideal royal residence for over a century.
Palaces and Parks of Potsdam and Berlin	Single story pale yellow ornate palace stretching from the left foreground to the right background.	Berlin, Potsdam, Germany; 52°23′59″N 13°1′59″E	Cultural: (i), (ii), (iv)	2,064 (5,100)	1990	This site contains 500 ha (1,200 acres) of parks and 150 buildings constructed between 1730 and 1916. It extends into the district of Berlin-Zehlendorf, with the palaces and parks lining the banks of the River Havel and Lake Glienicke. Voltaire stayed at the Sans-Souci Palace, built under Frederick II between 1745 and 1747.
The Palaces of King Ludwig II of Bavaria: Neuschwanstein, Linderhof, Schachen and Herrenchiemsee		Hohenschwangau, Ettal, Garmisch-Partenkirchen, Herreninsel Germany 47°33′27″N 10°44′58″E	Cultural: (iv)	75.875 (187.49); buffer zone 10,616 (26,230)	2025	
Paris, Banks of the Seine	The Seine River flows around an island with a gray stone gothic cathedral rising above the island.	Paris, France; 48°51′30″N 2°17′39″E	Cultural: (i), (ii), (iv)	365 (900)	1991	The river Seine runs through the heart of Paris. The banks of the river are lined with many of Paris' most famous sites including the Louvre, the Eiffel Tower, the Place de la Concorde, the Cathedral of Notre-Dame, the Sainte Chapelle and the Grand and Petit Palais. The architecture and Haussmann's design with wide squares and boulevards influenced late 19th- and 20th-century town planning all over the world.
Pilgrimage Church of Wies	Ornate church interior, looking toward the entrance. The interior is white, the doors flanked by two pairs of columns which stretch to the richly painted ceiling. Above the entrance is the church's pipe organ.	Steingaden, Germany; 47°40′53″N 10°54′1″E	Cultural: (i), (iii)	0.1 (0.25)	1983	The Church of Wies (1745–54) is the work of architect Dominikus Zimmermann and is a masterpiece of the Bavarian Rococo.
Place Stanislas, Place de la Carrière and Place d'Alliance in Nancy	Ornate stone buildings with one two-story building from the left, foreground to the left midground. A two-story building covers the background.	Nancy, France; 48°41′37″N 6°10′59″E	Cultural: (i), (iv)	7 (17)	1983	Nancy is the oldest example of a capital city built as a unified whole and on modern principles. It was built between 1752 and 1756 by a brilliant team led by the architect Héré and is famous for the harmonious suite of axial spaces he developed, extending from the Place Stanislas to the Palais du Gouvernement.
Plantin-Moretus House-Workshops-Museum Complex	Library with dark wood bookcases and scattered stone busts.	Antwerp, Belgium; 51°13′6″N 4°23′52″E	Cultural: (ii), (iii), (iv), (vi)	0.23 (0.57)	2005	The Plantin-Moretus Museum is a printing plant and publishing house dating from the Renaissance and Baroque periods. It is associated with the history of the invention and spread of typography. Its name refers to the greatest printer-publisher of the second half of the 16th century: Christophe Plantin (c. 1520–89). The museum contains a collection made up of the work of the most prolific printing and publishing house in Europe in the late 16th century. The building of the company, which remained in activity until 1867, contains a large collection of old printing equipment, an extensive library, archives and works of art, among them a painting by Rubens.
Pontcysyllte Aqueduct and Canal	Looking up toward a metal aqueduct, supported by multiple tall, stone pillars and arches.	Wrexham, Wales, United Kingdom; 52°58′13″N 3°5′16″W	Cultural: (i), (ii), (iv)	105 (260)	2009	The aqueduct was built to carry the Ellesmere Canal over the Dee Valley. Completed during the Industrial Revolution and designed by Thomas Telford, the aqueduct made innovative use of cast and wrought iron, influencing civil engineering across the world.
Pont du Gard (Roman Aqueduct)	A stone aqueduct consisting of three levels with many arches crosses a river.	Vers-Pont-du-Gard, France; 43°56′50″N 4°32′7″E	Cultural: (i), (iii), (iv)	0.33 (0.82)	1985	The Pont du Gard was built shortly before the Christian era in Rome to allow the aqueduct of Nîmes (which is almost 50 km (31 mi) long) to cross the Gard river. The Roman architects and hydraulic engineers who designed this bridge created a technical as well as an artistic masterpiece. The bridge stands almost 50 m (160 ft) high and is on three levels with the longest measuring 275 m (902 ft).
Prehistoric Pile Dwellings around the Alps	Reconstruction of a pile house at the Pfahlbau Museum Unteruhldingen on Lake Constance in Germany	Austria*, France*, Germany*, Italy*, Slovenia*, Switzerland*; 47°16′42″N 8°12′27″E	Cultural: (iv), (v)	3,961 (9,790)	2011	Contains 111 small individual sites with the remains of prehistoric pile-dwelling (or stilt house) settlements in and around the Alps built from around 5000 to 500 BC on the edges of lakes, rivers or wetlands. While only some of the sites have been excavated, they contain a wealth of information on life and trade in agrarian Neolithic and Bronze Age cultures in Alpine Europe. Fifty-six of the sites are located in Switzerland.
Prehistoric Sites and Decorated Caves of the Vézère Valley	Cave painting of a dun horse.	Lascaux, France; 45°3′27″N 1°10′12″E	Cultural: (i), (iii)	—	1979	The Vézère valley contains 147 prehistoric sites dating from the Palaeolithic and 25 decorated caves. The most interesting discoveries are the cave paintings, especially those of the Lascaux Cave, whose discovery in 1940 was of great importance for the history of prehistoric art. The hunting scenes show some 100 animal figures with remarkable color and detail.
Provins, Town of Medieval Fairs	A grey stone castle rises above a stone retaining wall. The central, octagonal tower is flanked by two round towers.	Provins, France; 48°33′35″N 3°17′56″E	Cultural: (ii), (iv)	108 (270)	2001	The fortified medieval town of Provins is situated in the former territory of the powerful Counts of Champagne. It was a center of international trading fairs and the wool industry. Many parts of the town were built especially for the fairs and markets.
Pyrénées – Mont Perdu	Monte Perdido (left) and Cilindro de Marboré (right)	Hautes-Pyrénées and Province of Huesca, France*; Spain*; 42°41′8″N 0°0′2″E	Mixed: (iii), (iv), (v), (vii), (viii)	30,639 (75,710)	1997	This mountain landscape, which crosses the French and Spanish borders is centred around the peak of Mount Perdu. Mount Perdu is a calcareous massif that rises to 3,352 m (10,997 ft). The site includes two of Europe's largest and deepest canyons on the Spanish side and three major cirque valleys on the French side. In addition to the mountains, the site includes the cultural lifestyle of the seasonal herding migration in the mountains. This was one a common a way of life in the mountain valleys in Europe, but now mostly survives only in isolated areas such as this region in the Pyrénées.
Rhaetian Railway in the Albula / Bernina Landscapes	The Glacier Express train in the Albula Valley.	Graubünden and Tirano, Italy*; Switzerland*; 46°29′54″N 9°50′47″E	Cultural: (ii) (iv)	109,386 (270,300)	2008	The Rhaetian Railway in the Albula / Bernina Landscapes, brings together two historic railway lines that cross the Swiss Alps through those two passes. The railways provided a rapid and easy route into many formerly isolated alpine settlements. Building the railroads required overcoming a number of technical challenges with bridges and tunnels.
Rietveld Schröderhuis (Rietveld Schröder House)	Modern house of white and grey flat, angular concrete surfaces. The modern house is attached to several older, traditional houses.	Utrecht, Netherlands; 52°5′7″N 5°8′50″E	Cultural: (i), (ii)	—	2000	The Rietveld Schröder House in Utrecht was built in 1924. A small family house with flexible interior rooms and a unique exterior. It is an example of the De Stijl group of artists and architects from the 1920s, and is an example of the Modern Movement in architecture.
Roman Monuments, Cathedral of St Peter and Church of Our Lady in Trier	Ruins of brick bath house, only one wall and about a dozen arches are still visible	Trier, Germany; 49°45′0″N 6°37′59″E	Cultural: (i)(iii), (iv), (vi)	—	1986	The Roman colony at Trier was founded in the 1st century AD. It grew into a major town and became one of the capitals of the Tetrarchy at the end of the 3rd century. Many of the Roman era structures are still standing in Trier. The cathedral is the oldest church in Germany, being built on the ruins of Roman buildings by Maximin of Trier in 329–346.
Roman Theatre and its Surroundings and the "Triumphal Arch" of Orange	A mostly intact Roman amphitheater with a large wall behind the stage.	Orange, France; 44°8′9″N 4°48′30″E	Cultural: (iii), (vi)	9.45 (23.4)	1981	The ancient theatre of Orange, is one of the best preserved of all the great Roman theatres. The theatre features an intact 103 m (338 ft) facade. The Roman arch was built between A.D. 10 and 25 as a triumphal arch during the reign of Augustus.
Routes of Santiago de Compostela in France	A cathedral in white stone. The west façade has a single entrance with a monumental rose window above it. The entrance and rose window are flanked on each side by a gothic bell tower and spire.	France; 45°11′3″N 0°43′23″E	Cultural: (ii), (iv), (vi)	—	1998	The site consists of a number of churches and hospitals that are places related to the pilgrimage to Santiago de Compostela in Western Spain, a part of the Way of Saint James.
Royal Botanic Gardens, Kew	A large greenhouse with rounded ends and sides sits in the middle of groomed grass and flower beds.	London, England, United Kingdom; 51°28′55″N 0°17′39″E	Cultural: (ii), (iii), (iv)	132 (330)	2003	Created in 1759, the influential Kew Gardens were designed by Charles Bridgeman, William Kent, Capability Brown, and William Chambers. The gardens were used to study botany and ecology and furthered the understanding of the subjects.
From the Great Saltworks of Salins-les-Bains to the Royal Saltworks of Arc-et-Senans, the Production of Open-pan Salt	A large neo-classical white stone building, the triangular pediment is supported by six rough pillars.	Arc-et-Senans, Salins-les-Bains, France; 46°56′15″N 5°52′35″E	Cultural: (i), (ii), (iv)	10.48 (25.9)	1982	This site consists of two open pan saltworks. The Royal Saltworks of Arc-et-Senans was built in 1775 during the reign of Louis XVI. It was built according to the principles of the Enlightenment, with a rational organization and layout. The other site, the Great Saltworks of Salins-les-Bains was active for at least 1200 years until stopping activity in 1962. The Saltworks of Salins has an underground gallery from the 13th century along with a 19th-century hydraulic pump and a boiler house. From 1780 to 1895, its salt water traveled through 21 km (13 mi) of wood pipes to the Royal Saltworks of Arc-et-Senans.
Saltaire	A three-story pale-red brick building along the left side of a small river. The building has a bell tower rising out of the middle of it.	City of Bradford, England, United Kingdom; 53°50′21″N 1°47′18″W	Cultural: (ii), (iv)	20 (49)	2001	Saltaire was founded by mill-owner Titus Salt as a model village for his workers. The site, which includes the Salts Mill, featured public buildings for the inhabitants and was an example of 19th century paternalism.
Sceilg Mhichíl	Three beehive shaped dry-stone huts surround a worn statue or cross	County Kerry, Ireland; 51°46′19″N 10°32′19″W	Cultural: (iii), (iv)	22 (54)	1996	The monastery at Skellig Michael is from the 7th century. It is located on the rocky island of Skellig Michael, some 12 km (7.5 mi) off the coast of south-west Ireland. It shows the harsh and spartan lives of the first Irish Christians.
Schokland and Surroundings	About 10 small buildings of dark wood with steeply peaked red roofs. In the center is a larger building with a grey roof and a small clock tower.	Noordoostpolder, Netherlands; 52°38′19″N 5°46′18″E	Cultural: (iii), (v)	1,306 (3,230)	1995	Schokland was a peninsula on the Zuider Zee that became an island by the 15th century. When the waters rose, it was abandoned in 1859. However, after the draining of the Zuider Zee in the 1940s, it was once again repopulated.
Schwerin Residence Ensemble		Schwerin, Mecklenburg-Vorpommern, Germany 53°37′27″N 11°25′08″E	Cultural: (iv)	2,276 (5,620); buffer zone 2,692 (6,650)	2024	
Semmering railway	A photochorm picture of the a curving railroad bridge coming out of a tunnel bored into a large mountain. In the background another bridge and mountains are visible.	Gloggnitz, Simmering in Styria, Austria; 47°38′56″N 15°49′41″E	Cultural: (ii), (iv)	156 (390)	1998	The Semmering Railway, was built between 1848 and 1854 and covers 41 km (25 mi) of rugged mountains. This project was undertaken in the early days of railroad construction and required a number of innovations. The tunnels, viaducts and other works are still in use today.
Seventeenth-Century Canal Ring Area of Amsterdam inside the Singelgracht	An aerial view of a cramped city, clearly spaced by hexagonal bodies of water.	Amsterdam, Netherlands; 52°21′54″N 4°53′16″E	Cultural: (i), (ii), (iv)	198 (490)	2010	By strategically draining the swamp land surrounding the port city via canal digging, Amsterdam quickly became a force in long-term city-planning, filling concentric voids with housing and infrastructure that would later accommodate the influx of free-thinking Europeans who help the city prosper.
ShUM Sites of Speyer, Worms and Mainz		Rhineland-Palatinate, Germany 49°18′58″N 8°26′22″E	Cultural: (ii), (iii), (vi)	5.56 (13.7); buffer zone 16.43 (40.6)	2021	
The Slate Landscape of Northwest Wales		Several sites in Wales, United Kingdom 53°07′15″N 4°06′54″W	Cultural: (ii), (iv)	3,259 (8,050)	2021	
Speicherstadt and Kontorhaus District with Chilehaus	Aerial view of the district, with its houses and canals.	Hamburg, Germany; 53°32′36″N 9°59′31″E	Cultural: (iv)	26 (64)	2015	The district's name means "warehouse district" in German. Located in the port of Hamburg, it is the largest warehouse district in the world where the buildings stand on timber-pile foundations, oak logs, in this particular case. It was built from 1883 to 1927, as a free zone to transfer goods without paying customs.
Speyer Cathedral	Looking toward the choir of a brick Romanesque cathedral. The twin bell towers, the transept crossing dome, and the roof are green copper.	Speyer, Germany; 49°19′0″N 8°26′35″E	Cultural: (ii)	—	1981	The romanesque Speyer Cathedral, was founded by Conrad II in 1030 and remodelled at the end of the 11th century. It was one of the grandest romanesque cathedrals in the Holy Roman Empire and the burial place of German emperors for almost 300 years.
St Kilda	A rocky bay with stone ruins in the foreground. The ocean enters the picture from the left and across the bay several rocky crags are visible sticking out the sea.	St Kilda, Scotland, United Kingdom; 57°49′2″N 8°34′36″W	Mixed: (iii), (v), (vii), (ix), (x)	24,201 (59,800)	1986	Although inhabited for over 2,000 years, the isolated archipelago of St Kilda has had no permanent residents since 1930. The islands' human heritage includes various unique architectural features from the historic and prehistoric periods. St Kilda is also a breeding ground for many important seabird species including the world's largest colony of gannets and up to 136,000 pairs of puffins.
St Mary's Cathedral and St Michael's Church at Hildesheim	A romanesque stone cathedral, view of the side chapels and transept. The green copper dome over the transept crossing is visible.	Hildesheim, Germany; 52°9′10″N 9°56′38″E	Cultural: (i), (ii), (iii)	0.58 (1.4)	1985	The site consists of two churches in Hildesheim. The Ottonian romanesque St Michael's Church was built between 1010 and 1020. Inside it is decorated with a notable wooden ceiling, painted stucco-work, and the Bernward Column. The treasures of the Romanesque Hildesheim Cathedral contain the Bernward Doors, the Hezilo chandelier and the Azelin chandelier.
Stoclet House		Brussels, Belgium; 50°50′6″N 4°24′58″E	Cultural: (i), (ii)	0.86 (2.1)	2009	This house was built by the architect Josef Hoffmann for the banker Adolphe Stoclet starting in 1905. The house and garden were completed in 1911 and the angular undecorated design marked a turning point in Art Nouveau movement. The house is an excellent example of the Vienna Secession movement in art and architecture. The house is decorated with works by Koloman Moser and Gustav Klimt.
Stonehenge, Avebury and Associated Sites	A ring of standing stones some with lintels stands in the middle of a green field	Wiltshire, England, United Kingdom; 51°10′44″N 1°49′31″W	Cultural: (i), (ii), (iii)	4,985 (12,320)	1986	The Neolithic sites of Avebury and Stonehenge are two of the largest and most famous megalithic monuments in the world. They relate to man's interaction with his environment. The purpose of the henges has been a source of speculation, with suggestions ranging from ceremonial to interpreting the cosmos. "Associated sites" includes Silbury Hill, Beckhampton Avenue, and West Kennet Avenue.
Strasbourg, Grande île and Neustadt	A pair of rectangular medieval stone towers guard both banks of a river and the stone bridge that stretches between them.	Strasbourg, France; 48°34′53″N 7°43′48″E	Cultural: (i), (ii), (iv)	183 (450); buffer zone 708 (1,750)	1988 (Note: Extended in 2017 to include the new town and name change from Strasbourg - Grande île to the present name.)	The Grande Ile (Big Island) is the historic center of the Alsatian capital and includes a number of historic buildings. Some of the most notable include the cathedral, the four ancient churches and the Palais Rohan (the former residence of the prince-bishops).
Studley Royal Park including the Ruins of Fountains Abbey	The ruins of a large abbey and church. The walls are mostly intact, though the roof has fallen in and been removed.	North Yorkshire, England, United Kingdom; 54°6′58″N 1°34′23″W	Cultural: (i), (iv)	309 (760)	1986	Before the dissolution of the monasteries in the mid-16th century, Fountains Abbey was one of the largest and richest Cistercian abbeys in Britain and is one of only a few that survives from the 12th century. The later garden, which incorporates the abbey, survives to a large extent in its original design and influenced garden design in Europe.
Swiss Alps Jungfrau-Aletsch	A range of tall, snowy mountains.	Cantons of Bern and Valais, Switzerland; 46°30′0″N 8°1′59″E	Natural: (vii), (viii), (ix)	82,400 (204,000)	2007	The site includes several of the highest mountains in the Central Alps along with the largest glacier in Eurasia. The landscape provides information on the succession of plants after the retreat of a glacier and allows study of the retreat of glaciers resulting from climate change. The impressive landscape has also played an important role in European art, literature, mountaineering and tourism.
Swiss Tectonic Arena Sardona	Martinsloch (Martins hole) is visible in the center of the Tschingelhörner in the Glarus Alps	Glarus, St. Gallen and Graubünden, Switzerland; 46°55′0″N 9°15′0″E	Natural: (viii)	32,850 (81,200)	2008	The Swiss Tectonic Arena Sardona in the north-eastern part of the country covers a mountainous area which features seven peaks that rise above 3,000 m (9,800 ft). The area displays an exceptional example of mountain building through continental collision and displays a clear example of tectonic thrust, i.e. the process whereby older, deeper rocks are carried onto younger, shallower rocks. The site has been a key site for the geological sciences since the 18th century.
Three Castles, Defensive Wall and Ramparts of the Market-Town of Bellinzona	Montebello and Sasso Corbaro castles above Bellinzona	Bellinzona, Switzerland; 46°11′35″N 9°1′21″E	Cultural: (iv)	5 (12)	2000	The Bellinzona site consists of a group of fortifications grouped around the castle of Castelgrande, which stands on a rocky peak looking out over the entire Ticino valley. Running from the castle, a series of fortified walls protect the ancient town and block the passage through the valley. A second castle (Montebello) forms an integral part of the fortifications, while a third but separate castle (Sasso Corbaro) was built on an isolated rocky promontory south-east of the other fortifications.
Tower of London	A stone castle with four towers rises above a gatehouse and other walls.	London, England, United Kingdom; 51°30′29″N 0°4′34″W	Cultural: (ii), (iv)	—	1988	Begun by William the Conqueror in 1066 during the Norman Conquest of England, the Tower of London is a symbol of power and an example of Norman military architecture that spread across England. Additions by Henry III and Edward I in the 13th century made the castle one of the most influential buildings of its kind in England.
Town Hall and Roland on the Marketplace of Bremen	A dark stone gothic building in a paved town square.	Bremen, Germany; 53°4′34″N 8°48′27″E	Cultural: (iii), (iv), (vi)	0.29 (0.72)	2004	The site consists of the Town Hall and the statue of Roland that stands near the town hall. The town hall was built in the 15th century when Bremen joined the Hanseatic League. It was renovated in the 17th century and a new Town Hall was built nearby in the early 20th. Under the Holy Roman Empire, Bremen had extensive autonomy which allowed the town to grow and made the town hall a center of power. Both the old and new Town Halls survived bombings during World War II. The statue of Roland was built in 1404. It stands 5.5 m (18 ft) high.
Town of Bamberg	A stone cathedral with two towers on the west façade and two towers flanking the choir, all four towers are topped with slender, pointed metal roofs.	Bamberg, Germany; 49°53′30″N 10°53′20″E	Cultural: (ii)(iv)	142 (350)	1993	In 1007, Bamberg became the center of a dioesce that was intended to help spread Christianity to the Slavs. During the 12th century the Bishops of Bamberg began a program of monumental public construction. The architecture that developed influenced construction in northern Germany and Hungary. In the 18th century it became a center of the Enlightenment when writers such as Hegel and Hoffmann settled in the town.
Upper Middle Rhine Valley	A river winds between high cliffs and hills, with a castle in the midground.	Rhineland-Palatinate, Hesse, Germany; 50°10′25″N 7°41′39″E	Cultural: (ii), (iv), (v)	27,250 (67,300)	2002	A 65 km (40 mi) stretch of the Middle Rhine Valley in Germany. The region is home to many castles, historic towns and vineyards and has been an inspirition for many writers, artists and composers.
Vézelay, Church and Hill	A grey stone church with a tower on the right side of the building.	Vézelay, France; 47°27′59″N 3°44′54″E	Cultural: (i), (vi)	183 (450)	1979	The Benedictine abbey of Vézelay has existed since the 9th century and has been an important pilgrimage site since that time. Bernard of Clairvaux preached the crowd into a frenzy to start the Second Crusade in 1146 at Vézelay. Leaders in the Third Crusade Richard the Lion-Hearted and Philip II of France assembled at the abbey before they left on the Crusade.
Völklingen Ironworks	View from a train of numerous smoke stacks, tanks and pipes.	Völklingen, Germany; 49°14′40″N 6°50′59″E	Cultural: (ii), (iv)	6 (15)	1994	The recently closed ironworks are the only intact example in western Europe and North America of an intact ironworks built in the 19th and 20th centuries.
Wachau Cultural Landscape	A large oranate church with an enclosed forecourt. The west façade is topped by two towers and the transept crossing is topped by a large round tower. The entire building is decorated with horizontal white and yellow bands.	Wachau, Austria; 48°21′52″N 15°26′3″E	Cultural: (ii), (iv)	18,387 (45,440)	2000	The Wachau is a 40 km (25 mi) long valley along the Danube river between Melk and Krems. The valley was settled in prehistoric times and has been an important region since then. It is home to a number of historic towns, villages, monasteries, castles and ruins.
Wadden Sea		Denmark*, Germany*, Netherlands*; 53°31′43″N 8°33′22″E	Natural: (viii), (ix), (x)	968,393 (2,392,950)	2009 (Note: Expanded in 2011 to include the German Wadden Sea National Park of Hamburg and in 2014 to include the Danish part of the Wadden Sea.)	The Wadden Sea contains the Dutch Wadden Sea Conservation Area and the German Wadden Sea National Parks of Lower Saxony and Schleswig-Holstein. The coast line is generally flat and has may mudflats, marshes and dunes. The site covers two-thirds of the entire Wadden Sea and is home to many plant and animal species. It is a breeding ground for up to 12 million birds annually and supports more than 10 percent of the population of 29 species. Was expanded in 2011 to include the German Wadden Sea National Park of Hamburg and in 2014 to include the Danish part of the Wadden Sea.
Wartburg Castle	A castle perched along the edge of a wooded hill. The castle has grown in several stages and consists of sections in dark stone, lighter stone, white plaster and half-timber.	Eisenach, Germany; 50°58′0″N 10°18′25″E	Cultural: (iii), (vi)	—	1999	Wartburg Castle is located on a 410 m (1230 ft) precipice above Eisenach. It expanded in several sections and only a few of the medieval structures still remain. The castle was rebuilt in the 19th century to its present appearance. Martin Luther translated the New Testament into German while in exile at Wartburg.
Water Management System of Augsburg	A white power plant with numerous windows with water flowing below the building	Augsburg, Germany; 48°21′56″N 10°54′07″E	Cultural: (ii), (iv)	112 (280)	2019	The water systems of Augsburg were built between the 14th century and today. A network of canals, water towers, pumping equipment and hydroelectric power stations have provided drinking water and power for the city for centuries.
Westminster Palace, Westminster Abbey and Saint Margaret's Church	Neo-gothic Westminister palace and Big Ben clock tower stand above a river and bridge.	London, England, United Kingdom; 51°29′59″N 0°7′43″W	Cultural: (i), (ii), (iv)	10 (25)	1987	The site has been involved in the administration of England since the 11th century, and later the United Kingdom. Since the coronation of William the Conqueror, all English and British monarchs have been crowned at Westminster Abbey. Westminster Palace, home to the British Parliament, is an example of Gothic Revival architecture; St Margaret's Church is the palace's parish church, and although it pre-dates the palace and was built in the 11th century, it has been rebuilt since.
Würzburg Residence with the Court Gardens and Residence Square	An ornate building on the left side of the picture. In the midground the center of the building projects out, with columns surrounding the main entrance. The right side of the picture is covered in gardens.	Würzburg, Germany; 49°47′34″N 9°56′20″E	Cultural: (i), (iv)	15 (37)	1981	The large and ornate Baroque palace was created under the patronage of the prince-bishops Lothar Franz and Friedrich Carl von Schönborn. It is one of the largest palaces in Germany.
Zollverein Coal Mine Industrial Complex in Essen	A orange metal tower with several flywheels above a building with Zollverein written in golden gothic script letters.	Essen, Germany; 51°29′29″N 7°2′46″E	Cultural: (ii), (iii)	—	2001	The Zollverein industrial complex in Nordrhein-Westfalen contains all the equipment of a historic coal mine which started operation about 150 years ago. Some of the 20th-century buildings are also notable.

== See also ==
- List of World Heritage Sites in Austria
- List of World Heritage Sites in Belgium
- List of World Heritage Sites in France
- List of World Heritage Sites in Germany
- List of World Heritage Sites in the Netherlands
- List of World Heritage Sites in Ireland
- List of World Heritage Sites in Switzerland
- List of World Heritage Sites in the United Kingdom
