= List of World Heritage Sites in Germany =

Location of World Heritage Sites within Germany. Blue dots indicate the sites of the Caves and Ice Age Art in the Swabian Jura, green are the prehistoric pile dwellings around the Alps, orange are the beech forests, gray are the sites of the Wadden Sea, and purple are the Palaces of King Ludwig II of Bavaria. Berlin, Speyer, and Weimar each have more than one site. The sites of the Frontiers of the Roman Empire are represented by black dots.

The United Nations Educational, Scientific and Cultural Organization (UNESCO) designates World Heritage Sites of outstanding universal value to cultural or natural heritage which have been nominated by countries signatories to the UNESCO World Heritage Convention, established in 1972. Cultural heritage consists of monuments (such as architectural works, monumental sculptures, or inscriptions), groups of buildings, and sites (including archaeological sites). Natural features (consisting of physical and biological formations), geological and physiographical formations (including habitats of threatened species of animals and plants), and natural sites which are important from the point of view of science, conservation or natural beauty, are defined as natural heritage. As Germany was divided following World War II, West and East Germany ratified the convention separately, the former on 23 August 1976 and the latter on 12 December 1988. With German reunification, East Germany was dissolved on 3 October 1990.

Germany has 55 sites on the list, with a further eleven on the tentative list. The first site listed was the Aachen Cathedral in 1978. The most recent addition took place in 2025. Three sites are natural and 52 are listed for their cultural significance. Germany holds the third-highest number of World Heritage Sites in the world, after Italy and China with 61 and 60 sites, respectively, and the second most in terms of cultural significance. The Dresden Elbe Valley, which was listed as endangered in July 2006, was eventually delisted in June 2009, making it one of the only three sites in the world to have been removed from the World Heritage Site register. Cologne Cathedral was listed as endangered from 2006 to 2008 due to plans to construct high-rise buildings nearby that would threaten the integrity of the property. Nine sites are shared with other countries.

== World Heritage Sites ==
UNESCO lists sites under ten criteria; each entry must meet at least one of the criteria. Criteria i through vi are cultural, and vii through x are natural.

* Transnational site

World Heritage Sites
| Site | Image | Location (state) | Year listed | UNESCO data | Description |
|---|---|---|---|---|---|
| Aachen Cathedral | A Gothic, castle-like building, located in a rural area and surrounded by several trees | North Rhine-Westphalia | 1978 | 3bis; i, ii, iv, vi (cultural) | Constructed under the rule of Charlemagne between 793 and 813 during the Carolingian Renaissance and becoming his burial place when he died in 814, the cathedral's Palatine Chapel became the first vaulted structure built since antiquity. Strongly influenced by Classical and Byzantine architecture, it in turn became the inspiration for numerous churches of the Middle Ages. Until 1531, the cathedral served as the place where German kings were crowned. A minor boundary modification took place in 2013. |
| Speyer Cathedral | Looking toward the choir of a brick Romanesque cathedral. The twin bell towers, the transept crossing dome, and the roof are green copper | Rhineland-Palatinate | 1981 | 168; ii (cultural) | The cathedral of Speyer was founded in 1030 by Conrad II and reconstructed at the end of the 11th century by Henry IV. One of the most significant examples of Romanesque architecture in Europe, it influenced the development of architecture in the 11th and 12th centuries. It served as a burial place of German emperors for almost 300 years. It was seriously damaged by fire in 1689. The restoration works in the 18th century, closely following the original structure, are one of the earliest examples of monument preservation in Europe. |
| Würzburg Residence with the Court Gardens and Residence Square | A large Baroque palace with a flower garden in front | Bavaria | 1981 | 169bis; i, iv (cultural) | The large and ornate Baroque palace, one of the largest in Germany, was created under the patronage of the prince-bishops Lothar Franz and Friedrich Carl von Schönborn. Completed in 1744 with decorations and gardens added in the following decades, the complex is the work of some of the most prominent European architects and artists of the period, including the chief architect Balthasar Neumann and the Venetian painter Tiepolo who created the frescoes in the staircases and on the walls of the Imperial Hall. A minor boundary modification took place in 2010. |
| Pilgrimage Church of Wies | An aerial photo of a church in a countryside setting | Bavaria | 1983 | 271bis; i, iii (cultural) | Constructed in 1745–54 in an Alpine valley to attract pilgrims following an alleged miracle at the site, the church is the work of architect Dominikus Zimmermann and is a masterpiece of the Bavarian Rococo. It is richly decorated in various techniques, including stucco, sculptures, paintings, and ironwork, which all blend harmoniously into the structure. A minor boundary modification took place in 2011. |
| Castles of Augustusburg and Falkenlust at Brühl | A front view of a large Rococo palace with a road in front | North Rhine-Westphalia | 1984 | 288; ii, iv (cultural) | The Augustusburg Castle (pictured), the residence of the prince-archbishops of Cologne, and the Falkenlust hunting lodge are both examples of early German Rococo architecture from the first half of the 18th century. They are a prominent example of a large princely residence of the period and served as a model for other similar complexes. |
| St Mary's Cathedral and St Michael's Church at Hildesheim | A romanesque stone cathedral, view of the north side. The green copper dome over the transept crossing is visible. | Lower Saxony | 1985 | 187bis; i, ii, iii (cultural) | The site consists of two churches in Hildesheim. The Ottonian Romanesque St Michael's Church was built between 1010 and 1020. Inside it is decorated with a notable wooden ceiling, painted stucco-work, and the Bernward Column. The treasures of the Romanesque Hildesheim Cathedral (pictured) contain the Bernward Doors, the Hezilo chandelier, and the Azelin chandelier. A minor boundary modification took place in 2008. |
| Roman Monuments, Cathedral of St Peter and Church of Our Lady in Trier | Roman city gate, surrounded by later-era buildings | Rhineland-Palatinate | 1986 | 367; i, iii, iv, vi (cultural) | The Roman colony at Trier was founded in the 1st century. It grew into a major town and became one of the capitals of the Tetrarchy at the end of the 3rd century, also nicknamed "the second Rome". Many of the Roman era structures are still standing, including the Porta Nigra (pictured). The Cathedral is the oldest church in Germany, being built on the ruins of Roman buildings with parts in Romanesque and later styles. The Church of Our Lady was built in the French High Gothic style. |
| Hanseatic City of Lübeck | Medieval gate in red brick with two pointy towers | Schleswig-Holstein | 1987 | 272bis; iv (cultural) | Founded in the 12th century, Lübeck was the trading capital of the influential Hanseatic League, which monopolised trade in much of Northern Europe until the 16th century. Although a fifth of the city, including several important monuments, was entirely destroyed in World War II, several of the original buildings remain. These include the residences from the 15th and 16th centuries, the Holsten gate (pictured), churches, and the salt storehouses. A minor boundary modification took place in 2009. |
| Palaces and Parks of Potsdam and Berlin | Single story pale yellow ornate palace stretching from the left foreground to the right background | Berlin, Brandenburg | 1990 | 532ter; i, ii, iv (cultural) | The cultural landscape with palaces, gardens, artificial villages, villas, and other buildings from the 18th and 19th centuries was created for Prussian monarchs by a series of landscape architects from different countries, resulting in an eclectic mixture of styles. After the inscription, additional areas were added to the site in 1992 and 1999. The Sanssouci palace is pictured. |
| Abbey and Altenmünster of Lorsch | A stand-alone gatehouse surrounded by trees. | Hesse | 1991 | 515bis; i, ii, iv (cultural) | The abbey was founded around 764 and served as a burial place for several kings of the Carolingian dynasty, starting with Louis the German who died in 876. The gatehouse (pictured) is one of the rare buildings that preserve most of the original look from the Carolingian Renaissance, including the sculptures and paintings. The rest of the monastery saw several renovations after a fire in 1090. |
| Mines of Rammelsberg, Historic Town of Goslar and Upper Harz Water Management System | A view at a town with houses with red roofs and a church with two bell towers | Lower Saxony | 1992 | 623ter; i, ii, iii, iv (cultural) | The Rammelsberg mountain is rich in silver, copper, and lead ore. Mining started on a smaller scale in the Middle Ages and then on a large scale between the 16th and 19th centuries. The town of Goslar (pictured) profited from it and was an important part of the Hanseatic League. The Medieval city centre with its timber-framed houses is well preserved. The water management system of the Upper Harz region was added to the site in 2010, to highlight the technological innovation in using water to assist the mining process. |
| Maulbronn Monastery Complex | Monastery courtyard with the gothic church on the left and monastery buildings on the right | Baden-Württemberg | 1993 | 546bis; ii, iv (cultural) | The Cistercian monastery was founded in 1147, with main buildings constructed between the 12th and 16th centuries. The church was built in a style that transitioned from Romanesque to Gothic architecture and was influential in the spread of the Gothic style in central and northern Europe. The monastery complex is one of the best preserved Cistercian complexes in Europe. An important feature is its water management system, with reservoirs, drains, and irrigation channels. |
| Town of Bamberg | A building on the middle section of a bridge | Bavaria | 1993 | 624; ii, iv (cultural) | Bamberg became the seat of a bishopric in 1007. The medieval layout of the city is well preserved, with its medieval and Baroque buildings, both secular and ecclesiastical. The layout and the architecture influenced the development of towns in central Europe from the 11th century on. In the late 18th century it became a center of the Age of Enlightenment when philosophers Georg Wilhelm Friedrich Hegel and E. T. A. Hoffmann settled in the town. The old town hall is pictured. |
| Collegiate Church, Castle, and Old Town of Quedlinburg | A town square with four visible buildings and a few tourists. | Saxony-Anhalt | 1994 | 535rev; iv (cultural) | An influential and prosperous trading centre during the early Middle Ages, Quedlinburg became a center of influence under the Ottonian dynasty in the 10th and 11th centuries. The Romanesque Collegiate Church, completed in 1129, is an important example of the period style, together with architectural details, tombs, and murals. The town saw another peak following the end of the Thirty Years' War. In the 17th century, numerous high-quality timber-framed houses were built, giving the town its present-day look. |
| Völklingen Ironworks | Ironworks machinery, including a chimney | Saarland | 1994 | 687; iv (cultural) | The ironworks operated until 1986 to produce pig iron. They illustrate the industrial history of Saarland, with its heavy industries, as well as numerous technological innovations developed there. They are the only intact remaining ironworks from the period of late 19th century and early 20th century in western Europe, as the last modifications to the complex were carried out in the 1930s. |
| Messel Pit Fossil Site | An open quarry pit in the middle of rolling, shrub covered hills | Hesse | 1994 | 720bis; viii (natural) | A former oil shale mine, the Messel pit is the world's richest fossil site for Eocene mammals. The fossils date from 47 to 48 million years ago and provide insight into the evolution of mammals, with remarkably well-preserved skeletons, skin, and even stomach content. This allowed for example a study of development of echolocation in bats. Fossils of primates, birds, insects, as well as plants have been found on site. |
| Bauhaus and its Sites in Weimar, Dessau and Bernau | A grey modernist building with words Bauhaus on the facade | Saxony-Anhalt, Thuringia, Brandenburg | 1996 | 729bis; ii, iv, vi (cultural) | Founded in 1919 in Weimar by Walter Gropius, the Bauhaus was the most influential art school of the 20th century. The buildings designed by the masters of the Bauhaus are key representatives of Classical Modernism. Three buildings in Weimar were listed in 1996, buildings in Dessau and Bernau were added in 2017. The Bauhaus Dessau complex is pictured. |
| Cologne Cathedral | A large cathedral with two bell towers | North Rhine-Westphalia | 1996 | 292bis; i, ii, iv (cultural) | The construction of the Gothic cathedral begun in 1248 and only finished in 1880. Nevertheless, the builders carefully followed the original plan through the centuries of construction. There are numerous artworks in the cathedral, including the Gero Cross from the late 10th century the Shrine of the Three Kings, finished around 1225, which is the largest reliquary shrine in Europe. The site was listed as endangered in 2004 because of plans to construct high-rise buildings nearby. After the development plans were halted, the cathedral was removed from the endangered list in 2006. |
| Luther Memorials in Eisleben and Wittenberg | A beige house with inscription that Melanchthon lived there | Saxony-Anhalt, Thuringia | 1996 | 783; iv, vi (cultural) | This site comprises six buildings associated with Protestant reformers Martin Luther and Philip Melanchthon. In Eisleben, they include the houses where Luther was born in 1483 and died in 1546. In Wittenberg, they include the Melanchthon's house (pictured) and the church where Luther posted his 95 Theses in 1517. Some of the buildings have been embellished in the following centuries. |
| Classical Weimar | A residential palace with a tall clock tower | Thuringia | 1998 | 846; iii, vi (cultural) | Weimar became a cultural center in the late 18th and early 19th centuries under the patronage of Duchess Anna Amalia. Among many artists and writers, the city was home to Goethe and Schiller. During this same period elegant buildings and parks were built. Twelve buildings and ensembles are listed, Schloss Weimar is pictured. |
| Museumsinsel (Museum Island), Berlin | An ornate grey stone building on the point of an urbanized island. The building is connected by two bridges to the neighboring banks | Berlin | 1998 | 896; ii, iv (cultural) | Museum Island comprises five museums built between 1824 and 1930. Each of the museums was designed in line with the collection it was going to host. The collections themselves trace the development of human civilization, with culture, art, and archaeology. The site also illustrates the development of modern museums through time. The Bode Museum is pictured. |
| Wartburg Castle | A castle perched along the edge of a wooded hill. The castle has grown in several stages and consists of sections in dark stone, lighter stone, white plaster and half-timber. | Thuringia | 1999 | 897; ii, iv (cultural) | The castle, situated on a hill above Eisenach, is an outstanding example of a castle from the feudal period, even if only some medieval parts remain and the majority of today's structure dates to the 19th century. During his exile, Martin Luther translated the New Testament into German while staying at the castle. |
| Garden Kingdom of Dessau-Wörlitz | A palace in a Neoclassical style | Saxony-Anhalt | 2000 | 534bis; ii, iv (cultural) | The parks, gardens, and buildings were created for Leopold III, Duke of Anhalt-Dessau in the 18th century and were inspired by the ideas of the Age of Enlightenment. Important buildings include the Schloss Wörlitz (pictured), the first Neoclassical building in Germany, and the Gothic House which inspired the Gothic revival. |
| Monastic Island of Reichenau | A grey and white stone church with two square towers, both capped with red, pyramidal roofs. | Baden-Württemberg | 2000 | 974; iii, iv, vi (cultural) | A Benedictine abbey, the Reichenau Abbey, was founded on the island on the Lake Constance in 724, and traces are preserved today. Between 9th and 11th centuries, three churches were built, during the Carolingian, Ottonian and Salian dynasties when the monastery was an important centre for arts and culture. The ensemble illustrates early monastic architecture in central Europe. The wall paintings in the Church of St. George (pictured) are the only preserved pre-1000 scenic paintings north of the Alps. |
| Zollverein Coal Mine Industrial Complex | A orange metal tower with several flywheels above a building with Zollverein written in golden gothic script letters. | North Rhine-Westphalia | 2001 | 975; ii, iii (cultural) | This site preserves a coal mining complex, representative of an important industry in Europe in the 19th and 20th centuries. In addition to the technical heritage, depicting all stages of coal mining, including the pits, coking plants, railways, residential buildings for miners, and other facilities, the buildings of Shaft 12 are distinguished from an architectural point of view. They were designed by Fritz Schupp and Martin Kemmer in the 1920s in the Bauhaus style and are thus important buildings of the modern architecture. |
| Upper Middle Rhine Valley | A river winds between high cliffs and hills, with a castle in the midground. | Rhineland-Palatinate, Hesse | 2002 | 1066; ii, iv, v (cultural) | The cultural landscape, stretching 65 km (40 mi) along Middle Rhine between Bingen and Koblenz, has been shaped by two millennia of trade interactions between the Mediterranean and the north. There are around 40 hilltop forts and castles along the river, some of which were renovated in the 19th century during the Romanticism movement, when the area served as an inspiration to writers and artists. Katz Castle with the Lorelei rock is pictured. |
| Historic Centres of Stralsund and Wismar | City panorama with a red brick church | Mecklenburg-Western Pomerania | 2002 | 1067; ii, iv (cultural) | The two towns on the Baltic coast were important centres of the Hanseatic League in the 14th and 15th centuries. They came under the Swedish rule after the Thirty Years' War and remained part of Sweden in the 17th and 18th centuries as administrative centres. Stralsund (pictured) has been mainly preserved since the 13th century while Wismar preserved the medieval harbour area. Both towns have numerous buildings in Brick Gothic, as well as defense systems from the Swedish period. |
| Town Hall and Roland on the Marketplace of Bremen | A dark stone gothic building in a paved town square. | Bremen | 2004 | 1087; iii, iv, vi (cultural) | The Town Hall (pictured) and the Roland statue of Bremen symbolize the civic autonomy and market rights in the Holy Roman Empire. The Town Hall was built in the Gothic style in the 15th century, after Bremen became a member of the Hanseatic League. The 1404 Roland statue is a statue of a knight representing knight of Charlemagne, Roland, who symbolizes freedom. |
| Muskauer Park / Park Mużakowski* | Red castle, pond in front | Saxony | 2004 | 1127; i, iv (cultural) | The park is set along the banks of the Neisse River and is shared by Poland and Germany. It was created by Prince Hermann von Puckler-Muskau from 1815 to 1844, using local plants and natural settings. The park design influenced the development of the landscape architecture profession. Sustaining severe damage during World War II, it has been since restored in both countries. |
| Frontiers of the Roman Empire* | A reconstruction of a Roman watchtower | several sites | 2005 | 430ter; ii, iii, iv (cultural) | Limes is a network of fortifications along the border of the Roman Empire. It reached the greatest extent in the second century CE and several parts are still visible today. Hadrian's Wall in the United Kingdom was listed first in 1987. The Upper Germanic-Rhaetian Limes in Germany was added in 2005. This part runs for 550 km (340 mi) between Rheinbrohl on the Rhine and Eining on the Danube. The Antonine Wall, also in the UK, was added in 2005. Two other parts of limes in Germany are listed as separate World Heritage Sites. A reconstruction of a watchtower in Ober-Mörlen is pictured. |
| Old Town of Regensburg with Stadtamhof | City panorama at night with a bridge over a river and a church | Bavaria | 2006 | 1155; ii, iii, iv (cultural) | Built on the site of a Roman town, Regensburg became an important political, religious, and trade centre in the 9th century. It had trade links with Italy, Bohemia, Russia, Byzantium, and even with the Silk Road places. It hosted the Perpetual Assembly of the Holy Roman Empire from 1663 to 1806. The architecture from the 11th to 13th centuries has been well preserved, as well as buildings from different periods, including the Stone Bridge from the 12th century (pictured), the cathedral, numerous churches, monasteries, patrician houses, and fortifications. |
| Berlin Modernism Housing Estates | A long four-storey apartment building in Modernist style | Berlin | 2008 | 1239bis; ii, iv (cultural) | Between 1910 and 1933, especially during the time of the Weimar Republic, Berlin was a progressive and creative city. This was reflected in the construction of several housing estates for low-income citizens in order to improve their living conditions. This site comprises seven such estates that were designed by some of the leading architects of the period, including Bruno Taut, Martin Wagner, and Walter Gropius. The innovative design and housing standards inspired similar projects both in Germany and abroad. The site was extended to include Waldsiedlung Zehlendorf in 2026. The Großsiedlung Siemensstadt is pictured. |
| The Wadden Sea* | Coast with muddy areas and sparse vegetation | Hamburg, Schleswig-Holstein, Lower Saxony | 2009 | 1314; viii, ix, x (natural) | The Wadden Sea is the largest unbroken system of intertidal sand and mud flats in the world. It is an important biodiversity spot, home to species such as harbour seal, grey seal, and harbour porpoise. The sites in Germany and the Netherlands were inscribed to the World Heritage List in 2009 while the property in Denmark was added in 2014. Three sites are listed in Germany: the Lower Saxon Wadden Sea National Park (pictured), Schleswig-Holstein Wadden Sea National Park, and Hamburg Wadden Sea National Park. |
| Ancient and Primeval Beech Forests of the Carpathians and Other Regions of Europe* | Forest scenery with hills and a lake | Brandenburg, Thuringia, Mecklenburg-Vorpommern, Hesse | 2011 | 1133quater; ix (natural) | Primeval Beech Forests of the Carpathians are used to study the spread of the beech tree (Fagus sylvatica) in the Northern Hemisphere across a variety of environments and the environment in the forest. The site was first listed in 2007 in Slovakia and Ukraine. It was extended in 2011, 2017, and 2021 to include forests in a total of 18 countries. In Germany, five forests were added in 2011. Kellerwald is pictured. |
| Prehistoric Pile dwellings around the Alps* | Pile dwelling house, reconstruction | Bavaria, Baden-Württemberg | 2011 | 1363; iv, v (cultural) | This transnational site (shared with Austria, France, Italy, Slovenia, and Switzerland) contains 111 small individual sites with the remains of prehistoric pile-dwelling (or stilt house) settlements in and around the Alps built from around 5000 to 500 BCE on the edges of lakes, rivers, or wetlands. They contain a wealth of information on life and trade in agrarian Neolithic and Bronze Age cultures in Alpine Europe. Eighteen sites are located in Germany. The reconstruction of a house at Pfahlbaumuseum Unteruhldingen on Lake Constance is pictured. |
| Fagus Factory in Alfeld | A factury building in modernist style with a chimney and two flags. Evening photo. | Lower Saxony | 2011 | 1368; i, iv (cultural) | An early modernist building designed by Walter Gropius and constructed in the 1910s, the factory manufacturing shoe lasts was renowned for redefining decorative values of the time period, particularly in the wide use of glass to render the building much more homogeneous. It foreshadowed the later work of Gropius with the Bauhaus. |
| Margravial Opera House Bayreuth | A front view of the opera house in beige stone in Baroque style | Bavaria | 2012 | 1379; i, iv (cultural) | Commissioned by Wilhelmine of Prussia and completed in 1750, the opera house in Bayreuth is an example of a Baroque court theatre. Designed by Giuseppe Galli Bibiena to host 500 spectators, it foreshadowed the construction of large public theaters of the 19th century. |
| Bergpark Wilhelmshöhe | Hercules Monument and the giant cascades. | Hesse | 2013 | 1413; iii, iv (cultural) | The Baroque park near Kassel was commissioned by Charles I, Landgrave of Hesse-Kassel in 1689 and expanded by William I, Elector of Hesse in the 18th century, inspired by Romanticism. The park comprises giant cascades with waterfalls and rapids descending from a hill, ponds, basins, a fountain, an artificial grotto, and a Hercules monument that symbolizes absolute monarchy. |
| Carolingian Westwork and Civitas Corvey | Entrance to the church with two towers | North Rhine-Westphalia | 2014 | 1447; ii, iii, iv (cultural) | The Abbey of Corvey features the only preserved Westwork (pictured), or a monumental west-facing entrance to a church, from the Carolingian era. It was built between 822 and 885. The original interior paintings and stucco figures are the only known example of ancient mythology with Christian interpretation from the period. The Westwork was influential in developing features of the later-eras churches. The abbey itself is preserved as an archaeological site that has been only partially excavated. |
| Speicherstadt and Kontorhaus District with Chilehaus | A large red brick building | Hamburg | 2015 | 1467; iv (cultural) | The Speicherstadt and the adjacent Kontorhaus are two urban areas of Hamburg that developed in the late 19th and early 20th centuries, boosted by the increase in international trade. Along with the related port infrastructure, they constitute one of the largest historical ensembles of warehouses in the world. There are also several early modernist buildings in the complex, the Chilehaus is pictured. The area was partially rebuilt after World War II. |
| The Architectural Work of Le Corbusier, an Outstanding Contribution to the Modern Movement* | A modernist building with columns in one floor and a row of windows one floor higher | Baden-Württemberg | 2016 | 1321rev; i, ii, vi (cultural) | This transnational site (shared with Argentina, Belgium, France, Switzerland, India, and Japan) encompasses 17 works of Franco-Swiss architect Le Corbusier. Le Corbusier was an important representative of the modernist movement, which introduced new architectural techniques to meet the needs of the changing society. The Weissenhof Estate (pictured) in Stuttgart is listed in Germany. |
| Caves and Ice Age Art in the Swabian Jura | A Venus figurine carved from mammoth ivory | Baden-Württemberg | 2017 | 1527; i, iv (cultural) | This site comprises six caves in the Swabian Jura mountains. During the Last Glacial Period, the caves were occupied both by Neanderthals and modern humans at different times. Especially important are the remains from the Aurignacian layers, from 43,000 to 33,000 years ago. Archaeological excavation first started in the 1860s and uncovered numerous carved sculptures of people, animals, musical instruments, and objects of personal adornment. The findings represent some of the earliest examples of figurative art worldwide. The Venus of Hohle Fels is pictured. |
| Naumburg Cathedral | Gothic sculptures of a noble couple, part of cathedral decorations | Saxony-Anhalt | 2018 | 1470rev; i, ii (cultural) | The cathedral has a Romanesque structure with two Gothic choirs, demonstrating the transition between the two styles. The western choir is the work of the Naumburg Master, a sculptor who was active in several places in Europe and created some of the most important and innovative sculptures of the 13th century. The famous feature of the choir is the twelve donor portraits, including the one of Uta von Ballenstedt (pictured, right). |
| Archaeological Border complex of Hedeby and the Danevirke | A group of reconstructed houses in a field | Schleswig-Holstein | 2018 | 1553; iii, iv (cultural) | Hedeby (reconstruction pictured) was an important Viking trading town in the 8th to 11th centuries, owing to its location between the Frankish and the Danish kingdoms. Archaeological finds have provided insight into the life and culture of the Europe during the Viking Age. Danevirke is a series of fortification from the same period, separating the Jutland peninsula from the mainland Europe. |
| Erzgebirge/Krušnohoří Mining Region* | Mining infrastructure with a red mining tower | Saxony | 2019 | 1478; ii, iii, iv (cultural) | The Ore Mountains span over south-eastern Germany and north-western Czech Republic. The region has been an important source of metals since the 12th century, including silver (especially in the 15th and 16th centuries), tin, cobalt, and also uranium in the late 19th and 20th centuries. The cultural landscape of the region was shaped by mining and smelting innovations. The mining infrastructure in Altenberg is pictured. |
| Water Management System of Augsburg | A white power plant with numerous windows with water flowing below the building | Bavaria | 2019 | 1580; ii, iv (cultural) | With the first water management works from the 14th century, Augsburg introduced strict separation of drinking and process water already in 1545. The site comprises canals and water towers from the 15th to 17th centuries, fountains, as well as hydroelectric power plants from the industrial era in the 19th century (Meitingen plant pictured). Augsburg was also the place where several water management innovations were tested for the first time. |
| The Great Spa Towns of Europe* | A casino building in Neoclassical style at a river | Bavaria, Baden-Württemberg, Rhineland-Palatinate | 2021 | 1613; ii, iii, iv, vi (cultural) | The Great Spa Towns of Europe comprises 11 spa towns in seven European countries where mineral waters were used for healing and therapeutic purposes before the development of industrial medication in the 19th century. The towns of Baden-Baden, Bad Ems (pictured), and Bad Kissingen are listed in Germany. |
| Frontiers of the Roman Empire – The Danube Limes (Western Segment)* | | several sites | 2021 | 1608rev; ii, iii, iv (cultural) | The Danubian Limes, a network of fortifications along the Danube river, protected the borders of the Roman Empire. The site is shared with Austria and Slovakia. There are 77 individual properties listed, such as roads, camps, and fortresses, 24 of which are in Germany. |
| Mathildenhöhe Darmstadt | A tower in red brick and an exhibition building | Hesse | 2021 | 1614; ii, iv (cultural) | The artists colony at Mathildenhöhe above Darmstadt was founded at the end of the 19th century by Ernest Louis, Grand Duke of Hesse. It hosted four international exhibitions, the last one in 1914. The buildings of the colony (the Wedding Tower from 1908 and one of the exhibition halls pictured) were designed by resident artists who were inspired by the Arts and Crafts movement and the Vienna Secession. |
| Frontiers of the Roman Empire – The Lower German Limes* | | several sites | 2021 | 1631; ii, iii, iv (cultural) | The Lower German Limes protected the Roman province of Germania Inferior (Lower Germany), along the Rhine from the Rhenish Massif to the North Sea coast. The fortifications were established in the late 1st century BCE and remained in use until the disintegration of the Western Roman Empire in the early 5th century CE. The site comprises 102 sites, 39 of which are in the Netherlands, the others are in Germany. Sites include remains of forts, towns, roads, and other infrastructure. |
| ShUM Sites of Speyer, Worms and Mainz | Ruins of a brick building | Rhineland-Palatinate | 2021 | 1636; ii, iii, vi (cultural) | The ShUM communities, named after the initial letters of Hebrew city names Speyer, Worms, and Mainz, were crucial in the development of the Ashkenazi culture in central Europe, especially between the 10th and 13th centuries. The sites, which comprise the Jewish Cemetery in Worms, Worms Synagogue, Jewish courtyard in Speyer (pictured), and the Old Jewish Cemetery in Mainz, were influential in the architecture of Jewish communities in Germany, northern France, and England. |
| Jewish-Medieval Heritage of Erfurt | An old stone building with a wooden roof | Thuringia | 2023 | 1656; iv (cultural) | This site comprises three buildings related to the Medieval Jewish community of Erfurt. The Old Synagogue (pictured) was first built in the late 11th century and twice rebuilt, the large and prestigious building from around 1270 incorporated some parts of the previous structures. Following a pogrom in 1349, the building was used for other purposes until the late 20th century when its original function was rediscovered and renovations took place. The remains of a mikveh, a Jewish ritual bath from around 1250, were discovered in 2007. The third building is the secular Stone House from mid-13th century. |
| Moravian Church Settlements* | Street in a town, a church building at the end | Saxony | 2024 | 1468, iii, iv (cultural) | The settlements of the Moravian Church, a Protestant denomination, from the second half of the 18th century are planned cities, reflecting the egalitarian philosophy of the community. They share similar urban layouts, including open and green spaces, a congregational building, cemetery, sanctuary, and houses for communal living, separated by age, gender, and marital status. Christiansfeld in Denmark has been listed as a World Heritage Site in 2015. In 2024 the site was extended to include the Historic Moravian Bethlehem District in the United States, Herrnhut (pictured) in Germany, and Gracehill in the United Kingdom. |
| Residence Ensemble Schwerin – Cultural Landscape of Romantic Historicism | A castle in a middle of a lake | Mecklenburg-Vorpommern | 2024 | 1705, iv (cultural) | The castle, located on an island in Lake Schwerin, was first documented as a Slavic fort in the 10th century and rebuilt several times. It got its present look in the mid-19th century when it was extensively remodeled in line with the ideas of Romantic historicism. The cultural landscape also comprises parks, gardens, and various buildings that illustrate the last flourishing of court culture in the 19th century. |
| The Palaces of King Ludwig II of Bavaria: Neuschwanstein, Linderhof, Schachen and Herrenchiemsee | Neuschwanstein castle, a fairy-tale style castle with many towers on the top of a hill | Bavaria | 2025 | 1726; iv (cultural) | This site comprises three ensembles and a small villa commissioned by Ludwig II of Bavaria in the second half of the 19th century. Nicknamed the "fairy-tale king", the politically powerless Ludwig II wanted to recreate places from far away or from distant past. The Neuschwanstein castle (pictured) was inspired by the operas of Richard Wagner, the Herrenchiemsee by Versailles, and the Linderhof Palace both by Oriental buildings and by the world of Wagner. All three complexes were soon turned into museums, allowing for their near-complete preservation. |

== Tentative list ==
In addition to sites inscribed on the World Heritage List, member states can maintain a list of tentative sites that they may consider for nomination. Nominations for the World Heritage List are only accepted if the site was previously listed on the tentative list. Germany maintains eleven properties on its tentative list.

Tentative sites
| Site | Image | Location (state) | Year listed | UNESCO criteria | Description |
|---|---|---|---|---|---|
| Francke Foundation Buildings | A large four storey building with red roof | Saxony-Anhalt | 1999 | iii, iv, vi (cultural) | This site comprises the buildings of a multidisciplinary foundation established in 1698 in Halle by theologian and educator August Hermann Francke, inspired by the Pietism movement. They include a school, residential buildings, a library, a hospital, and several halls. The old orphanage is pictured. Francke's ideas were also influential in Russia, southern Italy, and North America. |
| The Jewish Cemetery of Altona Königstraße. Sephardic Sepulchral Culture of the 17th and 18th century between Europe and the Caribbean | Several tombstones with Hebrew inscriptions | Hamburg | 2015 | iii, iv, vi (cultural) | The Jewish cemetery in Hamburg dates to the early 17th century. It has a section that was used by the local Ashkenazi community and one used by the Sephardic Jews who emigrated from Portugal to northern Europe. The latter were for generations prevented from practicing their traditions so they developed a distinct sepulchral art and culture, different than that in the Iberian Peninsula and also different from that of the Jews who migrated to other areas. Some 1,600 tombstones have been preserved. Some tombstones carved in Hamburg were sent to communities in other countries, even to the Caribbean. |
| Alpine and pre-alpine meadow and marsh landscapes (historic anthropogenic landscapes in the area of "Werdenfelser Land", "Ammergau", "Staffelseegebiet" and "Murnauer Moos", district Garmisch-Partenkirchen) | Alpine scenery with a meadow and forest | Bavaria | 2015 | v (cultural) | This nomination comprises four areas with Alpine and pre-alpine meadows around Garmisch-Partenkirchen that have been managed since at least the Middle Ages. The cultural landscape contains barns, huts, and cattle and sheep enclosures. The area is also rich in biodiversity. Murnauer Moos is pictured. |
| Luther memorials in Saxony-Anhalt, Saxony, Bavaria and Thuringia | A look at a monastery from above | Bavaria, Saxony-Anhalt, Saxony, Thuringia | 2015 | iv, vi (cultural) | This is a proposed expansion of the Luther memorials site in Eisleben and Wittenberg, originally listed in 1996. It lists additional twelve sites connected to Martin Luther and the Reformation in Mansfeld, Torgau, Coburg, and Erfurt. St. Augustine's Monastery in Erfurt is pictured. |
| Torgau Castle Chapel | A building with white walls and a red roof | Saxony | 2024 | ii, iv, vi (cultural) | This chapel located in Hartenfels Castle, Torgau, represents the transition from the traditional medieval castle chapels to early modern designs influenced by the Reformation. As it is the only church built according Martin Luther's considerations, the chapel's interior reflects Lutheran ideas. |
| Green Belt | A line of greenery cutting through numerous fields | Bavaria, Brandenburg, Hesse, Lower Saxony, Mecklenburg-Western Pomerania, Saxony, Saxony-Anhalt, Schleswig-Holstein, Thuringia | 2024 | ix, x (natural) | The Green Belt is a continuous stretch of green land along the former Iron Curtain. This 1,393 km long area connects multiple natural areas in Germany, thus being a successful example of battling fragmentation of habitats. In addition, many endangered species have settled in the area. |
| Olympic Park Munich | A view of a giant sports complex from above | Bavaria | 2024 | i, ii, iv (cultural) | This park was built for the 1972 Summer Olympics and now continues its function as a sports center. It successfully combines landscape with architecture and sports facilities. The Olympic Roof is innovative in its design and construction. |
| Pretzien Weir | A low dam | Saxony-Anhalt | 2024 | ii, iv (cultural) | This weir was built in 1875 on the Elbe to protect Magdeburg from periodic flooding. This dam is considered to be the first large-scale attempt to control river floods and represents 19th-century advances in engineering. |
| Site of the Schöningen Spears – Humans and hunting 300,000 years ago | An archaeological site undergoing excavation | Saxony-Anhalt | 2024 | ii, iv (cultural) | Exceptionally preserved wooden spears and animal bones dating to the Pleistocene were found in this site in 1992. These spears are the oldest known hunting weapons and reflect the technological development, behavior, and lifeways of the hunter-gatherers. |
| The Television Tower Stuttgart. Archetype and symbol of modern mass communication | A white television tower | Baden-Württemberg | 2024 | ii, iv (cultural) | It is the first telecommunications tower in the world, thus acting as a prototype for similar structures that have become common worldwide with the spread of television in the 20th century. This tower is also a significant engineering achievement, as it involved new methods of construction to withstand strong wind. |
| European Paper Mills (from the era of hand-made paper)* | | Bavaria, Saxony | 2024 | ii, iii, iv (cultural) | This transnational nomination comprises six 16th–18th century paper mills that show the importance of Europe in paper production. The Homburg Paper Mill and Niederzwönitz Paper Mill (pictured) are nominated in Germany. |
| Celtic centres of power of the Early Iron Age north of the Alps | Aerial view of a hillfort | Baden-Württemberg, Hesse | 2026 | ii, iii (cultural) | This nomination comprises two early Celtic archaeological sites belonging to 7th–4th centuries BCE: Heuneburg (pictured) and Glauberg. |

== Former site ==
World Heritage Sites
| Site | Image | Location (state) | Year listed | UNESCO data | Description |
|---|---|---|---|---|---|
| Dresden Elbe Valley | Several Baroque buildings in Dresden old town, reflected in the River Elbe | Saxony | 2004 | 1156; ii, iii, iv, v (cultural) | The cultural landscape of the Elbe river around Dresden has numerous monuments and parks from the 16th to 20th centuries, as well as suburban villas and gardens from the 19th and 20th centuries. Following the plans to construct the Waldschlösschen Bridge over the river, the site was placed on the List of World Heritage in Danger in 2006. As the construction of the bridge continued and caused irreversible damage to the landscape, the site was delisted in 2009. |

== See also ==
- List of Intangible Cultural Heritage elements in Germany
- Tourism in Germany
- List of national parks in Germany
- Kulturdenkmal, the term used in German-speaking countries to describe cultural heritage
- Deutsche Stiftung Denkmalschutz, a foundation focused on cultural heritage in Germany
