= Melanchthonhaus (Wittenberg) =

Museum

UNESCO World Heritage Site
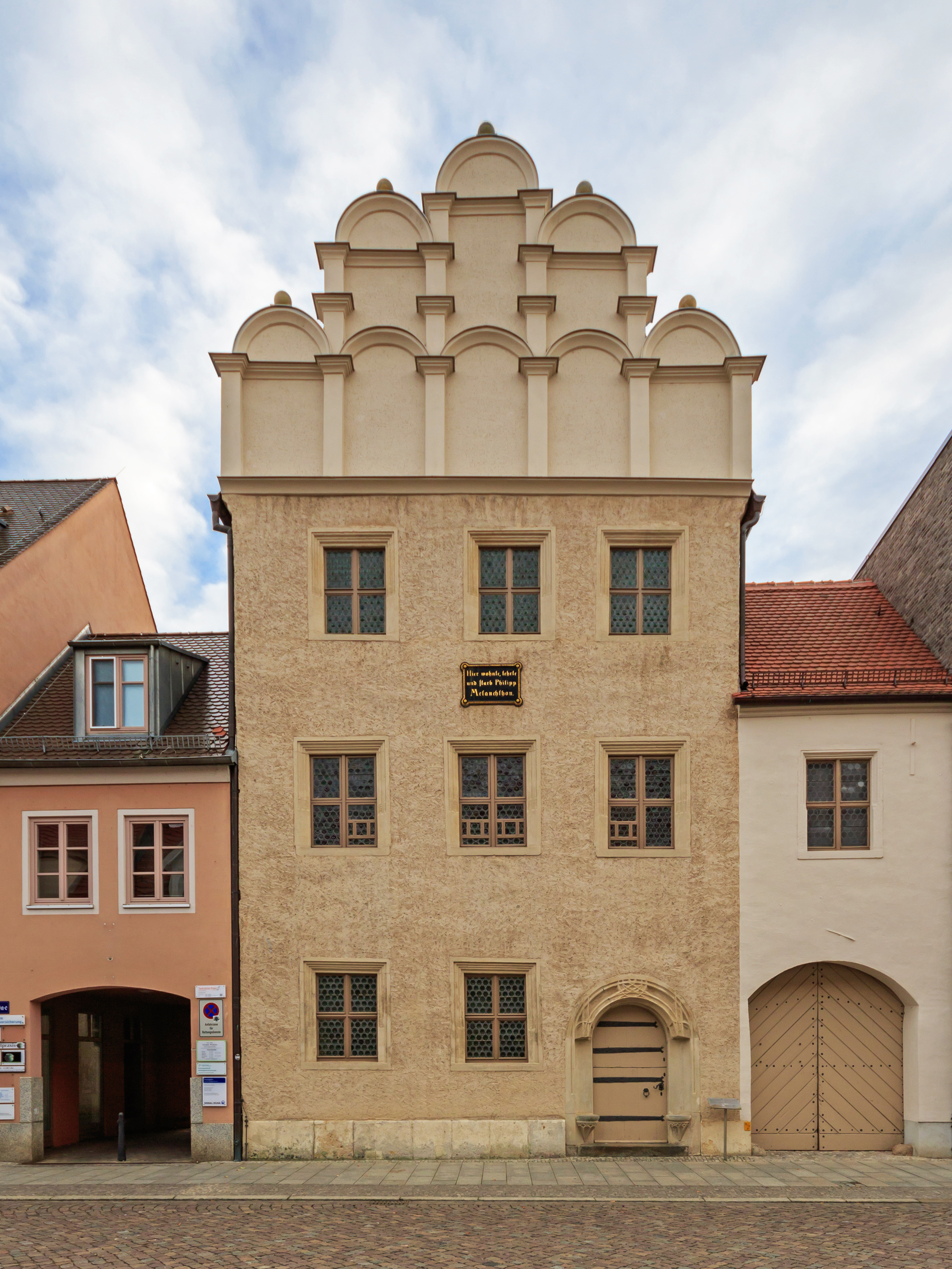
- The Melanchthonhaus

- Location within Germany Location within Saxony-Anhalt
- Official name: Melanchthonhaus
- Location: Wittenberg, Sachsen-Anhalt, Germany
- Part of: Luther Memorials in Eisleben and Wittenberg
- Criteria: Cultural: (iv)(vi)
- Reference: 783-001
- Inscription: 1996 (20th Session)
- Area: 0.12 ha (0.30 acres)
- Coordinates: 51°51′53″N 12°39′03″E

The Melanchthonhaus is a writer's house museum in the German town of Lutherstadt Wittenberg. It is a Renaissance building with late Gothic arched windows and the broad-tiered gables. It includes the study of the influential Protestant Reformer Philipp Melanchthon, who lived there with his family. In 1954 the house became a museum on Melanchthon's life and work displaying paintings, prints and manuscripts by him and his contemporaries. In 1996, the building became a UNESCO World Heritage Site along with sites associated with Melanchthon's contemporary Martin Luther in Witternberg and Eisleben because of their religious significance and the lasting, global influence of Protestantism.
