= Jewish-Medieval Heritage of Erfurt =

Medieval Jewish buildings in Erfurt, Germany

The Jewish-Medieval Heritage of Erfurt is a series of buildings in the Old Town part of Erfurt, Germany, recognized as an item of Jewish cultural heritage. It was inscribed into the UNESCO List of World Heritage Sites in Germany in 2023. It includes Erfurt's Old Synagogue, the oldest synagogue in Europe; the Erfurt Mikveh, a mikveh that was only rediscovered in 2007; and the Stone House, a 13th century residential building in Jewish ownership until present times.

== Gallery ==
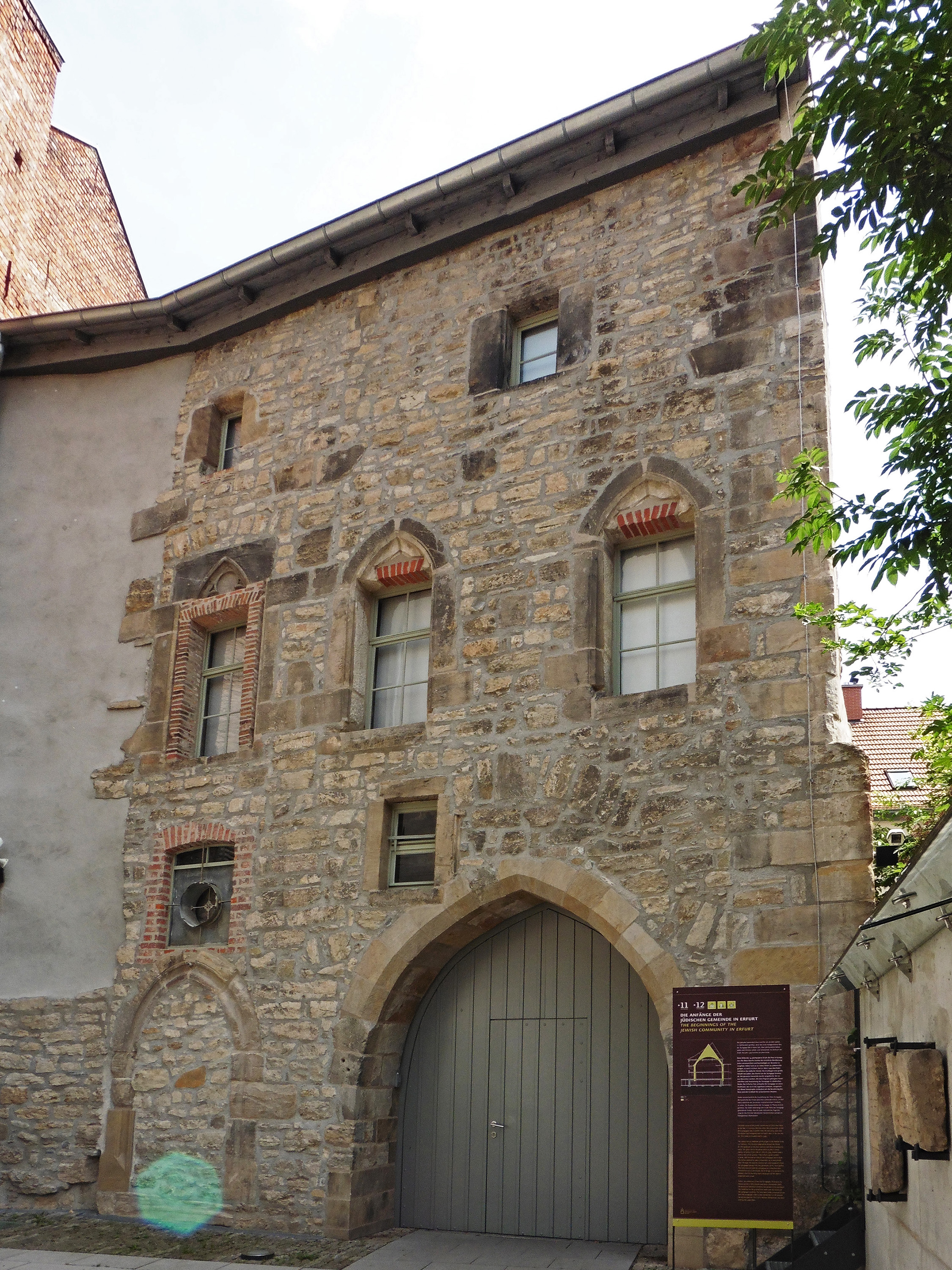
Old Synagogue

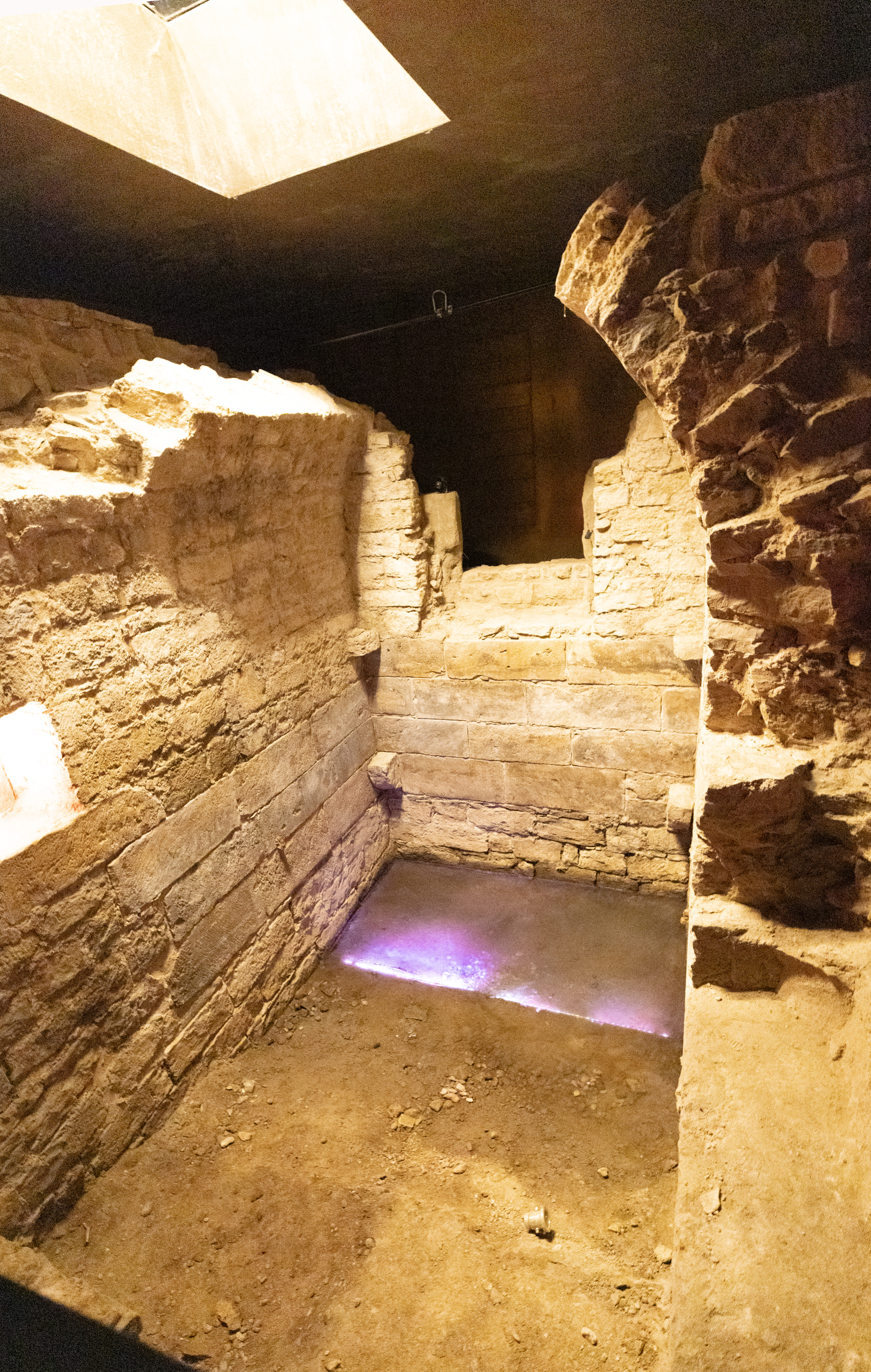
The mikveh

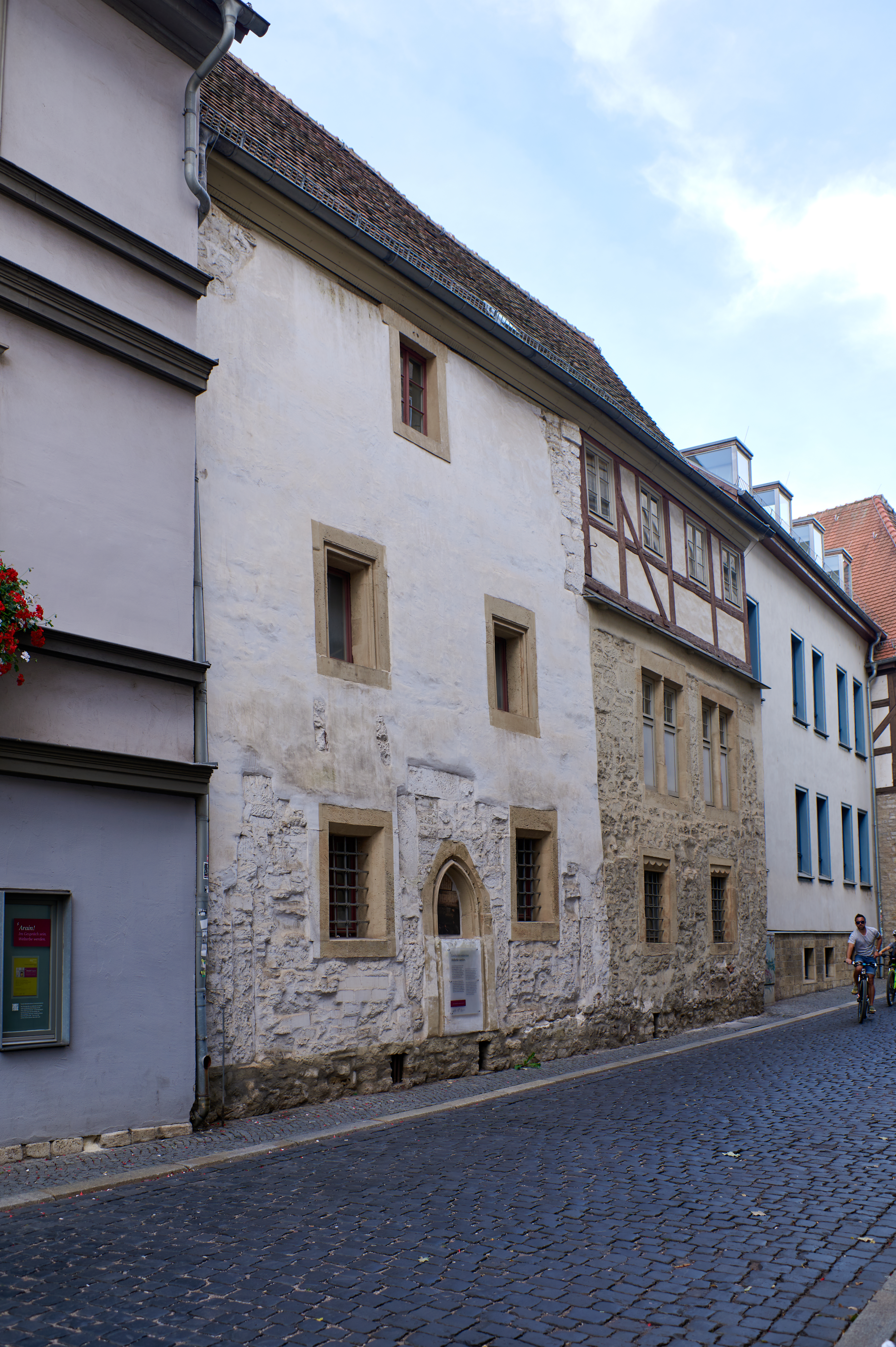
Stone House
