= Allstedt-Kaltenborn =

Coordinates: 51°24′N 11°23′E

Allstedt-Kaltenborn was a Verwaltungsgemeinschaft ("collective municipality") in the Mansfeld-Südharz district, in Saxony-Anhalt, Germany. It was situated east of Sangerhausen. The seat of the Verwaltungsgemeinschaft was in Allstedt.

It was disbanded on 1 January 2010.

The Verwaltungsgemeinschaft Allstedt-Kaltenborn consisted of the following municipalities:

1. Allstedt
2. Beyernaumburg
3. Emseloh
4. Holdenstedt
5. Katharinenrieth
6. Liedersdorf
7. Mittelhausen
8. Niederröblingen
9. Nienstedt
10. Pölsfeld
11. Sotterhausen
12. Winkel
13. Wolferstedt
