= South Harz Karst Landscape Biosphere Reserve =

Biosphere reserve in Germany

Coordinates: 51°30′N 11°10′E

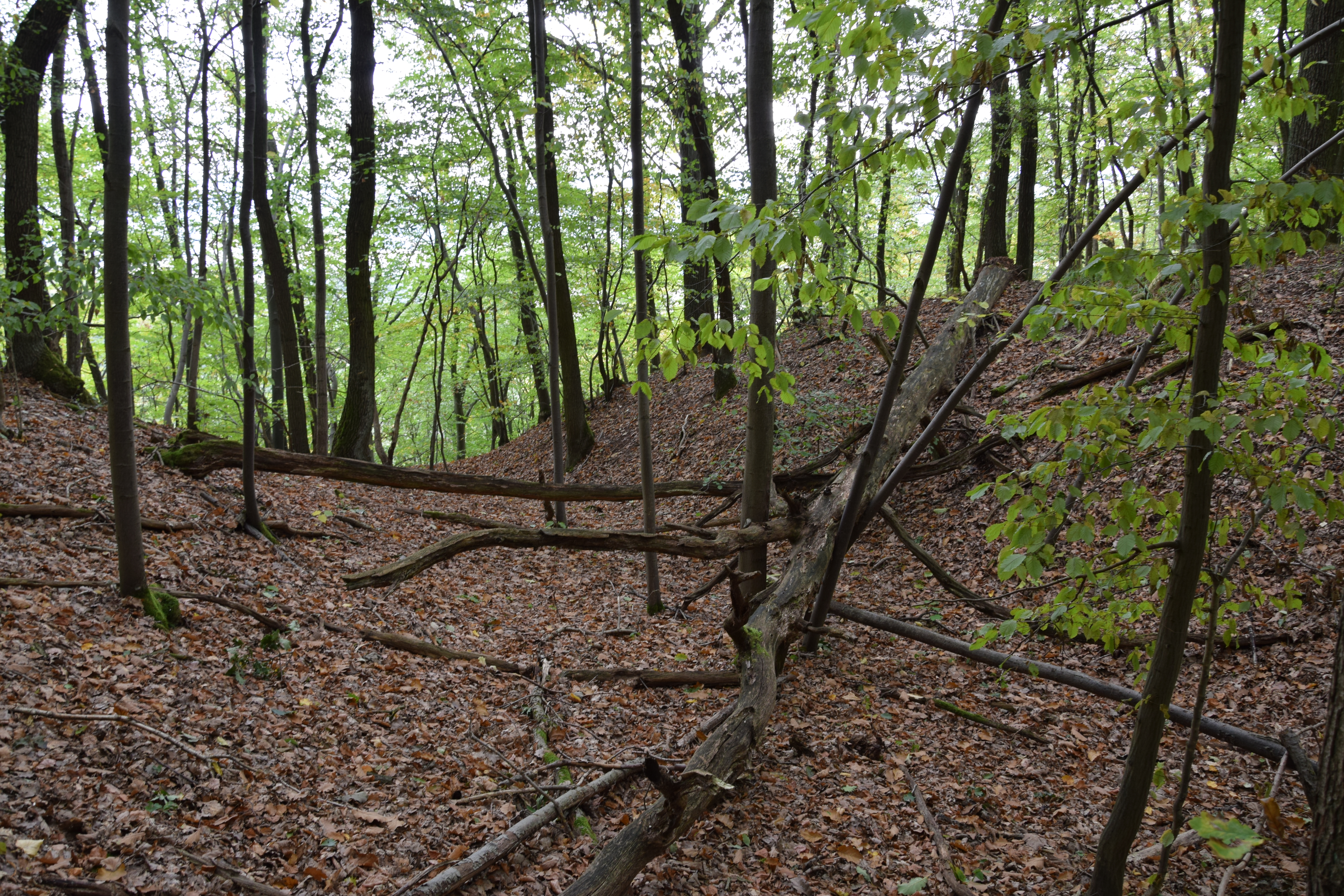
Alter Stolberg - Karstwanderweg Graben

The South Harz Karst Landscape Biosphere Reserve (German: Biosphärenreservat Karstlandschaft Südharz) is a biosphere reserve in the German state of Saxony-Anhalt. It was founded on 23 March 2009 and is thus the 16th biosphere reserve in Germany. Its recognition by UNESCO is pending.

== Geography ==
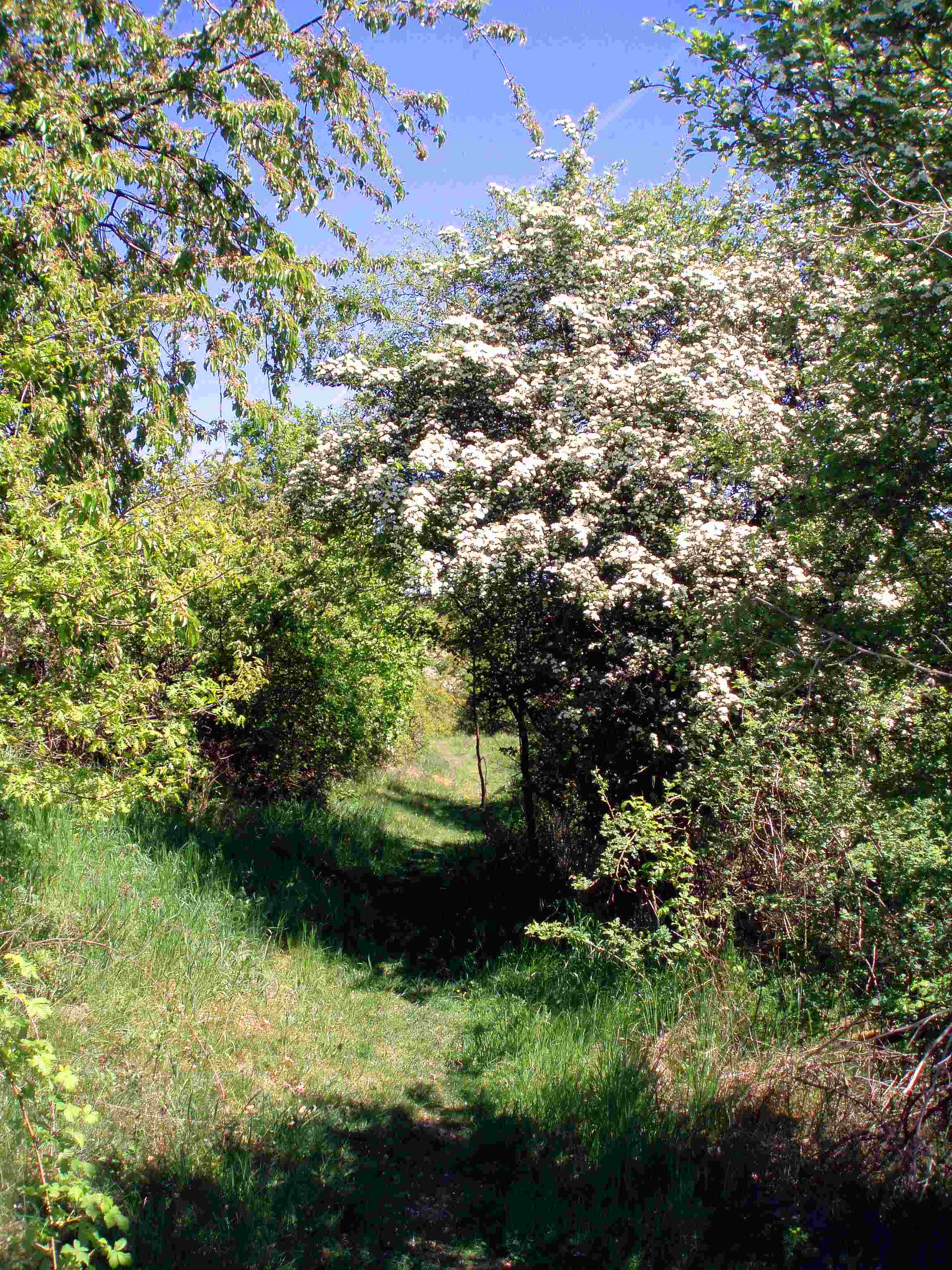
On the Karst Trail near Questenberg, Südharz municipality

The biosphere reserve has an area of 30,034 hectares and lies in the county of Mansfeld-Südharz on the territory of the towns of Allstedt and Sangerhausen and the municipalities of Berga, Südharz and Wallhausen. It runs from the southern edge of the Harz Mountains from the state border with Lower Saxony to the southern foothills of the Mansfeld Uplands in Pölsfeld.

The gypsum karst landscape with its Zechstein deposits features caves, sink-holes, dolines, ponors and karst springs. As well as beech woods, there is a roughly 1000-year-old cultural landscape on the steep southern slopes of the South Harz with wood pastures, calcareous grassland and meadows with scattered fruit trees (Streuobstwiesen). Near Sangerhausen there is a former mining landscape with galleries and tips. Climatically the biosphere reserve lies on the transition between the sub-atlantic and sub-continental zones.

== Protected zones ==
The biosphere reserve is divided into a core zone (Kernzone) and a managed zone (Pflegezone), which include six nature reserves

- Alter Stolberg (Saxony-Anhalt) and Grasburger Wiesen
- Heimkehle Gypsum Karst Landscape (Gipskarstlandschaft Heimkehle)
- Pölsfeld Gypsum Karst Landscape (Gipskarstlandschaft Pölsfeld)
- QuestenbergGypsum Karst Landscape (Gipskarstlandschaft Questenberg)
- Großer Ronneberg-Bielstein
- Pferdekopf

as well as six Natura 2000 areas. Whilst, in the core zone, human intervention is banned, in the managed zone, some land usage is possible, as long as it conforms to the nature reserve regulations and does not affect the conservation and care of the eco-system.

The "development zone" covers the rest of the area of the biosphere reserve, including parts of the protected landscape of "Harz and Southern Harz Foreland". Here, human management, including its use as a recreational area and the needs of nature, are considered together.

== Tourism ==
The Karst Trail runs through the eastern part of the biosphere reserve. In November 2010, over 20 nature and landscape guides were trained. This community project by the biosphere reserve's authorities and the county college of further education was enabled local nature lovers to be qualified to look after tourists.

== Goat grazing ==
At two places in the biosphere reserve, (Bösenrode and Wallhausen) sheep and Boer goats have been introduced into orchards. This is intended to prevent the land becoming overgrown with bushes.

== See also ==
- South Harz Zechstein Belt
