= Friedrich Adolf, Count von Kalckreuth =

German general

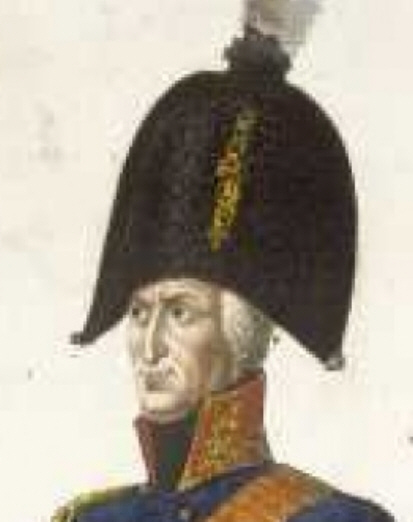
Friedrich Adolf, Count von Kalckreuth.

Friedrich Adolf Graf von Kalckreuth (22 February 1737 – 10 June 1818) was a Prussian Generalfeldmarschall.

Kalkreuth was born in Sotterhausen near Sangerhausen. He entered the regiment of Gardes du Corps in 1752, and in 1758 was adjutant or aide de camp to Frederick the Great's brother, Prince Henry, with whom he served throughout the later stages of the Seven Years' War. He won special distinction at the battle of Freiberg (29 September 1762), for which Frederick promoted him major.

Personal differences with Prince Henry severed their connection in 1766, and for many years Kalckreuth lived in comparative retirement. He participated in the War of the Bavarian Succession as a colonel, and on the accession of Frederick William II was restored to favour. He greatly distinguished himself as a major-general in the invasion of the Netherlands in 1787, and by 1792 had become count and lieutenant-general. Under the Duke of Brunswick, he took a conspicuous part in the campaign of Valmy in 1792, the siege of Mainz in 1793, and the Battle of Kaiserslautern in 1794.

Kalckreuth was defeated in the 1806 Battle of Auerstedt. In 1807 he defended Danzig for 78 days against the French under Marshal Lefebvre, with far greater skill and energy than he had shown in the previous year. He was promoted to field marshal soon afterwards, and conducted many of the negotiations at Tilsit. He died as governor of Berlin in 1818.

The Dictées du Feldmaréchal Kalckreuth were published by his son (Paris, 1844).
