= Grillenburg =

Grillenburg may refer to:

- Grillenburg (Tharandt), a village in the municipality of Hartha in the borough of Tharandt, Sächsische Schweiz-Osterzgebirge district, Saxony
- Grillenburg Hunting Lodge in the Tharandt Forest, Sächsische Schweiz-Osterzgebirge district, Saxony
- Grillenburg Triangle, the motorcycle track of the 1st Sachsenring, in the Tharandt Forest, Sächsische Schweiz-Osterzgebirge district, Saxony
- Grillenburg Sandstone, the Elbe sandstone type in the Tharandt Forest, Sächsische Schweiz-Osterzgebirge district, Saxony
- Grillenburg (Harz), a ruined castle above Grillenberg in the Harz Mountains, Mansfeld-Südharz district, Saxony-Anhalt
