= Grillenberg =

Grillenberg may refer to the following villages:

- Grillenberg (Albeck), village in the municipality of Albeck, county of Feldkirchen, Carinthia, Austria
- Grillenberg (Deggendorf), village in the borough of Deggendorf, county of Deggendorf, Bavaria, Germany
- Grillenberg (Hernstein), cadastral municipality of Hernstein, county of Baden, Lower Austria
- Grillenberg (Sangerhausen), village in the borough of Sangerhausen, county of Mansfeld-Südharz, Saxony-Anhalt, Germany
- Grillenberg (Simbach), village in the municipality of Simbach, county of Dingolfing-Landau, Bavaria, Germany
- Grillenberg (Thyrnau), village in the municipality of Thyrnau, county of Passau, Bavaria, Germany
