= Johann Karl Wilhelm Voigt =

German geologist

Johann Karl Wilhelm Voigt (20 February 1752 in Allstedt – 2 January 1821 in Ilmenau) was a German mineralogist and mining engineer.

He initially studied law at the University of Jena, then in 1776 enrolled at the Mining Academy in Freiberg as a pupil of Abraham Gottlob Werner. He later relocated to Weimar, where in 1783 he was named secretary of the Bergwerkskommission (mining commission). During his time spent in Weimar he developed a close friendship with Johann Wolfgang von Goethe — through Voigt, Goethe received an education in mineralogy. From 1789 to 1821, he served as Bergrath (councillor of mines) in Ilmenau.

He is best remembered for his dispute with Werner in regards to latter's theory of Neptunism; with Voigt maintaining that basalt was of volcanic origin. In 1800 he introduced the term "lettenkohle" to describe coal with a large content of letten (regional German word for clay and mud).

The thoroughfare Bergrat-Voigt-Straße in Erfurt commemorates his name.

== Selected works ==
- Mineralogische Reisen durch das Herzogthum Weimar und Eisenach und einige angränzende Gegenden, 1785 – Mineralogical trips through the duchy of Weimar and Eisenach and some neighboring areas.
- Mineralogische Reise von Weimar über den Thüringer Wald, Meiningen, die Rhönberge, bis Bieber und Hanau, 1786 – Mineralogical trip from Weimar of the Thuringian Forest, Meiningen, the Rhön Mountains, up until Bieber and Hanau.
- Mineralogische beschreibung des hochstifts Fuld und einiger merkwürdigen gegenden am Rhein und Mayn, 1794 – Mineralogical description of Hochstift Fulda and some unique locations on the Rhine and Mayn.
- Practische gebirgskunde, 1797 – Practical mountain studies.
- Kleine mineralogische schriften (2 volumes, 1799–1800) – Smaller mineralogical writings.
- Versuch einer Geschichte der Steinkohlen, der Braunkohlen und des Torfes, etc. (2 volumes, 1802–05) – Essay on the history of coal, lignite and peat.
- Geschichte des Ilmenauischen Bergbaues nebst einer geognostischen Darstellung der dasigen Gegend, 1821 – History of mining at Ilmenau together with a representation of the geognostic area.
