= Holdenstedt =

- Ortschaft of Allstedt
- Interactive map of Holdenstedt
- Location within Germany Location within Saxony-Anhalt
- Coordinates: 51°29′N 11°27′E
- Country: Germany
- State: Saxony-Anhalt
- District: Mansfeld-Südharz
- Town: Allstedt

Area
  - Total: 9.74 km^{2} (3.76 sq mi)
- Elevation: 203 m (666 ft)

Population (2013)
  - Total: 666
  - Density: 68.4/km^{2} (177/sq mi)
- Time zone: UTC+01:00 (CET)
  - Summer (DST): UTC+02:00 (CEST)
- Postal codes: 06528
- Dialling codes: 034659

Holdenstedt is a village and a former municipality in the Mansfeld-Südharz district, Saxony-Anhalt, Germany. Since 1 January 2010, it is part of the town Allstedt, of which it forms an Ortschaft.
