= Sotterhausen =

- Ortschaft of Allstedt
- Interactive map of Sotterhausen
- Location within Germany Location within Saxony-Anhalt
- Coordinates: 51°27′N 11°24′E
- Country: Germany
- State: Saxony-Anhalt
- District: Mansfeld-Südharz
- Town: Allstedt

Area
  - Total: 5.75 km^{2} (2.22 sq mi)
- Elevation: 190 m (620 ft)

Population (2013)
  - Total: 241
  - Density: 41.9/km^{2} (109/sq mi)
- Time zone: UTC+01:00 (CET)
  - Summer (DST): UTC+02:00 (CEST)
- Postal codes: 06528
- Dialling codes: 03464

Sotterhausen is a village and a former municipality in the Mansfeld-Südharz district, Saxony-Anhalt, Germany. Since 1 January 2010, it is part of the town Allstedt, of which it forms an Ortschaft.

== People from Sotterhausen ==
- Friedrich Adolf, Count von Kalckreuth (1737-1818), Prussian field marshal
