= Winkel, Saxony-Anhalt =

Winkel
- Ortschaft of Allstedt
- Interactive map of Winkel
- Location within Germany Location within Saxony-Anhalt
- Coordinates: 51°24′N 11°28′E
- Country: Germany
- State: Saxony-Anhalt
- District: Mansfeld-Südharz
- Town: Allstedt

Area
  - Total: 12.70 km^{2} (4.90 sq mi)
- Elevation: 267 m (876 ft)

Population (2013)
  - Total: 316
  - Density: 24.9/km^{2} (64.4/sq mi)
- Time zone: UTC+01:00 (CET)
  - Summer (DST): UTC+02:00 (CEST)
- Dialling codes: 034652

Winkel (German pronunciation: [ˈvɪŋkl̩]) is a village and a former municipality in the Mansfeld-Südharz district, Saxony-Anhalt, Germany. Since 1 September 2010, it is part of the town Allstedt, of which it forms an Ortschaft.
