= Sermon to the Princes =

16th-century Christian sermon

The Sermon to the Princes is a Christian sermon apparently delivered by Thomas Müntzer on 13 July 1524, allegedly given to Duke John of Saxony and his advisors in Allstedt, though the circumstances surrounding this event are unclear.

The sermon focuses on Daniel 2, a chapter in which Daniel, hostage in Babylon, becomes an adviser to the king because of his ability to interpret dreams. In the sermon, Müntzer presents himself as a new Daniel to interpret the dreams of the princes to them. He interpreted Daniel 2:44 as speaking of the kingdom of God that would consume all earthly kingdoms.
