= Liedersdorf =

- Ortschaft of Allstedt
- Interactive map of Liedersdorf
- Location within Germany Location within Saxony-Anhalt
- Coordinates: 51°28′N 11°26′E
- Country: Germany
- State: Saxony-Anhalt
- District: Mansfeld-Südharz
- Town: Allstedt

Area
  - Total: 2.79 km^{2} (1.08 sq mi)
- Elevation: 181 m (594 ft)

Population (2013)
  - Total: 273
  - Density: 97.8/km^{2} (253/sq mi)
- Time zone: UTC+01:00 (CET)
  - Summer (DST): UTC+02:00 (CEST)
- Postal codes: 06528
- Dialling codes: 034659

Liedersdorf is a village and a former municipality in the Mansfeld-Südharz district, Saxony-Anhalt, Germany. Since 1 January 2010, it is part of the town Allstedt, of which it forms an Ortschaft.
