= Rotha =

- Part of Sangerhausen
- Interactive map of Rotha
- Location within Germany Location within Saxony-Anhalt
- Coordinates: 51°32′31″N 11°08′48″E
- Country: Germany
- State: Saxony-Anhalt
- District: Mansfeld-Südharz
- Municipality: Sangerhausen

Area
  - Total: 9.5 km^{2} (3.7 sq mi)
- Elevation: 400 m (1,300 ft)

Population (31 December 2022)
  - Total: 261
  - Density: 27/km^{2} (71/sq mi)
- Time zone: UTC+01:00 (CET)
  - Summer (DST): UTC+02:00 (CEST)

Rotha is a village in the municipality of Sangerhausen, in the Mansfeld-Südharz district of Saxony-Anhalt, Germany.

== Geography ==
Rotha lies in the northeastern part of the municipal area of Sangerhausen, approximately 18 kilometres from the town centre, at an elevation of around 400 metres above sea level. The village is surrounded by agricultural land, with a larger forested area to the east.

The Landstraße 232 runs through Rotha, connecting it with neighbouring localities including Horla, Morungen and Wettelrode, and providing access towards the higher elevations of the Harz region.

== History ==
Rotha was first documented in 1347 under the name “Rote” in a boundary description of the Lordship of Questenberg.

Since 1950, Rotha has included the nearby settlement of Paßbruch, located approximately two kilometres from the village.

== Gallery ==
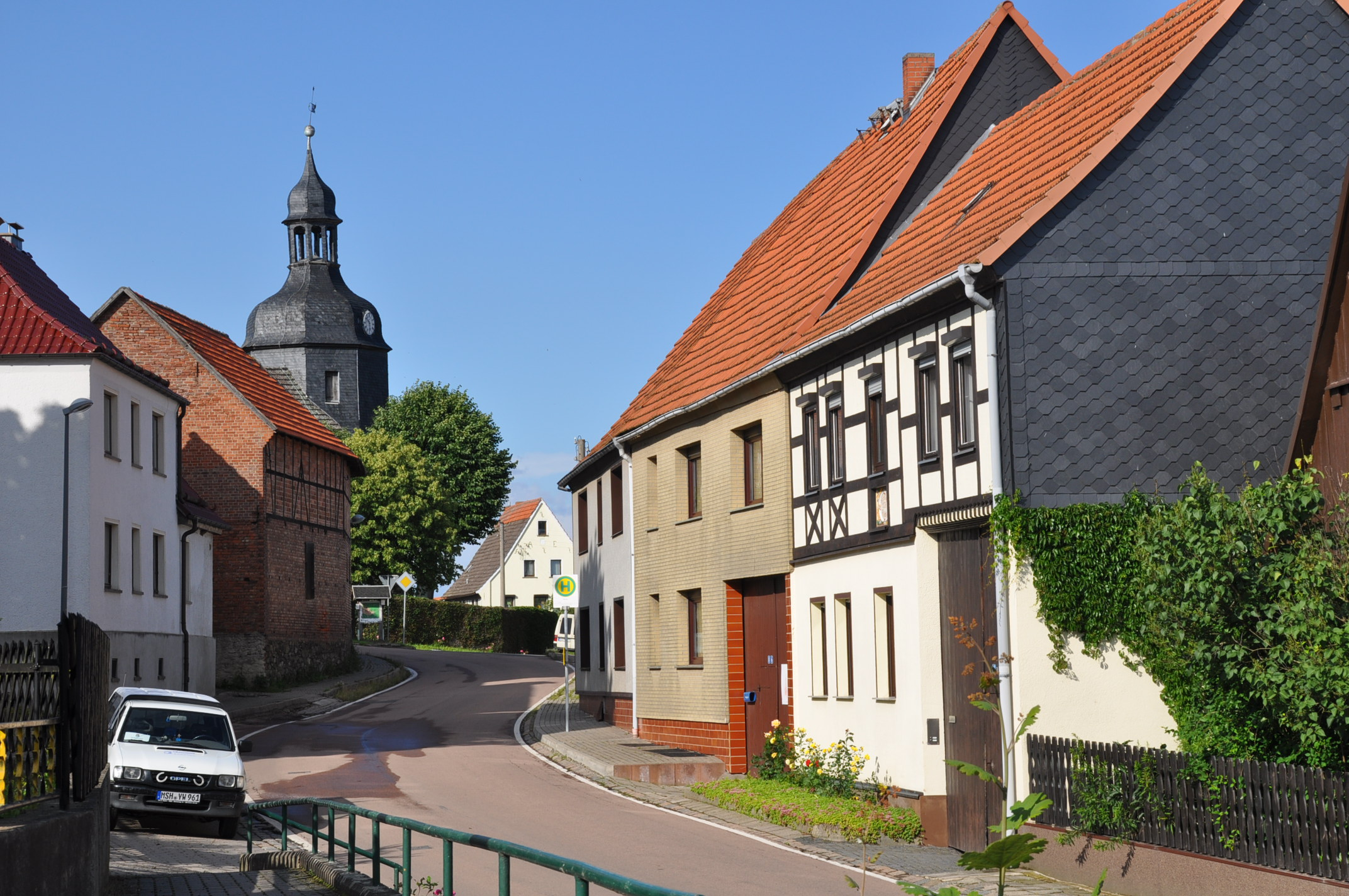
Rothaer Dorfstrasse (Main street)

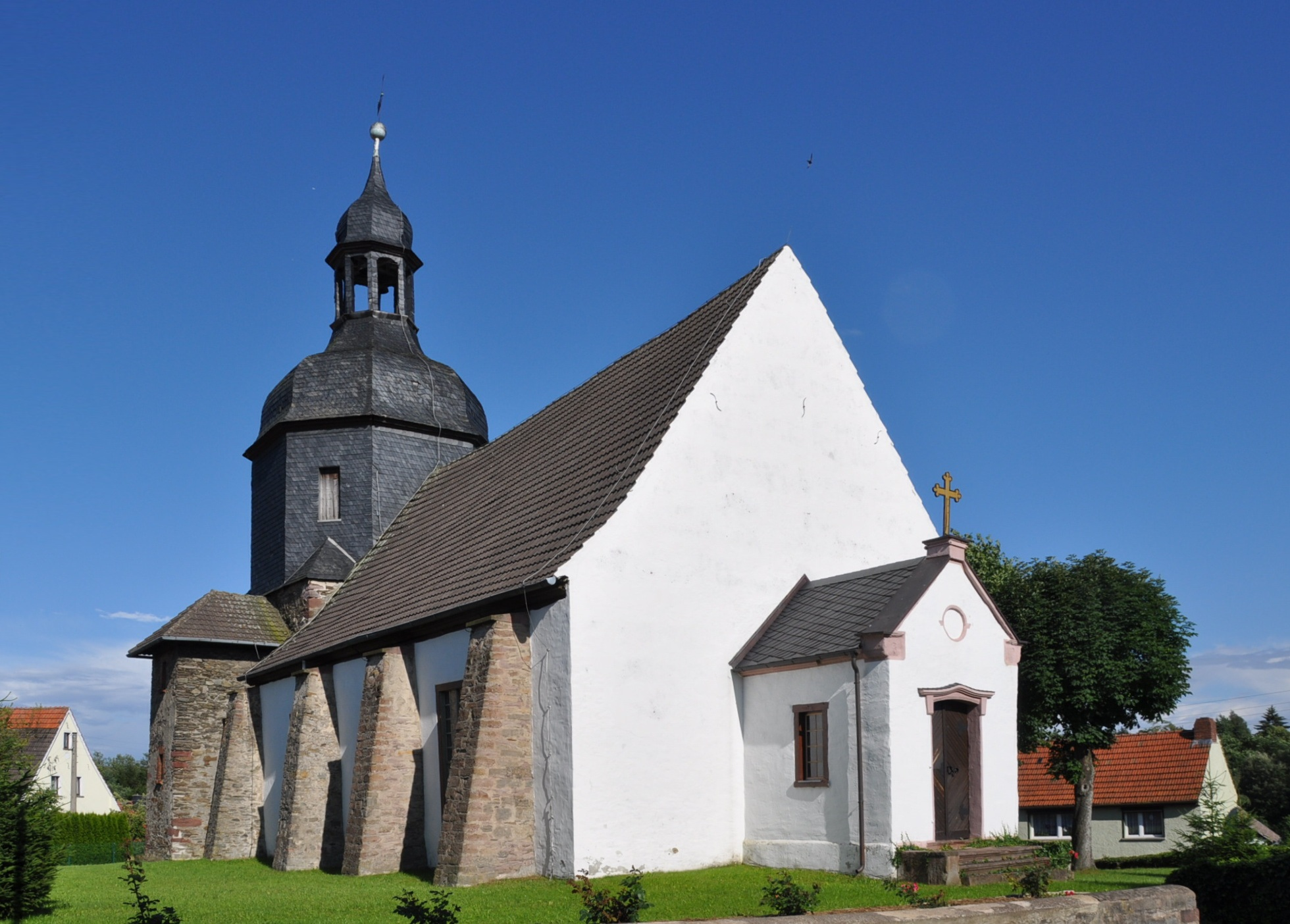
St. Nicholas church

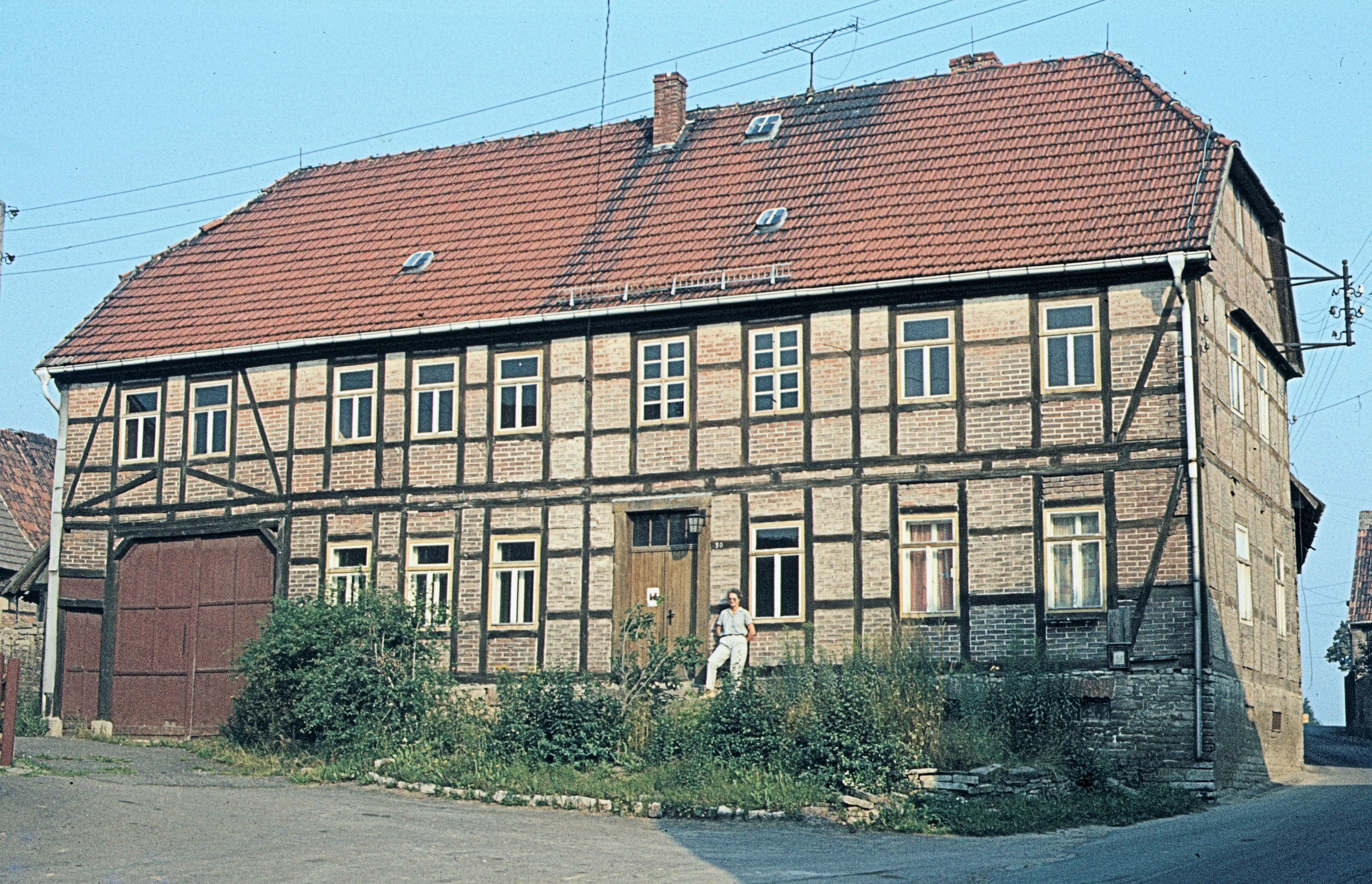
Rectory (1984)
