= Grillenburg (Harz) =

- Grillenberg
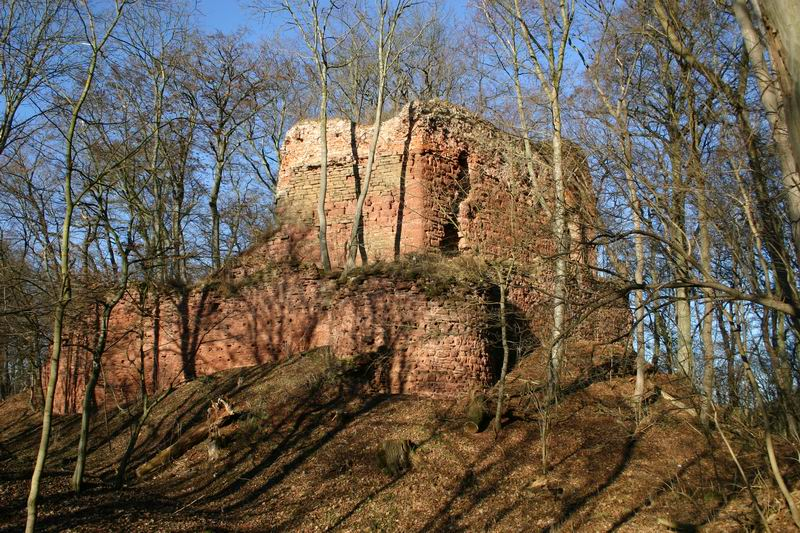
- Grillenburg

Site information
- Type: lowland castle
- Code: DE-ST
- Condition: ruins

Location
- Coordinates: 51°32′4.84″N 11°18′51.86″E
- Height: 0 m above sea level (NN)

Site history
- Built: ca. 1217
- Materials: rusticated ashlar and brick

Garrison information
- Occupants: ministeriales

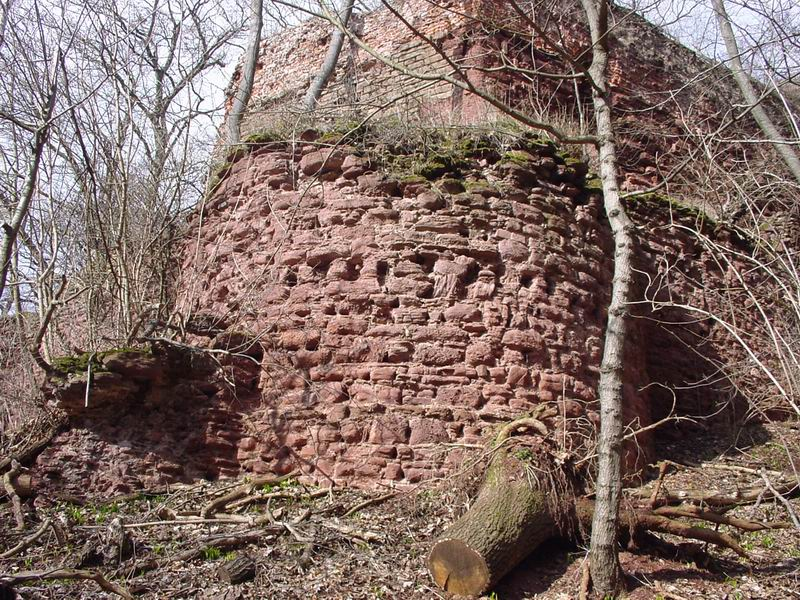
Grillenburg: wall tower and shield wall

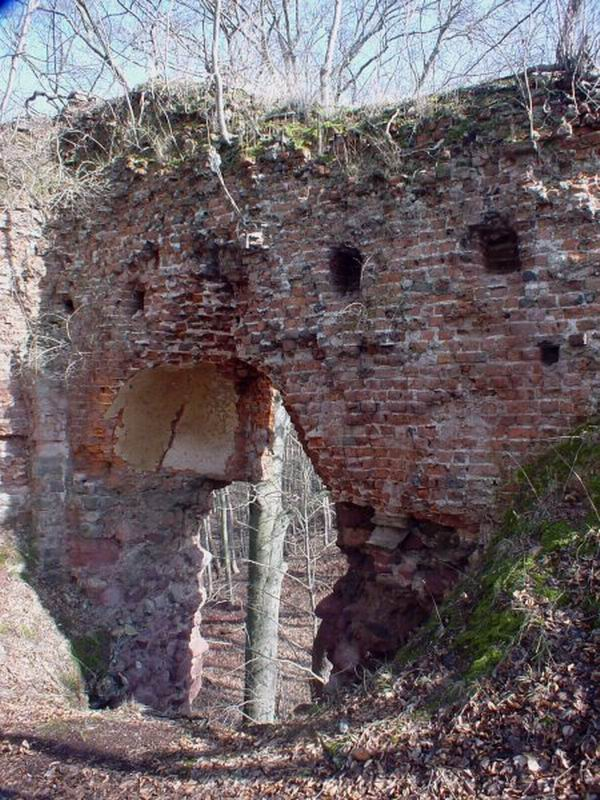
Grillenburg: the ruins of the great hall (Palas)

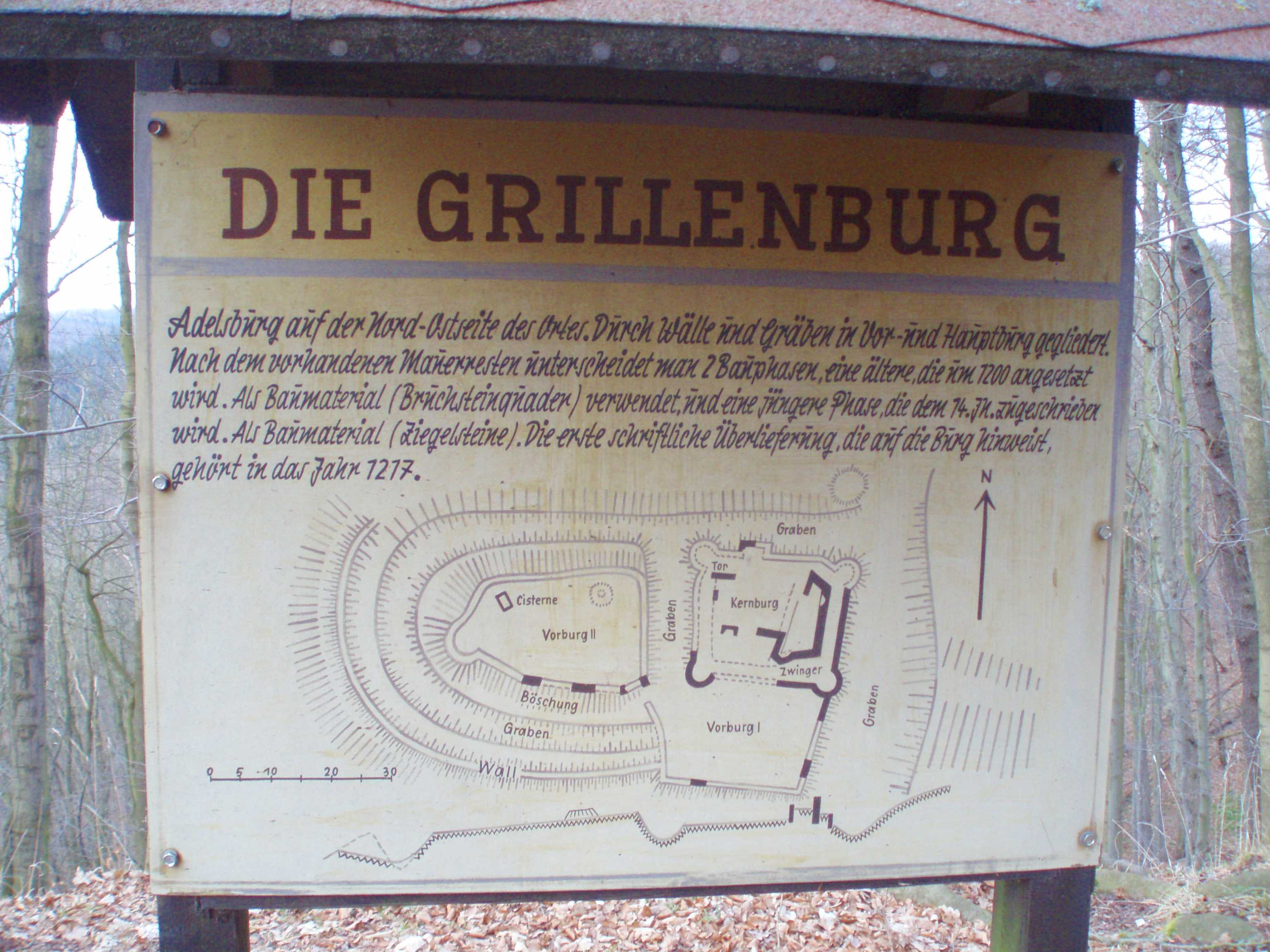
Site plan

The Grillenburg is a ruined medieval castle in Grillenberg in the district of Mansfeld-Südharz in the German state of Saxony-Anhalt. It was a small knight's castle built for a ministerialis.

== History ==
The village of Grillenberg was mentioned as early as 880/890 in the Hersfeld tithe register (German:Hersfelder Zehntverzeichnis). At that time there is no indication of a castle, however. The latter was first recorded when, in 1217, a certain Tidericus de Grellenberch is named as a vassal of the Archbishopric of Magdeburg. The lower parts of the walls of the ruin, made of large rusticated ashlars, must date back to the original Romanesque fortification. In 1286 the marshals (Burgmannen) from the Muser and von Morungen families are named.

In 1347 the Margrave of Meißen, Frederick the Serious, purchased the estate back from the Duke of Brunswick who by then were the joint landlords together with the Margraviate of Landsberg. During the Halberstadt Bishops' Feud, which was prosecuted by Bishop Albert II of Halberstadt (1325-1358) against territorial lords within the Harz region, mainly against the counts of Regenstein, the castle was fought over. It was captured by the Count of Mansfeld in 1362. It is possible that the fieldwork about 100 metres east of the castle was established at that time as a counterwork (Gegenbefestigung).

The second phase of construction recognisable in the wall materials and characterised by brickwork is assessed by the sources as dating to the 14th century.

In 1366 Duke Magnus of Brunswick was the owner of the castle. He exercised from here his rights of patronage over Sittichenbach Abbey. In 1485 the castle once more belonged to the prince-elector, Ernest of Saxony. From him it went into the hands of the Count of Mansfeld.

From at least 1486 the lords of Morungen were vassals at the castle. In 1547 on the death of George of Morungen the lordship fell as an expired fief to the Saxon district (Amt of Sangerhausen. At that time the castle was already falling into decay. The date when it was finally abandoned is unknown.

== Sources ==
- Friedrich Stolberg: Befestigungsanlagen im und am Harz von der Frühgeschichte bis zur Neuzeit. Verlag Lax, Hildesheim 1983
- Georg Dehio: Handbuch der Kunstdenkmäler. Der Bezirk Halle. Akademie-Verlag, Berlin 1976
- Handbuch der historischen Stätten Deutschlands, Provinz Sachsen Anhalt. Alfred Kröner Verlag, Stuttgart 1987
- Hermann Wäscher: Feudalburgen in den Bezirken Halle und Magdeburg. Henschelverlag Kunst und Gesellschaft, Berlin 1962
- Paul Grimm: Die vor- und frühgeschichtlichen Burgwälle der Bezirke Halle und Magdeburg. Akademie-Verlag, Berlin 1958
