= Wolferstedt =

- Ortschaft of Allstedt
- Interactive map of Wolferstedt
- Location within Germany Location within Saxony-Anhalt
- Coordinates: 51°26′N 11°26′E
- Country: Germany
- State: Saxony-Anhalt
- District: Mansfeld-Südharz
- Town: Allstedt

Area
  - Total: 15.00 km^{2} (5.79 sq mi)
- Elevation: 149 m (489 ft)

Population (2013)
  - Total: 686
  - Density: 45.7/km^{2} (118/sq mi)
- Time zone: UTC+01:00 (CET)
  - Summer (DST): UTC+02:00 (CEST)
- Postal codes: 06542
- Dialling codes: 034652

Wolferstedt is a village and a former municipality in the Mansfeld-Südharz district, Saxony-Anhalt, Germany. Since 1 January 2010, it is part of the town Allstedt, of which it forms an Ortschaft.
