= Johann Augustin Kobelius =

Johann Augustin Kobelius (21 February 1674 – 17 August 1731) was a German Baroque composer and Kapellmeister at the court of Saxe-Weissenfels.

== Life and work ==
Kobelius was born in Wählitz near Hohenmölsen, the son of August Kobelius, a pastor from Landshut in Bavaria. His first music teacher was his maternal grandfather, who worked in Weissenfels as an organist. He later studied with Johann Christian Schieferdecker and Johann Philipp Krieger, then Kapellmeister at the Weissenfels court. Eventually, Kobelius travels took him until Venice.

"In 1702 the reigning Duke of Saxe-Weissenfels secured Kobelius' appointment as organist at St. Jacobi in Sangerhausen, overruling the town's choice of J. S. Bach." This was probably the only occasion in Bach's career that an upheld application on his part resulted in failure. From 1703 Kobelius also worked as municipal choirmaster.

Since 1725, the position of Landrentmeister (chamberlain) placed him well above the status of Hofkapellmeister. "Kobelius was the last important composer to write operas during the brief but brilliant period of music at the Weissenfels court." Instead of the court conductor Johann Philipp Krieger from 1715 to 1729 Kobelius "served as the only regular composer of operas for performances in the royal palace, writing one score or more each year."

Only one work of Kobelius has been preserved: his Cantata Ich fürchte keinen Tod auf Erden, which had its modern première as recently as 2010.
