= Katharinenrieth =

- Ortschaft of Allstedt
- Interactive map of Katharinenrieth
- Location within Germany Location within Saxony-Anhalt
- Coordinates: 51°25′N 11°21′E
- Country: Germany
- State: Saxony-Anhalt
- District: Mansfeld-Südharz
- Town: Allstedt

Area
  - Total: 5.70 km^{2} (2.20 sq mi)
- Elevation: 124 m (407 ft)

Population (2013)
  - Total: 211
  - Density: 37.0/km^{2} (95.9/sq mi)
- Time zone: UTC+01:00 (CET)
  - Summer (DST): UTC+02:00 (CEST)
- Postal codes: 06542
- Dialling codes: 034652

Katharinenrieth is a village and a former municipality in the Mansfeld-Südharz district, Saxony-Anhalt, Germany. Since 1 January 2010, it is part of the town Allstedt, of which it forms an Ortschaft.
