= Emseloh =

- Ortschaft of Allstedt
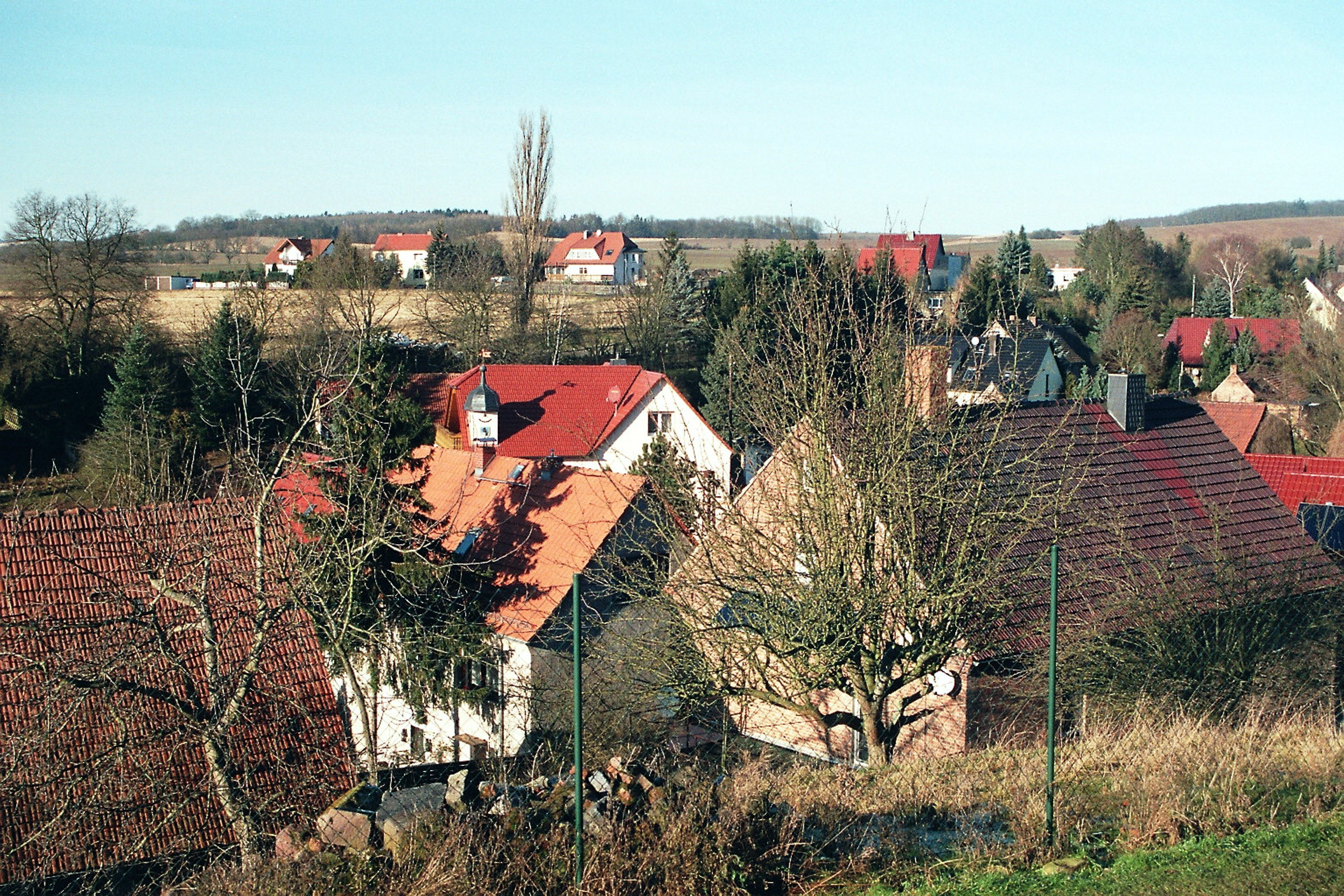
- Emseloh (Allstedt)
- Interactive map of Emseloh
- Location within Germany Location within Saxony-Anhalt
- Coordinates: 51°30′N 11°24′E
- Country: Germany
- State: Saxony-Anhalt
- District: Mansfeld-Südharz
- Town: Allstedt

Area
  - Total: 11.33 km^{2} (4.37 sq mi)
- Elevation: 302 m (991 ft)

Population (2013)
  - Total: 557
  - Density: 49.2/km^{2} (127/sq mi)
- Time zone: UTC+01:00 (CET)
  - Summer (DST): UTC+02:00 (CEST)
- Postal codes: 06528
- Dialling codes: 034659

Emseloh is a village and a former municipality in the Mansfeld-Südharz district, Saxony-Anhalt, Germany. Since 1 January 2010, it is part of the town Allstedt, of which it forms an Ortschaft.
