= Nienstedt =

- Ortschaft of Allstedt
- Interactive map of Nienstedt
- Location within Germany Location within Saxony-Anhalt
- Coordinates: 51°26′30″N 11°23′50″E
- Country: Germany
- State: Saxony-Anhalt
- District: Mansfeld-Südharz
- Town: Allstedt

Area
  - Total: 9.96 km^{2} (3.85 sq mi)
- Elevation: 160 m (520 ft)

Population (2013)
  - Total: 363
  - Density: 36.4/km^{2} (94.4/sq mi)
- Time zone: UTC+01:00 (CET)
  - Summer (DST): UTC+02:00 (CEST)
- Postal codes: 06542
- Dialling codes: 034652

Nienstedt is a village and a former municipality in the Mansfeld-Südharz district, Saxony-Anhalt, Germany. Since 1 January 2010, it has been a part of the town Allstedt. Together with the village Einzingen, it forms an Ortschaft of the town Allstedt.

The earliest known reference to the village is in a record from AD 899, where it is referred to as Ninstat.
