= Beyernaumburg =

- Ortschaft of Allstedt
- Interactive map of Beyernaumburg
- Location within Germany Location within Saxony-Anhalt
- Coordinates: 51°28′23″N 11°23′43″E
- Country: Germany
- State: Saxony-Anhalt
- District: Mansfeld-Südharz
- Town: Allstedt

Area
  - Total: 12.61 km^{2} (4.87 sq mi)
- Elevation: 247 m (810 ft)

Population (2013)
  - Total: 804
  - Density: 63.8/km^{2} (165/sq mi)
- Time zone: UTC+01:00 (CET)
  - Summer (DST): UTC+02:00 (CEST)
- Postal codes: 06528
- Dialling codes: 03464

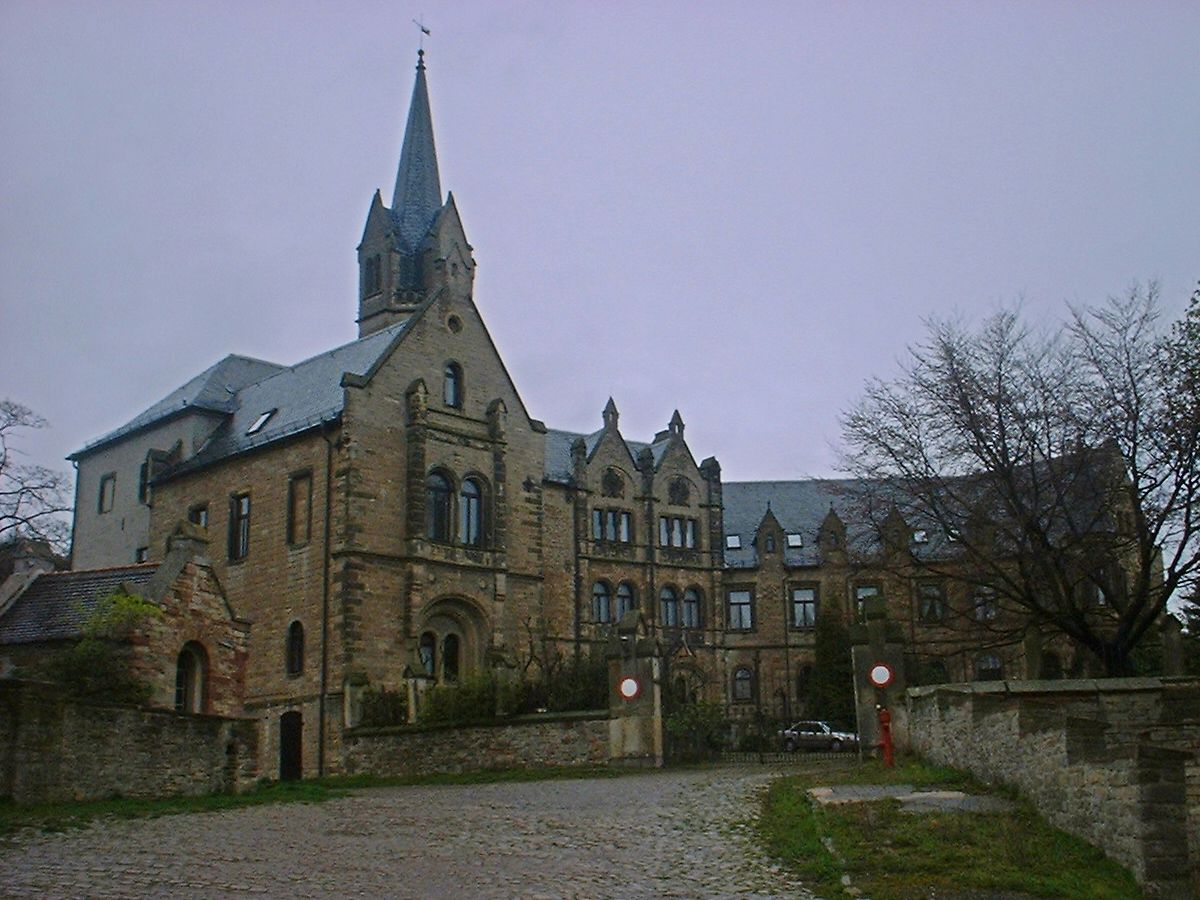
Castle

Beyernaumburg is a village and a former municipality in the Mansfeld-Südharz district, Saxony-Anhalt, Germany. Since 1 January 2010, it is part of the town Allstedt, of which it forms an Ortschaft (with the village Othal).
