= Allstedt =

- Town
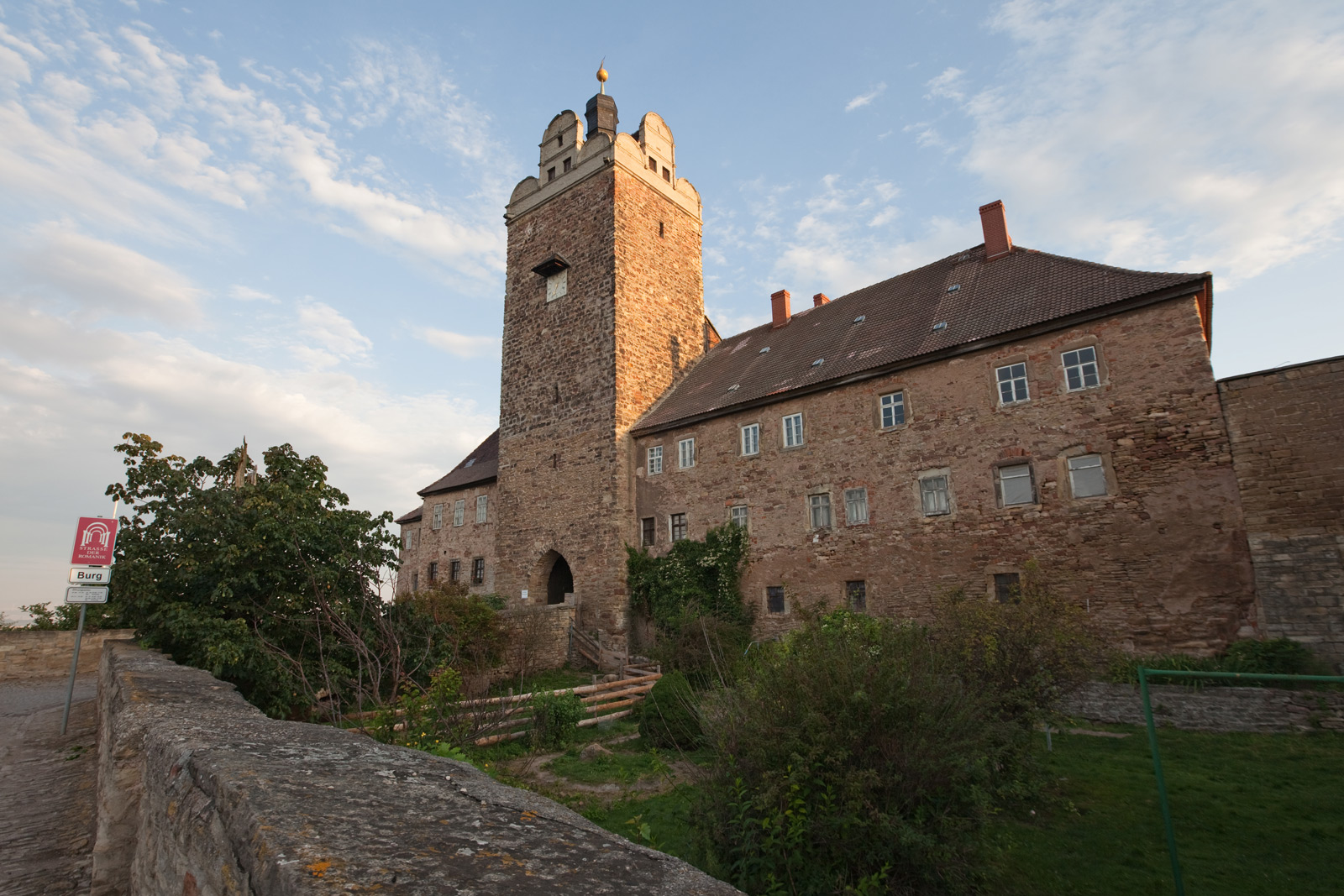
- Allstedt Castle

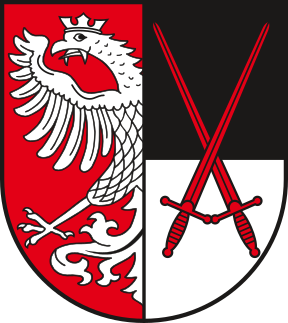
- Coat of arms

- Location of Allstedt within Mansfeld-Südharz district
- Interactive map of Allstedt
- Location within Germany Location within Saxony-Anhalt
- Coordinates: 51°24′N 11°23′E
- Country: Germany
- State: Saxony-Anhalt
- District: Mansfeld-Südharz

Government
  - Mayor (2024–31): Daniel Kirchner

Area
  - Total: 149.81 km^{2} (57.84 sq mi)
- Elevation: 140 m (460 ft)

Population (2025-12-31)
  - Total: 7,528
  - Density: 50.25/km^{2} (130.1/sq mi)
- Time zone: UTC+01:00 (CET)
  - Summer (DST): UTC+02:00 (CEST)
- Postal codes: 06542
- Dialling codes: 03464, 034652, 034659
- Vehicle registration: MSH, EIL, HET, ML, SGH
- Website: www.allstedt.com

Allstedt (German pronunciation: [ˈalʃtɛt]) is a town in the district of Mansfeld-Südharz, in Saxony-Anhalt, Germany. It is situated approximatively 10 km southeast of Sangerhausen.

== History ==
Allstedt is mentioned as the tithable place Altstedi in Friesenfeld in the Hersfeld Tithe Register, created between 881 and 899. Henry the Fowler signed a charter in Allstedt in the year 935. Allstedt became a royal court, later an imperial palace. The now-extinct ministerial noble family "von Allstedt" had its ancestral seat here from the 12th century until the mid-14th century.

Around 1200, the Wigberti Church was newly built in stone. Allstedt was granted town rights in 1425, and from 1516 the town used a seal. Thomas Müntzer became pastor at St. John's Church in 1523. He preached in the German language. On 13 July 1524, he delivered the "Sermon to the Princes" in the castle chapel before Duke John and Elector Frederick. A new school was mentioned in 1568, and since 1570, wine-growing yields have been documented.

During the Thirty Years’ War, the soldiers of Wallenstein, Tilly, and Gustavus Adolphus were stationed in Allstedt. In 1681, the plague struck Allstedt: from May to December, 817 people in the town died. The new St. John’s Church was consecrated in 1765.

Johann Wolfgang von Goethe often stayed in Allstedt on state business between 1776 and 1802. At the castle, he wrote, among other things, several acts of his Iphigenia.

The first Allstedter Wochenblatt newspaper appeared in 1840.

Within the German Empire (1871–1918), Allstedt was part of the Grand Duchy of Saxe-Weimar-Eisenach. In 1920, Allstedt became an exclave of the state of Thuringia within the district of Weimar.

A sugar factory was built in 1851, a malt factory in 1885, and a metalworks in 1890. In 1894, Allstedt was connected to the railway network via the Oberröblingen–Allstedt line. In 1899, the town received street lighting with gas lanterns. In 1922, Allstedt was connected to the power grid.

On April 11, 1945, Allstedt was bombed by U.S. Air Forces. Eleven people were killed and significant damage was caused to buildings. Shortly thereafter, American forces entered Allstedt. The master painter Robert Deterra had arranged for white flags to be raised, for which he was sentenced to death by the mayor and local NSDAP group leader, Conrad Kirst. However, in the chaos of the occupation, Deterra managed to escape and save his life.

In July, the Red Army took over its occupation zone. Denazification began, and the dismantling of factories commenced. Refugees and expellees from the German eastern territories arrived in Allstedt, which was assigned to the district of Sangerhausen in the Province of Saxony as of October 1, 1945.

Land reform began in 1946. In 1947, Allstedt was flooded by high water. In 1952, construction of a Red Army airfield began. Agricultural collectivization took place in 1960. In 1973, the Reichsbahn discontinued passenger service between Oberröblingen and Allstedt.

The castle was renovated in 1974 and a museum was established.

In 2010 Allstedt absorbed 12 former municipalities, that became subdivisions of the town.

== Mayor ==
The independent candidate Daniel Kirchner was elected mayor of Allstedt on 25 February 2024 after winning the runoff election against CDU candidate Jürgen Richter, who was first elected mayor of Allstedt in 2003.

== Geography ==
The town Allstedt consists of the following 13 Ortschaften or municipal divisions:

- Allstedt
- Beyernaumburg
- Emseloh
- Holdenstedt
- Katharinenrieth
- Liedersdorf
- Mittelhausen
- Niederröblingen
- Nienstedt
- Pölsfeld
- Sotterhausen
- Winkel
- Wolferstedt

The town is located a few kilometers from the Thuringian state border. Two rivers flow through the town’s territory: the smaller Rohne, which comes from the Hornburg saddle in the northeast, and the larger Helme, which approaches from the west and turns south at Katharinenrieth to join the Unstrut. Together with the Unstrut, the Helme forms a fertile plain known as Das Ried in Goldene Aue.

North of Allstedt begin the foothills of the southern Harz Mountains, and to the west rises the distinctive Kyffhäuser range. To the south, beyond the wide Unstrut valley, lies the ridge of the Hohe Schrecke, and to the east, past the hilly terrain beyond Querfurt, the land gradually slopes down toward the Saale River. Southeast of Allstedt is the Saale-Unstrut-Triasland Nature Park.

== Climate ==
The annual precipitation is 488 mm, which is extremely low. It ranks among the lowest 5% of values recorded in Germany. Only 2% of the weather stations operated by the German Meteorological Service (DWD) register lower values. February is the driest month, while the highest rainfall occurs in June. In June, precipitation is 2.1 times higher than in February. Seasonal variation in precipitation is moderate; 51% of weather stations record lower annual fluctuations.

== Religion ==
From the 12th century until 1538, the Augustinian Canons monastery of Kaltenborn was located near Allstedt. In April 1525, it was plundered and devastated by residents of the villages of Riestedt and Emseloh.

The residents and church of Allstedt became Protestant during the Reformation.

The St. Johannis Baptist Church in Allstedt is part of the Eisleben-Sömmerda church district within the Evangelical Church in Central Germany.

The Catholic St. Wigbert Chapel has belonged to the Sangerhausen parish in the Merseburg deanery of the Diocese of Magdeburg since 2010. Until 1994, Catholics in Allstedt were formally part of the Diocese of Fulda. However, due to the Inner German border, they were administratively assigned to the Episcopal Office of Erfurt-Meiningen.

In 1994, the parish curate of Allstedt was transferred from the parish of Bad Frankenhausen (Erfurt-Meiningen) to the newly established Diocese of Magdeburg. The chapel was deconsecrated by decree on 28 August 2023, with the final service held on 21 October 2023. The monthly Saturday vigil mass that was previously held in the chapel has since been celebrated in the Protestant church.

== Notable residents ==
- Johann Karl Wilhelm Voigt (1752–1821), mineralogist
- Adolph Schmidt (1815–1903), jurist
- Otto Piltz (1846–1910), painter

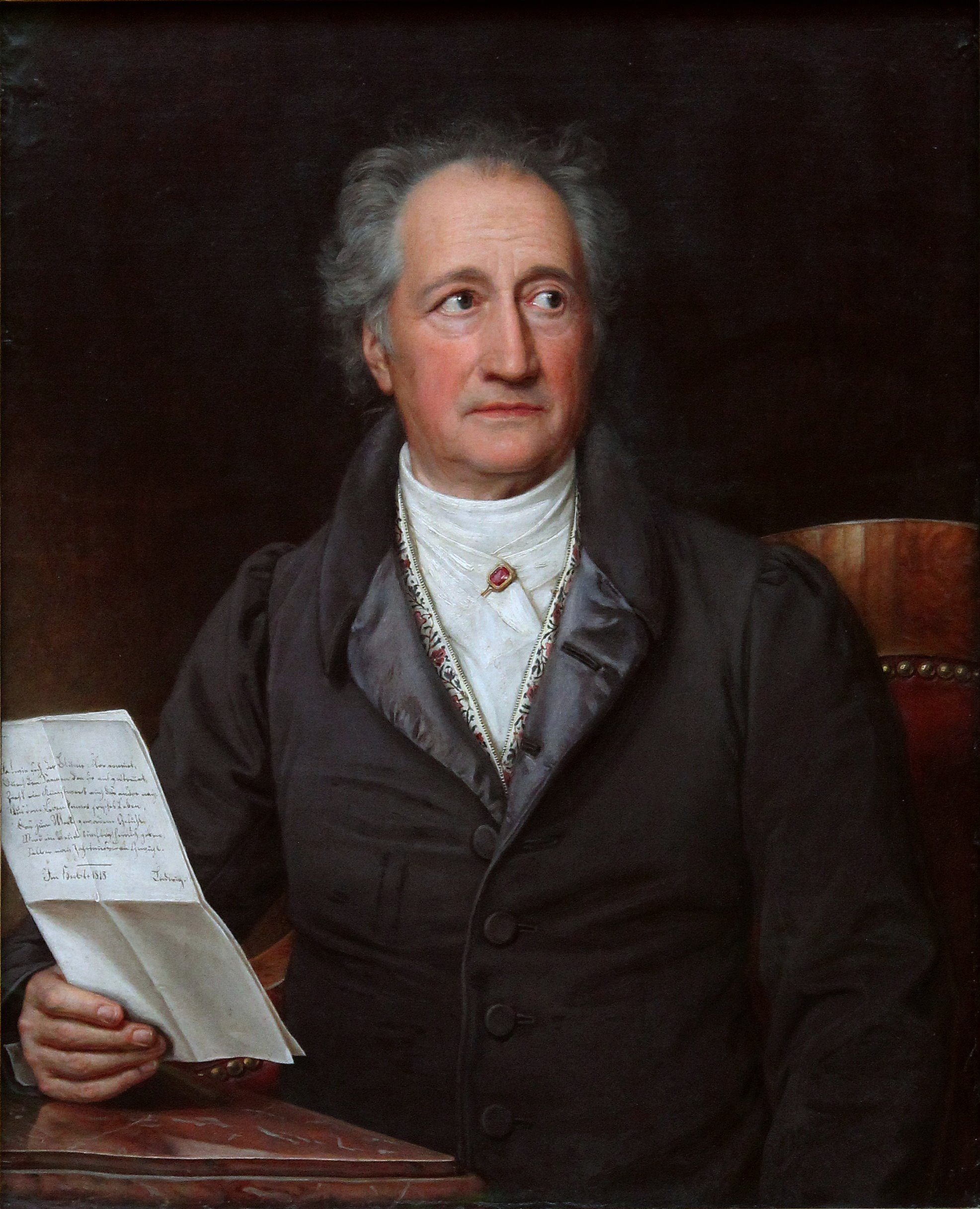
Johann Wolfgang von Goethe (1828)

- Melchior Acontius, humanist and poet (1515–1569 in Allstedt)
- Gottfried Arnold, Lutheran theologian, (1700–1704) court preacher in Allstedt
- Johann Wolfgang von Goethe, (1749–1832), acted several years at Castle Allstedt
- Thomas Müntzer, (c. 1489 – 1525), acted in 1523–1525 Allstedt
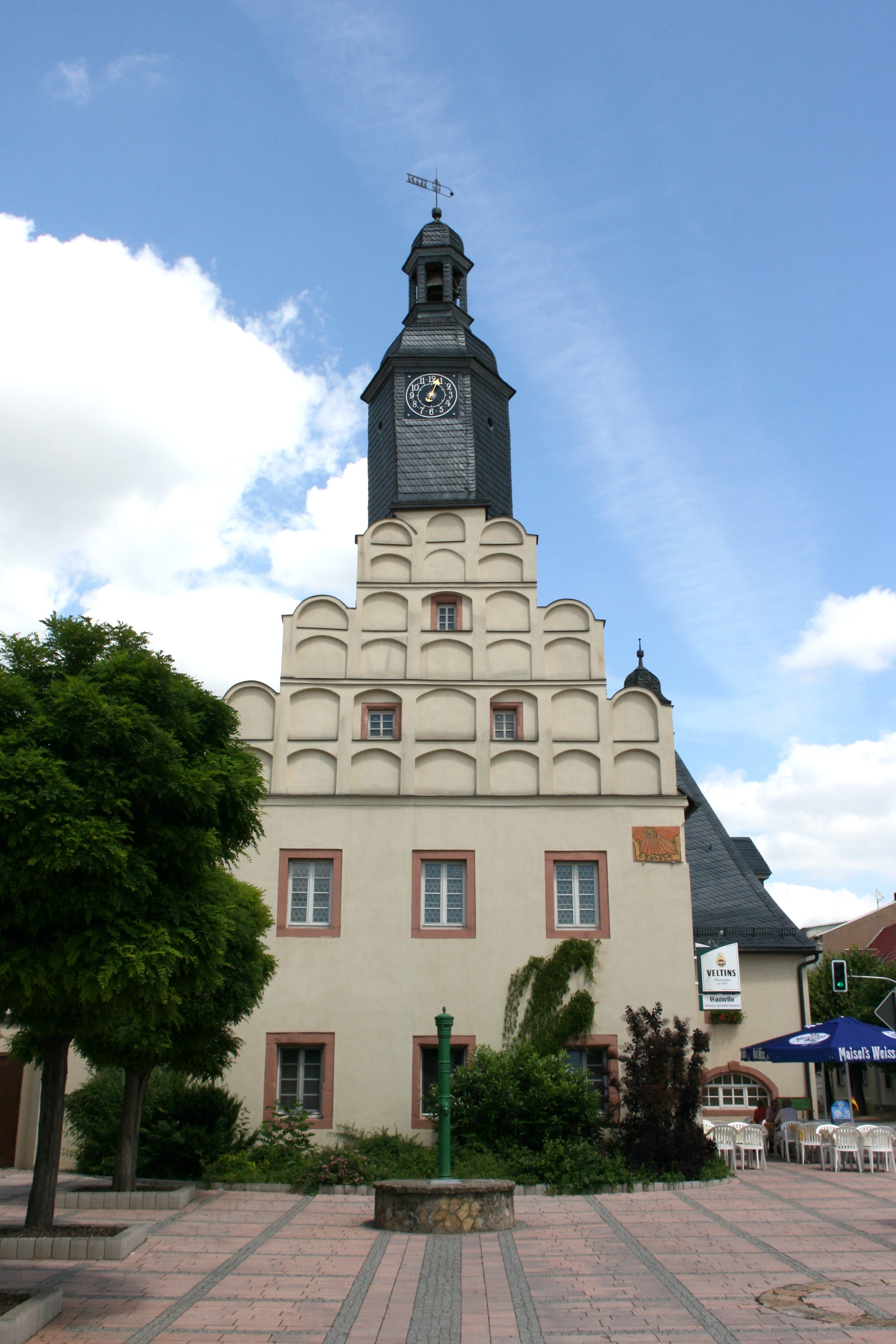
Town Hall

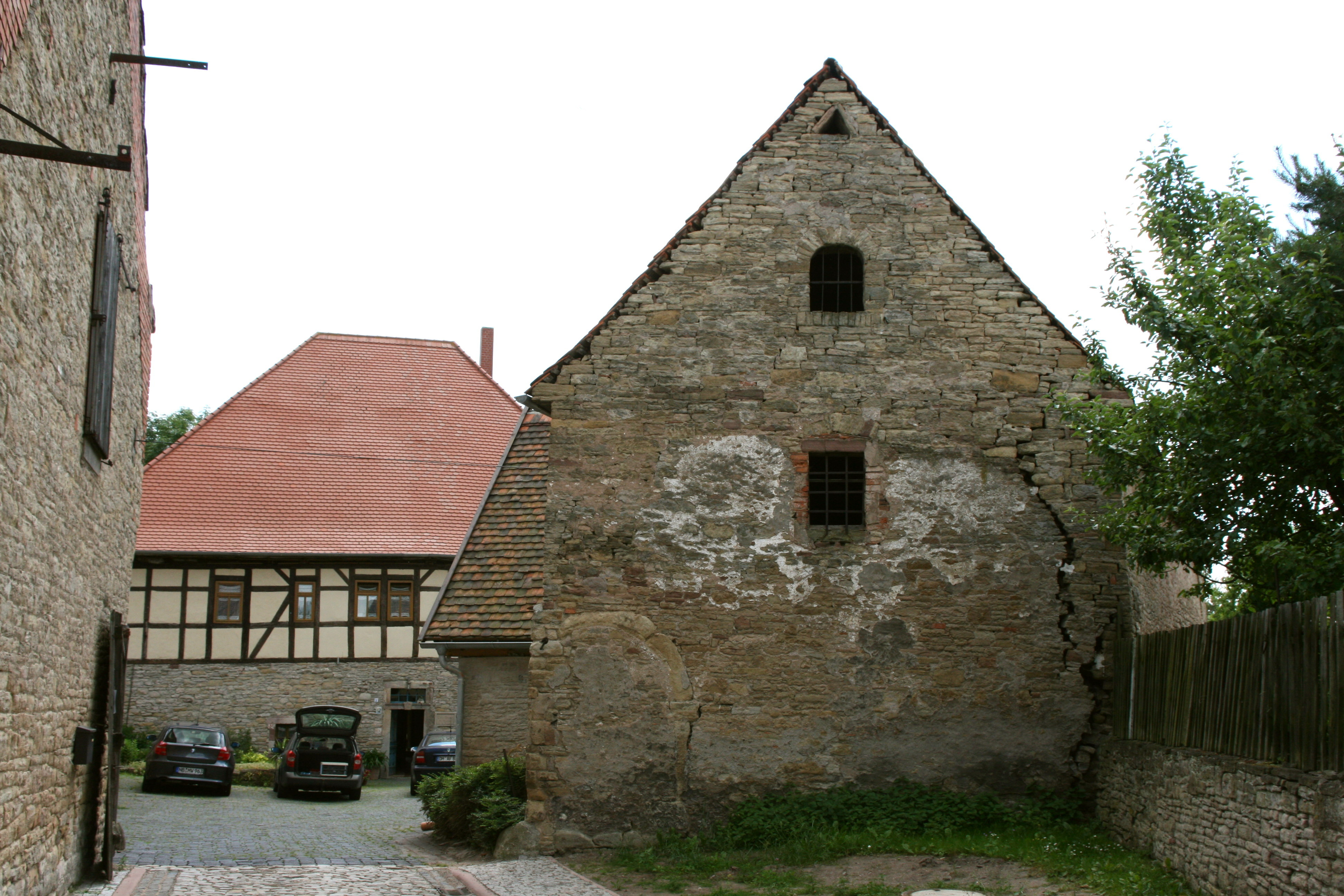
Mill

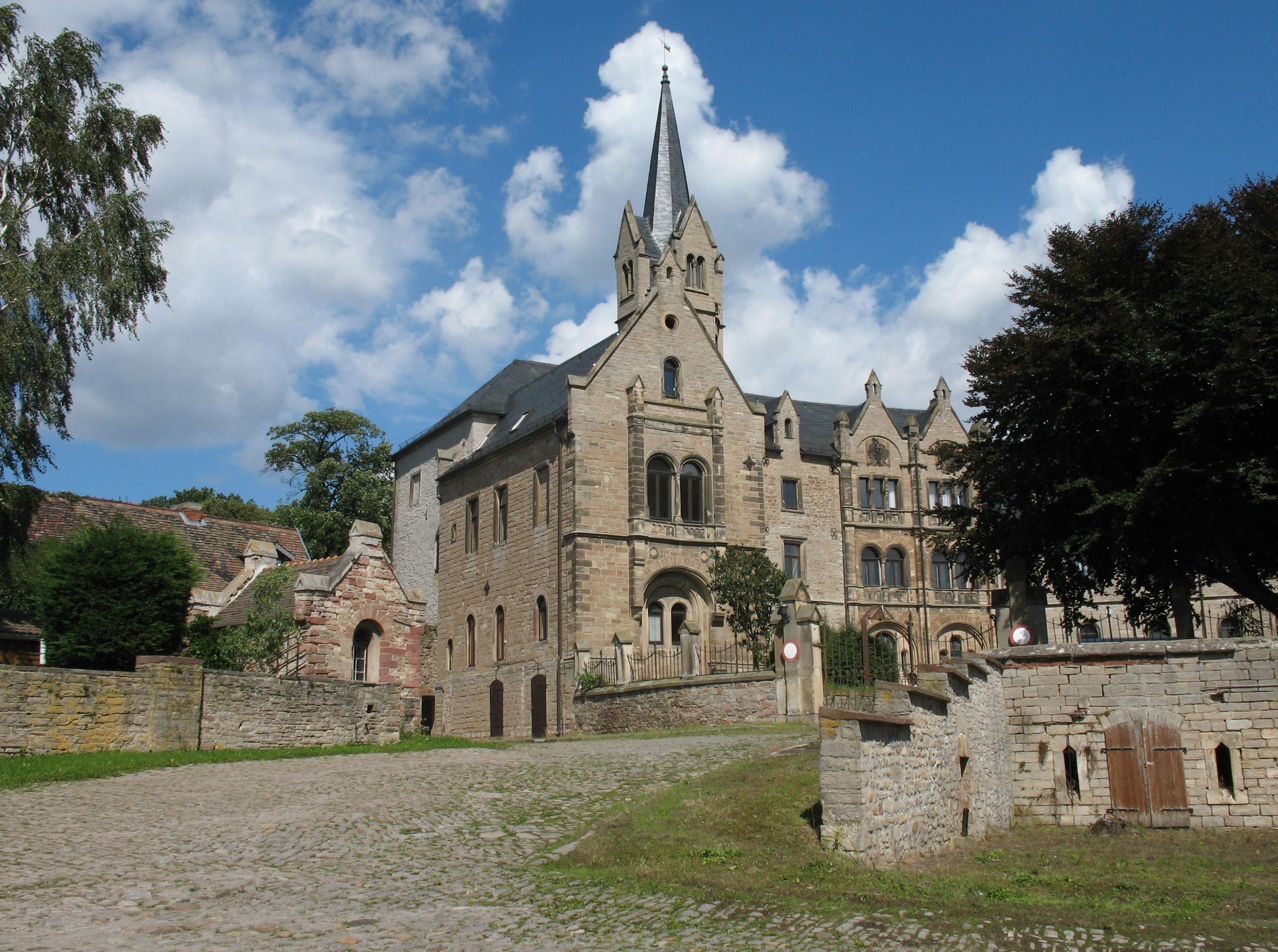
Beyernaumburg Castle

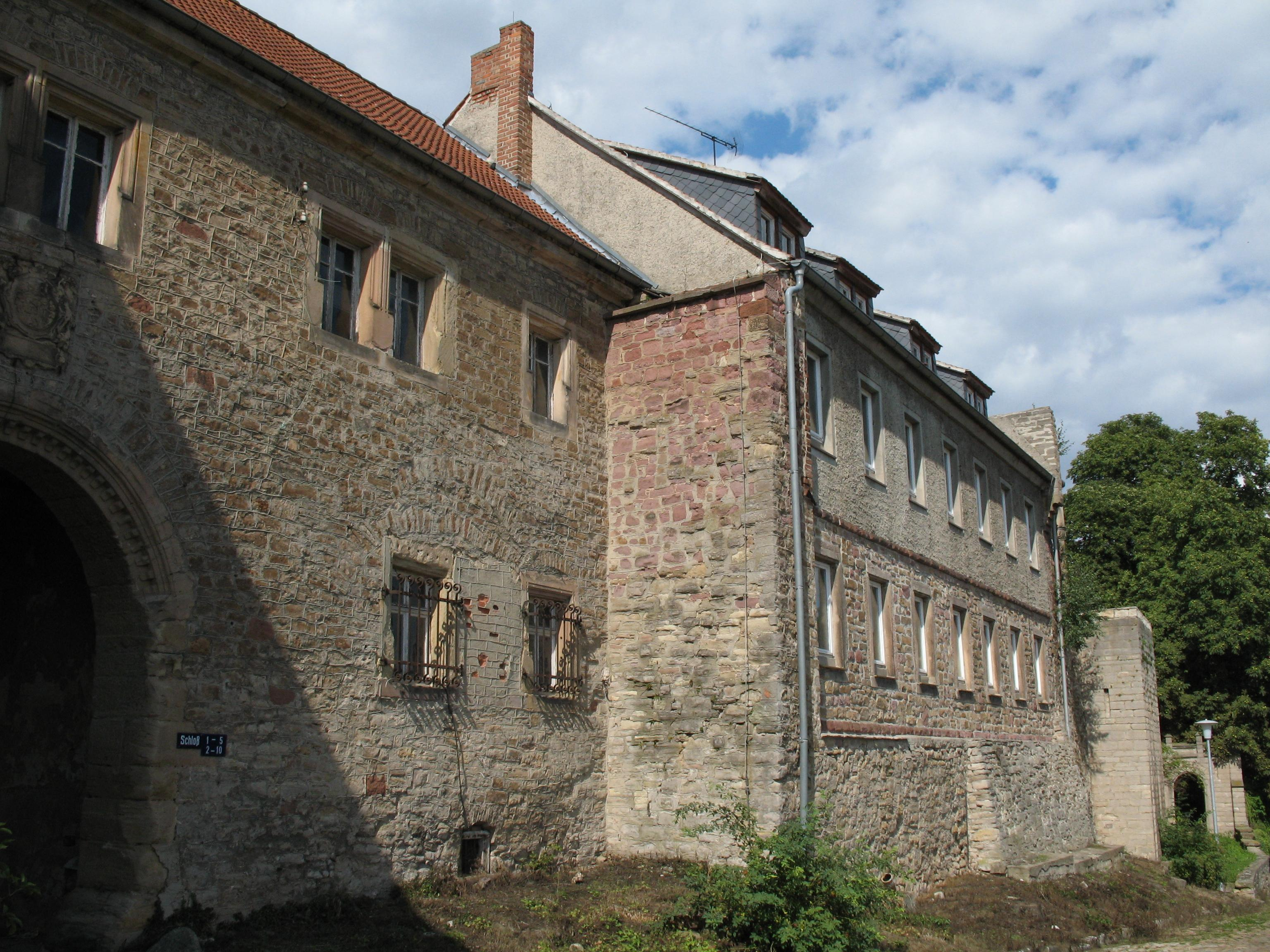
Beyernaumburg Castle
