= Pölsfeld =

- Ortschaft of Allstedt
- Interactive map of Pölsfeld
- Location within Germany Location within Saxony-Anhalt
- Coordinates: 51°32′N 11°21′E
- Country: Germany
- State: Saxony-Anhalt
- District: Mansfeld-Südharz
- Town: Allstedt

Area
  - Total: 11.59 km^{2} (4.47 sq mi)
- Elevation: 285 m (935 ft)

Population (2013)
  - Total: 383
  - Density: 33.0/km^{2} (85.6/sq mi)
- Time zone: UTC+01:00 (CET)
  - Summer (DST): UTC+02:00 (CEST)
- Postal codes: 06528
- Dialling codes: 03464
- Website: www.poelsfeld.de

Pölsfeld is a village and a former municipality in the Mansfeld-Südharz district, Saxony-Anhalt, Germany. Since 1 January 2010, it is part of the town Allstedt, of which it forms an Ortschaft.
