= Grillenberg (Sangerhausen) =

- Stadtteil of Sangerhausen
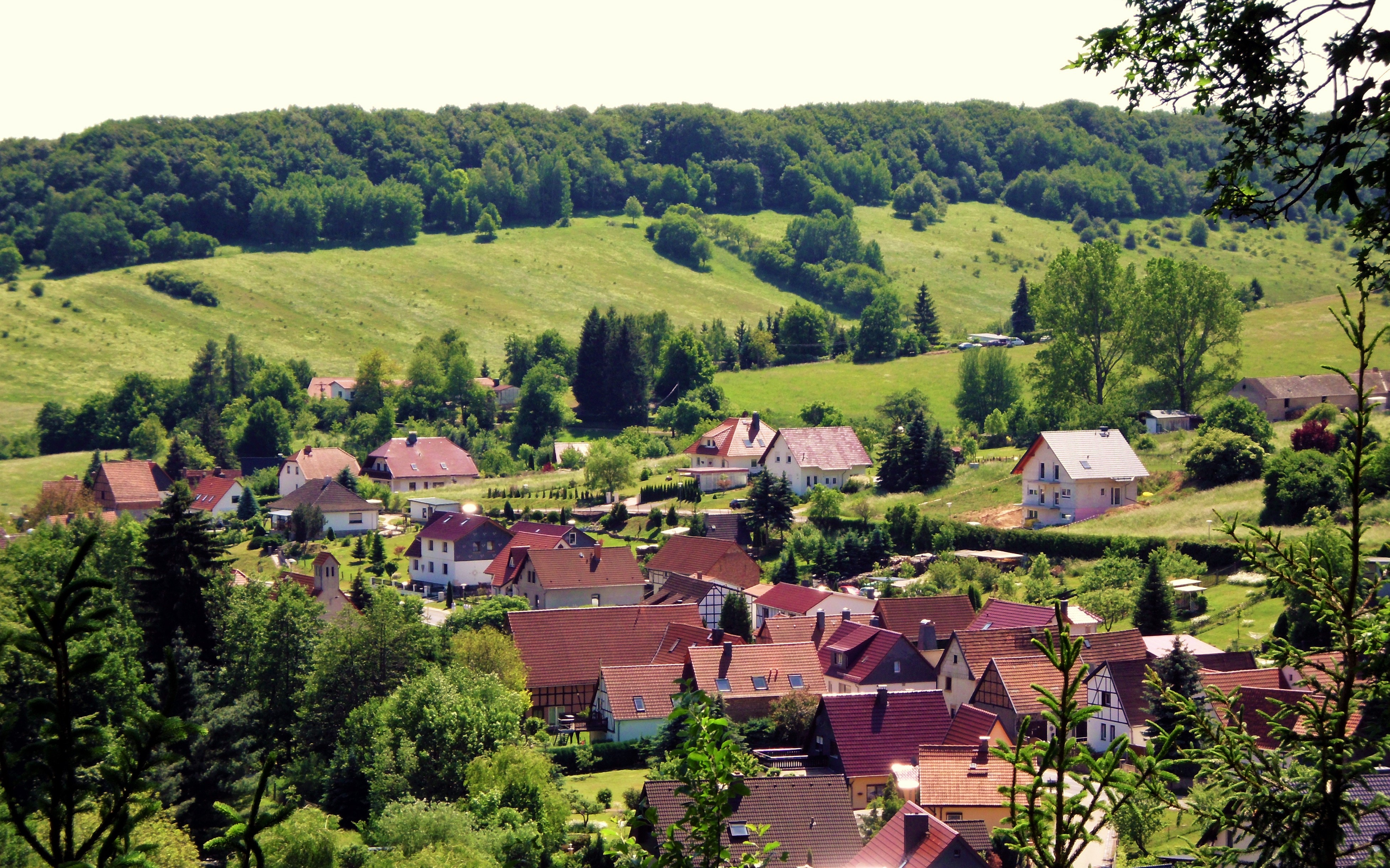

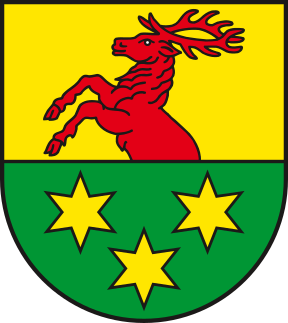
- Coat of arms

- Location of Grillenberg in Sangerhausen
- Interactive map of Grillenberg
- Location within Germany Location within Saxony-Anhalt
- Coordinates: 51°31′58″N 11°18′38″E
- Country: Germany
- State: Saxony-Anhalt
- District: Mansfeld-Südharz
- Town: Sangerhausen

Area
  - Total: 9 km^{2} (3.5 sq mi)
- Elevation: 244 m (801 ft)

Population (2020)
  - Total: 274
  - Density: 30/km^{2} (79/sq mi)
- Time zone: UTC+01:00 (CET)
  - Summer (DST): UTC+02:00 (CEST)
- Postal codes: 06528
- Dialling codes: 03464

Grillenberg is a village in the municipality of Sangerhausen in the German state of Saxony-Anhalt.

== Location ==
The village is around 9 kilometres north of Sangerhausen on the edge of the Harz mountains. Since 27 November 2006 Grillenberg has borne the title "state-recognised resort" (Staatlich anerkannter Erholungsort).

== History ==
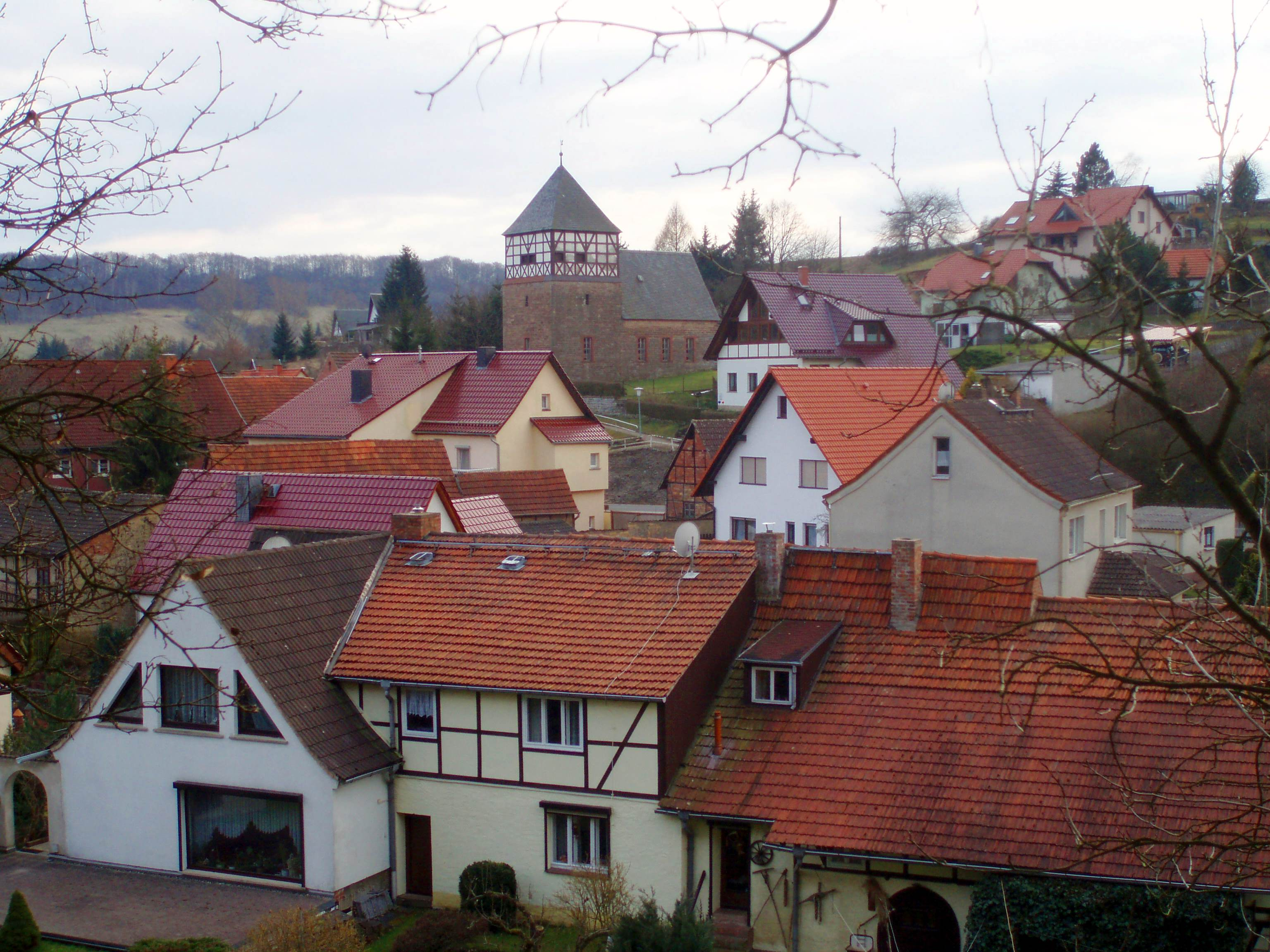
View of the village church

Grillenberg was probably first recorded in the register of the tithes of Hersfeld Abbey dating to between 881 and 899, as the tithe-owing village of 'Coriledorpf'. In 1147 the Grilleberg Castle estate (Burgamt Grillenberg) appears as part of the old Barony of Sangerhausen. The estate was detached and given to the Thuringian count, Lambertius (of Gleichen), who called himself comes de Monte ("count of the hill"). The owners and managers of the castle estate changed hands. In 1361, the castle, estate and village were seized in a feud by the Count of Mansfeld. In 1362 he had to return it again. The farmers of the village had all taxes and services waived for three years because, during the siege of the castle they had suffered much damage. In 1430 22 deserted villages were mentioned that belonged to the castle estate. In 1525, management of the castle estate moved to Sangerhausen. The last occupant of the castle in 1683 was the Royal Forester and Armourer (Königliche Forst- und Zeugknecht), Hans Lehmann.

The village church, which has existed since the 13th century, is dedicated to Saint Nicholas.

Prospecting was carried out here for copper, silver and stone coal.

Dorothea Krause was burned in 1608 for being a witch. In 1614, a woman was banished from the land having survived torture twice.

On 1 October 1972 the village was incorporated administratively into Obersdorf. On 21 March 1990 it became independent again.

Until 2005 Grillenberg was a politically independent municipality. On 1 October 2005 it was incorporated into Sangerhausen once more.
