= Sangerhausen =

Town in Saxony-Anhalt, Germany

- Town
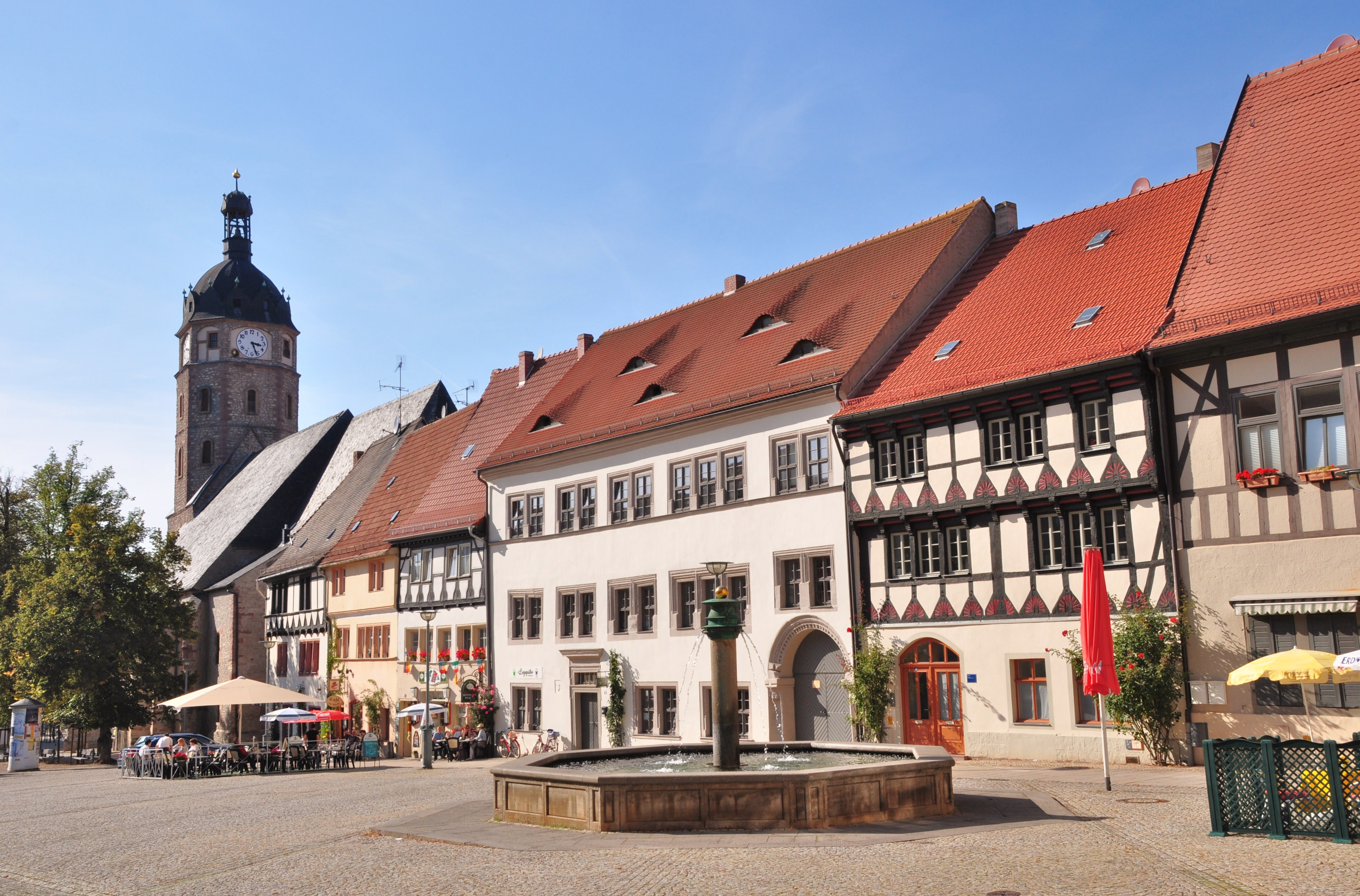
- Sangerhausen

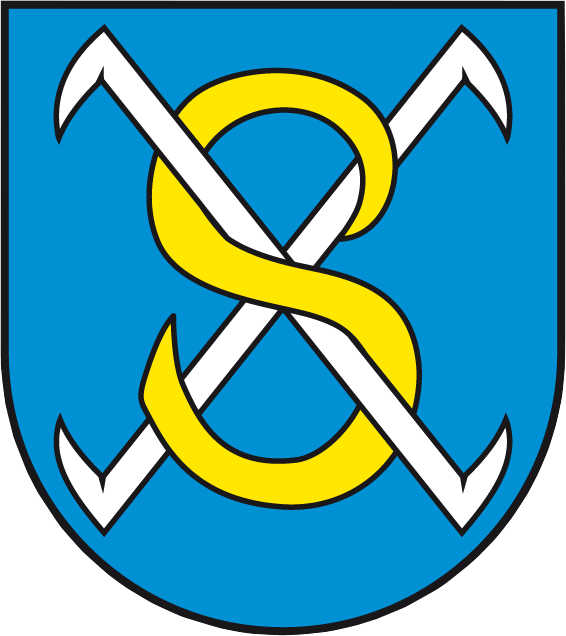
- Coat of arms

- Location of Sangerhausen within Mansfeld-Südharz district
- Interactive map of Sangerhausen
- Location within Germany Location within Saxony-Anhalt
- Coordinates: 51°28′N 11°18′E
- Country: Germany
- State: Saxony-Anhalt
- District: Mansfeld-Südharz

Government
  - Mayor (2024–31): Torsten Schweiger (CDU)

Area
  - Total: 207.66 km^{2} (80.18 sq mi)
- Elevation: 154 m (505 ft)

Population (2025-12-31)
  - Total: 25,163
  - Density: 121.17/km^{2} (313.84/sq mi)
- Time zone: UTC+01:00 (CET)
  - Summer (DST): UTC+02:00 (CEST)
- Postal codes: 03464, 034656 (Großleinungen), 034658 (Breitenbach, Horla, Wolfsberg), 034775 (Wippra)
- Dialling codes: 03464
- Vehicle registration: MSH, EIL, HET, ML, SGH
- Website: www.sangerhausen.de

Sangerhausen (German pronunciation: [zaŋɐˈhaʊzn̩]) is a town in Saxony-Anhalt, central Germany, capital of the district of Mansfeld-Südharz. It is situated southeast of the Harz, approx. 35 kilometres (22 miles) east of Nordhausen, and 50 km (31 mi) west of Halle (Saale). About 26,000 people live in Sangerhausen (2020).

== History ==
Historical affiliations

Margraviate of Meissen 1249–1291
Margraviate of Brandenburg 1291–1372
Electorate of Saxony 1372–1806

Poland-Saxony 1697–1706, 1709–1763

Kingdom of Saxony 1806–1815
Kingdom of Prussia 1815–1871
German Empire 1871–1918
Weimar Republic 1918–1933
Nazi Germany 1933–1945
Allied-occupied Germany 1945–1949
East Germany 1949–1990
Federal Republic of Germany 1990–present

Sangerhausen is one of the oldest towns in the historical region of Saxony-Anhalt, being first mentioned in a document created between 780 and 802 in Fulda Abbey.

Sangerhausen is mentioned as the tithable place Sangerhus in Friesenfeld in the Hersfeld Tithe Register, created between 881 and 899.

It is mentioned in a document of 991 as appertaining to the estates of the emperor, as part of Memleben Abbey.

By marriage it passed to the landgrave of Thuringia, and after 1056 it formed for a while an independent country. Having been again part of Thuringia, it fell in 1249 to Meissen, and in 1291 to Brandenburg. In 1372 it passed to the Electorate of Saxony and formed a portion of that territory until 1815, when it became a part of the Prussian Province of Saxony.

=== Historical population ===
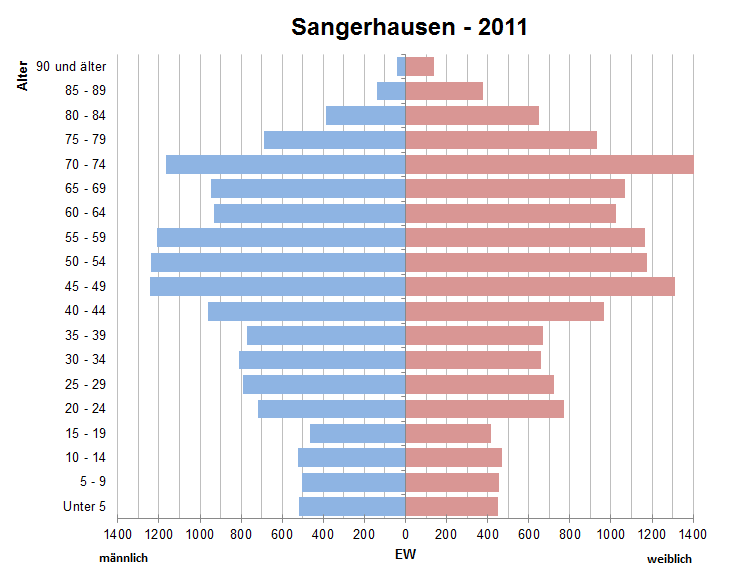
Population pyramid as of Census 2011)

Population development from 1824 to 2017 as in the displayed table

Year	Population
1824	4,419
1895	11,414
1946	16,220
1950	16,753
1960	23,778
1981	33,822
1984	33,466
1986	33,064
1995	29,734
1997	27,798
1998	26,917
1999	26,121
2000	25,399

Year	Population
2001	24,881
2002	24,337
2003	23,836
2004	23,435
2005	23,261
2006	30,382*
2009	30,063 (21,337)**
2011	29,240
2013	27,830
2015	27,752
2016	27,265
2017	26,798
2018	26,297

* After annexation of neighboring districts

** Population of Sangerhausen town in brackets

== Municipality ==
Map of the administrative divisions

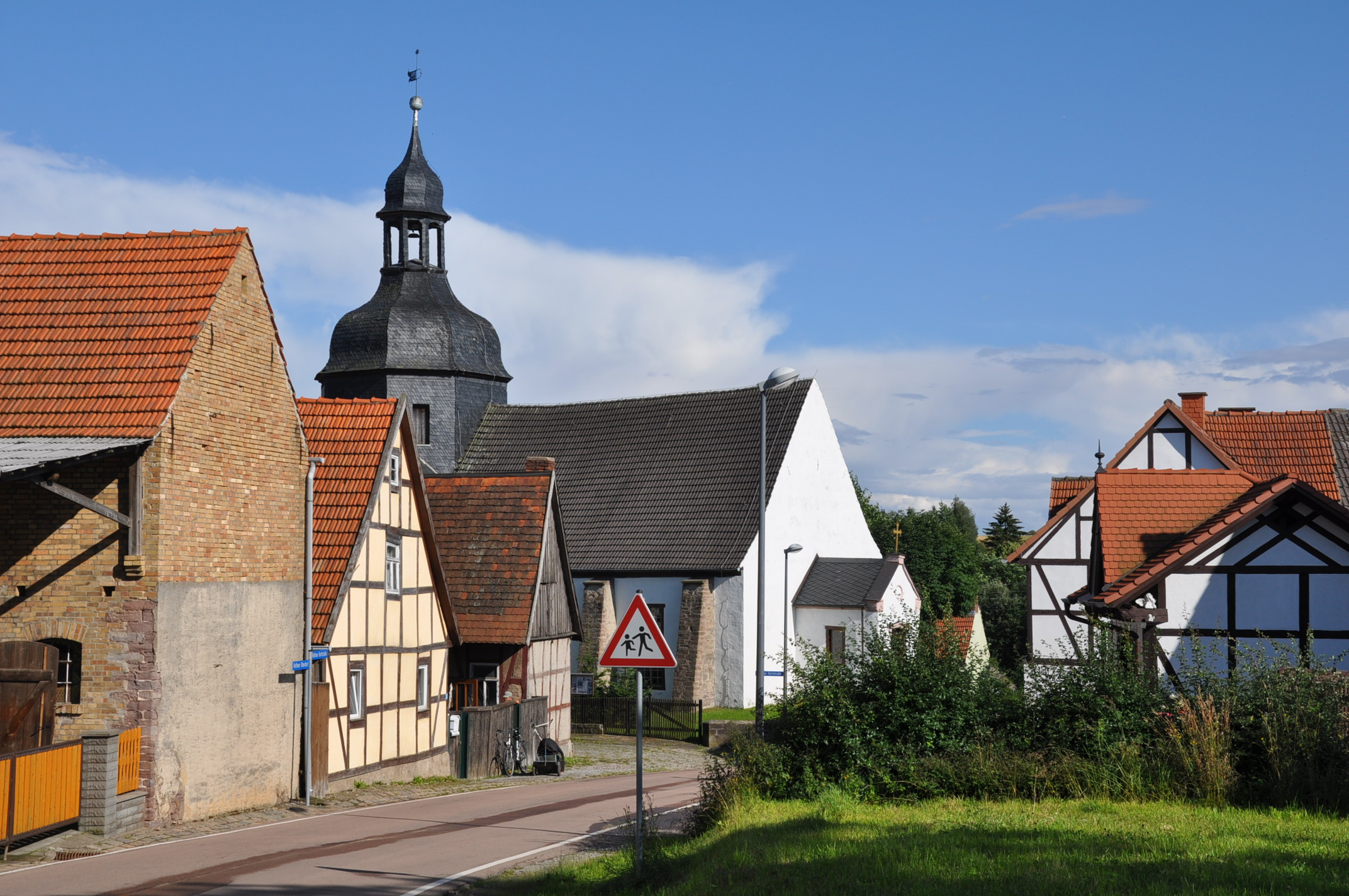
Village of Rotha

The municipality of Sangerhausen currently consists of 15 divisions, also called (in German) Ortschafte. These are:

- Breitenbach
- Gonna
- Grillenberg
- Großleinungen
- Horla
- Lengefeld
- Morungen
- Oberröblingen
- Obersdorf
- Riestedt
- Rotha
- Sangerhausen
- Wettelrode
- Wippra
- Wolfsberg

In 1994, the town of Sangerhausen, at that time still an independent municipality, became part of the so-called Verwaltungsgemeinschaft Sangerhausen, a municipal association consisting of Sangerhausen itself and the two villages/municipalities Edersleben and Oberröblingen. On 29 April 2000 Edersleben left for the Verwaltungsgemeinschaft Helme. On 1 January 2005 the municipalities Gonna, Grillenberg, Horla, Lengefeld, Morungen, Obersdorf, Pölsfeld, Rotha and Wettelrode joined the association from the Verwaltungsgemeinschaft Südharz which was dissolved. Six months later, on 3 July 2005 Pölsfeld left for the Verwaltungsgemeinschaft Allstedt-Kaltenborn.

On 1 October 2005 the Verwaltungsgemeinschaft Sangerhausen, consisting then of 10 municipalities was dissolved and turned into the single town/municipality Sangerhausen; which meant that the 9 villages were truly annexed. On the same date Breitenbach, Großleinungen and Wolfsberg also joined, coming from the municipal association Roßla-Südharz. On 1 December 2005 Riestedt followed, coming from the Verwaltungsgemeinschaft Allstedt-Kaltenborn. Finally, Wippra was incorporated on 1 January 2008, coming from the Verwaltungsgemeinschaft Wipper-Eine.

== Main sights ==
- Old Town Hall, erected in 1431–1437 after a previous edifice burned down in 1358
- Church of St. Mary (Marienkirche), built in 1350 in Gothic style
- Church of St. James (Jakobikirche, 1457–1542), a late Gothic hall edifice with a nave and three aisles. It has a 61 m-high, slightly tilting bell tower with a Baroque cover. The interior has a rich decoration painted by Georg Bottschild in 1665, while the choir stalls and the high altar are from an Augustinian monastery closed in 1539. It also houses numerous tombs and effigies. Johann Sebastian Bach applied here in 1702 for the post of organist, but the job went to Johann Augustin Kobelius.
- Church of St. Ulrich (Ulrichkirche), one of the most interesting Romanesque edifices in Germany. It is a basilica built in 1116-1123, with a bell tower added in the 15th century. It has a nave and two aisles with groin vault. The eastern part has five apses.
- The Altes Schloss ("Old Castle"), built by the lords of Meissen. Only a tower remains. The New Palace or Neues Schloss was built by Kaspar Tryller, minister of Finances of the Electorate of Saxony, from 1612 to 1622. It is a Renaissance style, and now houses the county court.

== Transport ==
Sangerhausen station lies on the Halle–Hann. Münden railway and the Sangerhausen–Erfurt railway.

== Twin towns – sister cities ==
Sangerhausen is twinned with:

- Baunatal, Germany
- Trnava, Slovakia
- Zabrze, Poland

== Notable people ==
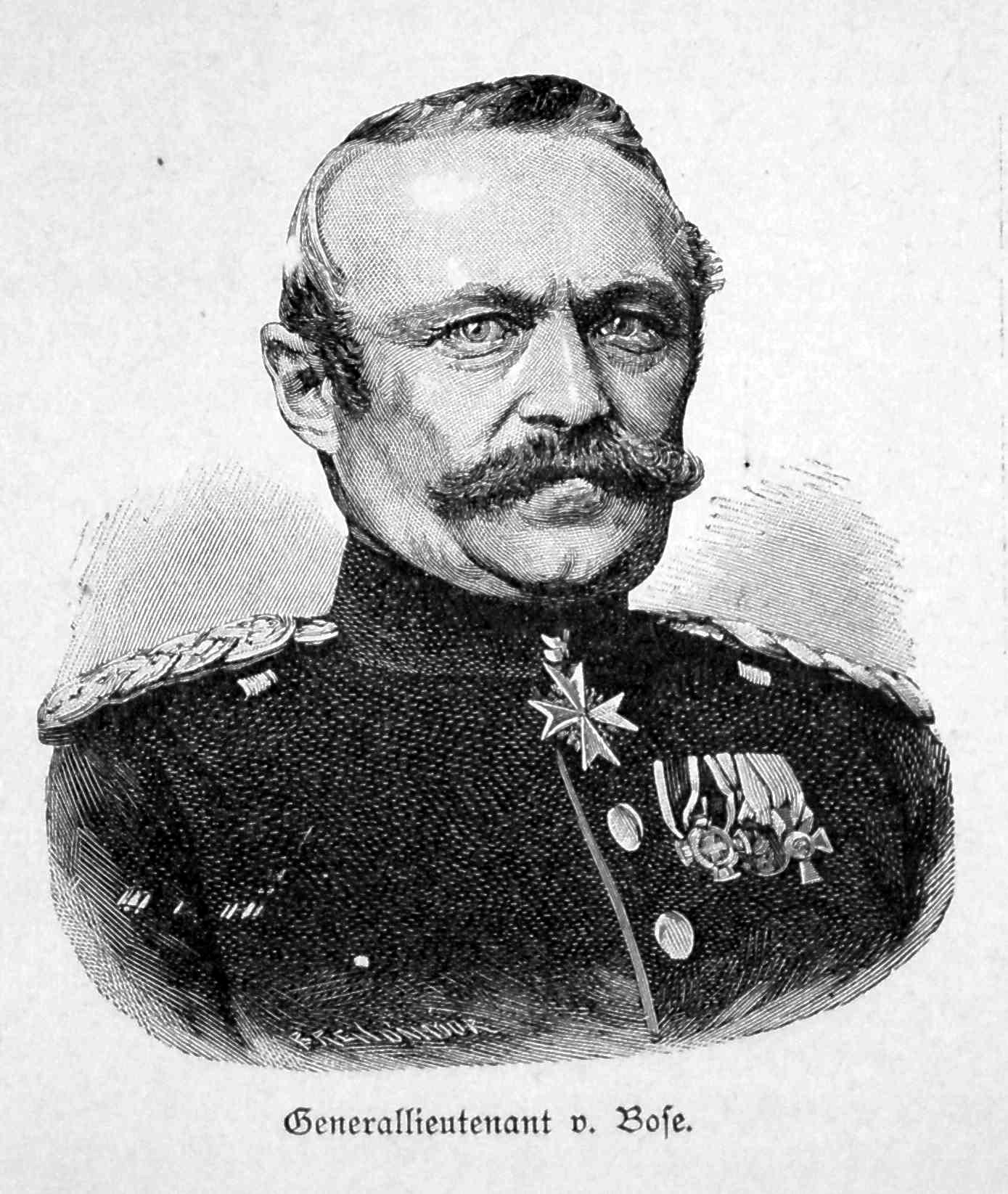
Julius von Bose

- Andreas Knebel (born 1960), athlete
- Thomas Liese (born 1968), cyclist
- Max Ludwig (1871–1961), general
- Manfred Möck (born 1959), actor
- Norbert Nachtweih (born 1957), footballer
- Werner Rothmaler (1908–1962), botanist and professor at the University of Greifswald
- Einar Schleef (1944–2001), director and writer
- Werner Stock (1903–1972), actor
- Annekatrin Thiele (born 1984), rower
- Julius von Bose (1809–1894), Prussian general of the infantry
