= Ortschaft =

Human settlement in German-speaking countries

Ortschaft (plural Ortschaften; English: locality) is a term in German-speaking countries for a human settlement—a named, inhabited, geographically delimitable populated area. In some countries it also has a specific administrative or postal meaning, used for subdivisions of municipalities or for the units that structure postal addresses.

== Germany ==
In several states of Germany, Ortschaft is used for administrative subdivisions of municipalities. These have been defined in the Gemeindeordnung or Kommunalverfassung of the respective federal state. This is the case in the states of Baden-Württemberg, Lower Saxony, North Rhine-Westphalia, Saxony, Saxony-Anhalt and Thuringia. The Ortschaften often, but not always, coincide with former municipalities that were incorporated into another municipality. The inhabitants of an Ortschaft are represented by an elected Ortschaftsrat (local council) and/or an Ortsvorsteher (local representative).

== Switzerland ==
In Switzerland, Ortschaft (French: localité; Italian: località) has a specific postal and cadastral meaning. A locality is an inhabited, geographically delimitable, contiguous settlement area with its own name and its own postal code (a "postal locality"), and may comprise one or more places (Orte or Ortsteile).

Localities are defined independently of the municipalities, although their boundaries partly coincide. They are artificially created administrative areas that together cover the whole of Swiss territory without overlap, established in order to form building addresses that are unique across the country. A municipality may contain several localities or postal codes, and conversely a locality or postal code may extend across several municipalities, sometimes even across a cantonal boundary.

The cantons are responsible, after consulting the municipalities and Swiss Post, for determining locality names and their associated perimeters, while Swiss Post assigns the postal codes. The Federal Office of Topography (swisstopo) maintains and publishes the official register of localities (amtliches Ortschaftenverzeichnis; French: répertoire officiel des localités), a dataset of the names, postal codes, and perimeters of all localities in Switzerland and the Principality of Liechtenstein, updated monthly. There are about 4,100 localities, averaging roughly 1.5 per municipality.

== Austria ==
The term is also used in Austria, for villages and/or settlements within a municipality.
