= Ruth, Nevada =

- CDP
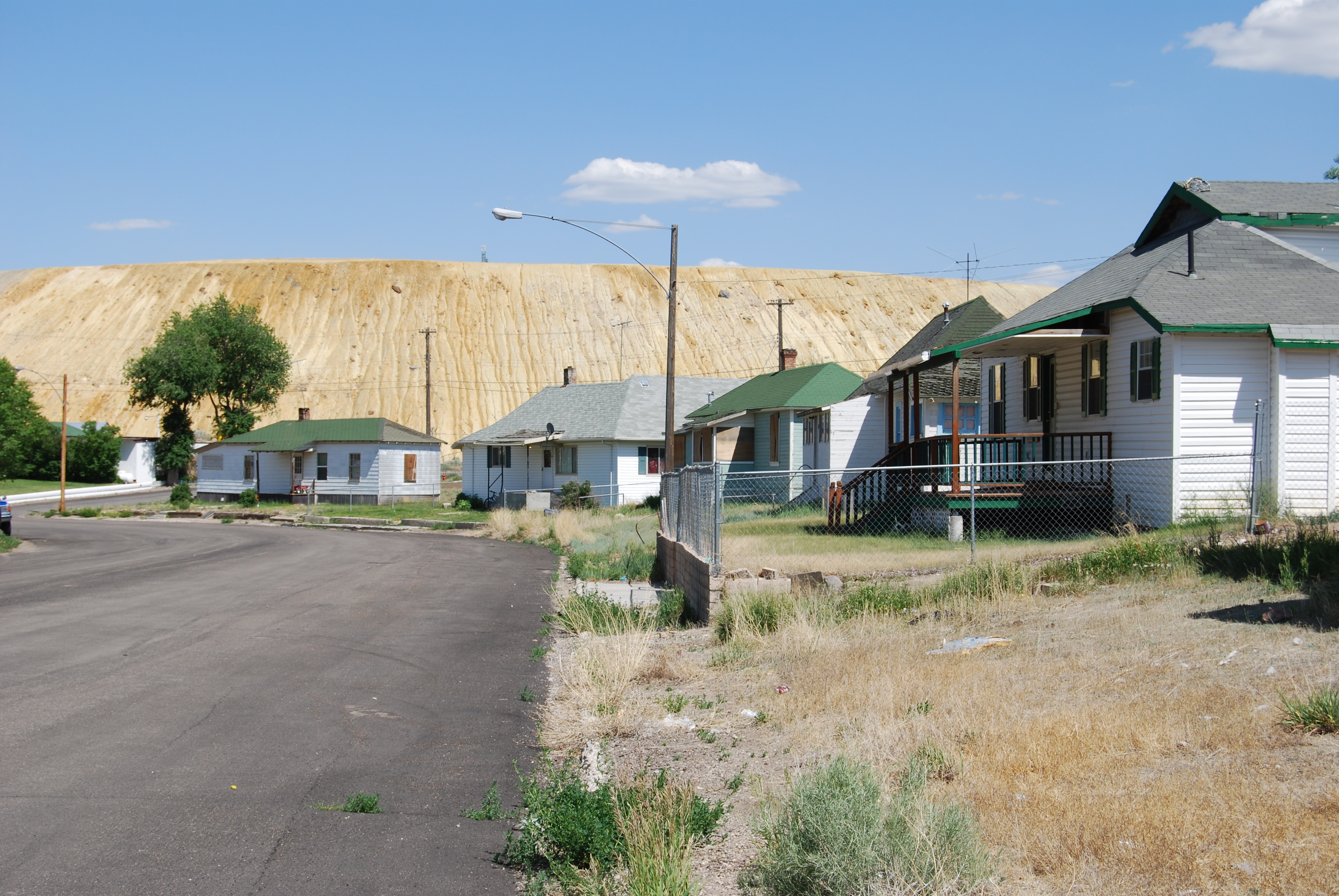
- Street Scene in Ruth, Nevada

- Location within the state of Nevada Ruth (the United States)
- Coordinates: 39°16′45″N 114°59′24″W
- Country: United States
- State: Nevada
- County: White Pine

Area
  - Total: 0.35 sq mi (0.90 km^{2})
  - Land: 0.35 sq mi (0.90 km^{2})
  - Water: 0 sq mi (0.00 km^{2})
- Elevation: 6,870 ft (2,090 m)

Population (2020)
  - Total: 371
  - Density: 1,072.9/sq mi (414.24/km^{2})
- Time zone: UTC-8 (Pacific (PST))
  - Summer (DST): UTC-7 (PDT)
- ZIP code: 89319
- FIPS code: 32-63800
- GNIS feature ID: 2629979

Ruth is a census-designated place (CDP) in White Pine County, Nevada, United States. Founded in 1903, it had a population of 371 at the 2020 census.

Ruth was built as a company town for the adjacent Robinson Mine, a large open-pit copper mine, which is still in operation as of 2022.

== Demographics ==
Historical population
Census	Pop.	Note	%±
2020	371		—
U.S. Decennial Census

== History ==
Ruth began as a settlement for workers of the White Pine Copper Company in 1903. It derived its name from the Ruth mining claim which was named for Ruth McDonald, daughter of the original owner of the mining claim.

With the opening Nevada Northern Railway in the year 1906 copper production began to boom.

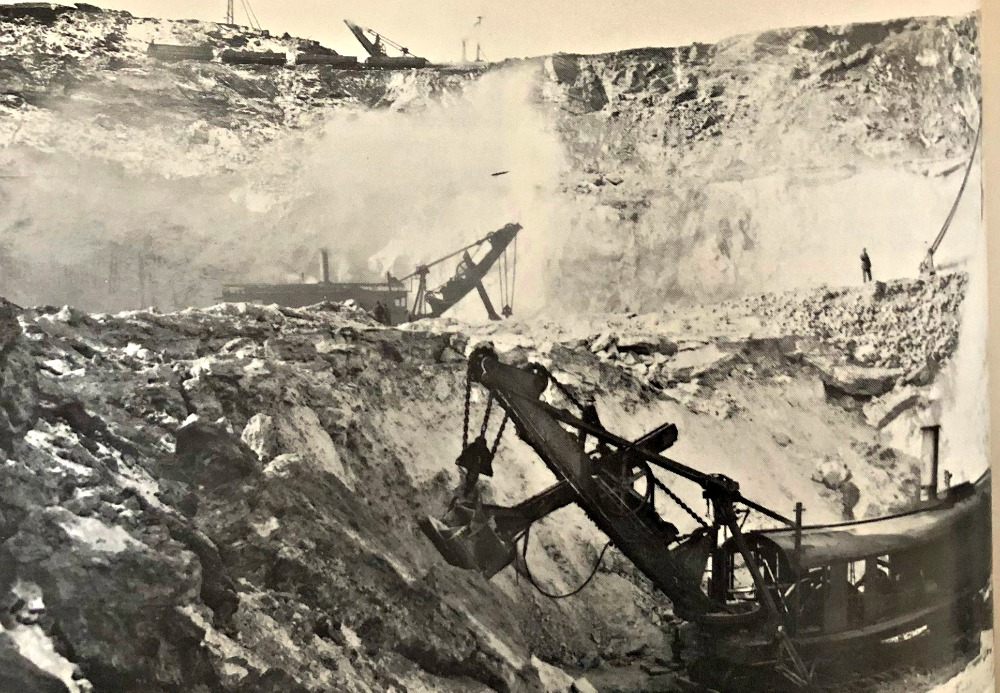
Three-ton steam shovel, Ruth, 1910

In 1905, Daniel C. Jackling "evaluated a low-grade copper prospect", which he turned into "an impressive open-pit and satellite cave (the Veteran Mine)." Jackling went on to become president of the Nevada Consolidated Copper Company.

By 1910 the settlement was already established a small distance from the first site. Ruth was a company town for the Nevada Consolidated Copper Company: the houses belonged to the mine and the city and were administered by them. Saloons and bordellos were not permitted in the company town but were plentiful in the neighboring community of Riepetown.

A mine explosion in Ruth on July 12, 1912, killed ten people. In 1929 there was another explosion set off by dynamite blasts. 2 men were killed with a third injured. One of the killed men was Giovanni Simonetta from Cortale, Italy.

In 1919 Ruth was the site of a labor dispute when 150 copper miners walked out demanding higher wages. Although some claimed the strike was instigated by the Industrial Workers of the World the leaders were actually from the Western Federation of Miners.

At the beginning of the Great Depression, Ruth had almost 2,300 inhabitants.

Nevada Consolidated Copper Co. was taken over by Kennecott Copper Corporation in 1933.

Ruth ceased being a company town in 1955 when the houses were sold to the John W. Galbreath Company. Occupants were given the opportunity to purchase the homes they had been renting. Around this time the community was moved two miles north to make way for expansion of the Deep Ruth mine.

In 1978 Kennecott closed the mines in Ruth, which went into decline. The elementary school closed in 1986.

BHP reopened the mine in 1996. From 1996 to 1999, the BHP Nevada Railroad was based here. The mine closed again in 1999.

Quadra FNX Mining reopened the Robinson Mine in 2004, and it is still in full production as of 2022.

The Nevada Northern Railway Museum maintains some track in the area.

Ruth was featured in the fourth season of the Netflix original series Stranger Things as the location of the NINA project, which is housed in a converted missile silo.

Ruth is the inspiration for the Stephen King novel Desperation.

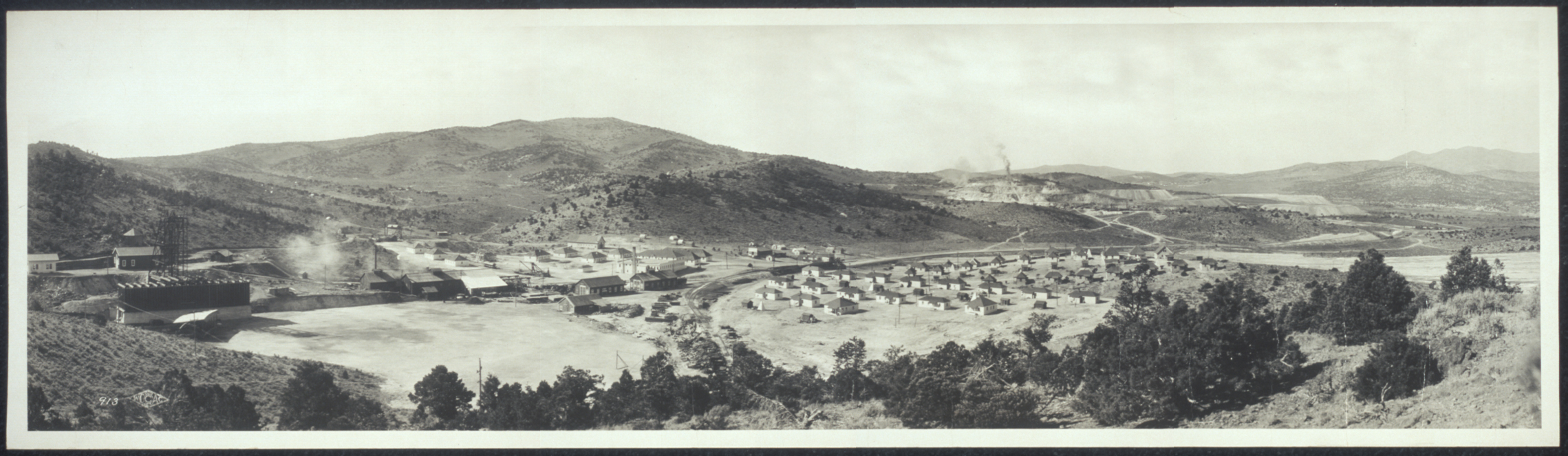
A panorama of Ruth, circa 1912

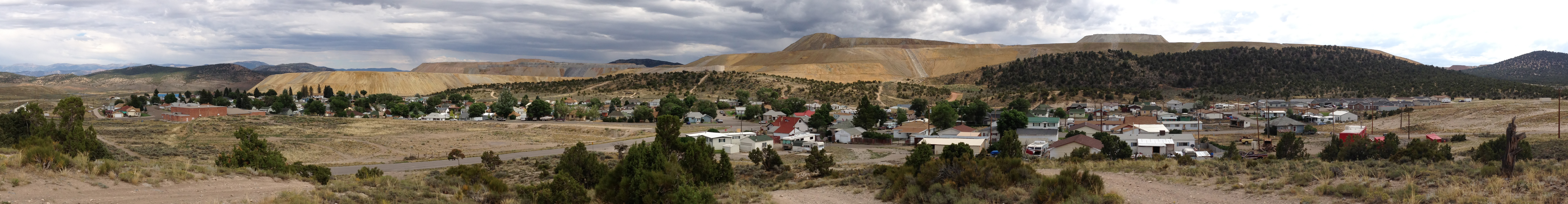
A panorama of Ruth in 2014

== Notable people ==
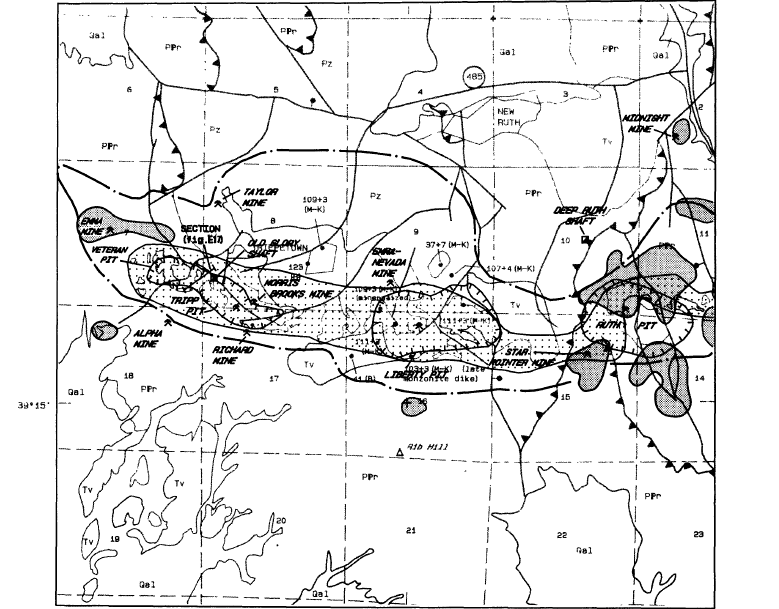
Geologic structure map showing local mining operations with Ruth in the top center and Rib Hill in the bottom center. Ruth Pit is to the right and the Veteran Pit is to the left. The hatched area indicates traces of copper while the shaded area indicates traces of gold.

- Charles H. Russell, 20th governor of Nevada, worked briefly in Ruth ca. 1927.
- Former U.S. Congresswoman Helen Delich Bentley, who represented the state of Maryland, was born in Ruth.

== Climate ==
Ruth experiences a semi-arid climate (Bsk) with hot summers and cold winters, typical of most small towns in the Great Basin. Due to Ruth's substantial elevation and aridity, the diurnal temperature variation is large. Nights are cool, even in the summer, and frosts can occur any time of the year, although rare in summer months. Daytime highs in the winter tend to be a few degrees above freezing, but nights can be bitterly cold.

Climate data for Ruth, Nevada, 1991–2020 normals, 1958-2020 extremes: 6858ft (2090m)
Month	Jan	Feb	Mar	Apr	May	Jun	Jul	Aug	Sep	Oct	Nov	Dec	Year
Record high °F (°C)	62 (17)	68 (20)	75 (24)	80 (27)	88 (31)	94 (34)	100 (38)	96 (36)	95 (35)	86 (30)	80 (27)	64 (18)	100 (38)
Mean maximum °F (°C)	53 (12)	54 (12)	62 (17)	70 (21)	79 (26)	87 (31)	92 (33)	89 (32)	85 (29)	76 (24)	65 (18)	53 (12)	92 (33)
Mean daily maximum °F (°C)	37.7 (3.2)	40.2 (4.6)	47.1 (8.4)	54.0 (12.2)	64.3 (17.9)	75.7 (24.3)	83.9 (28.8)	82.3 (27.9)	74.6 (23.7)	61.4 (16.3)	47.0 (8.3)	37.4 (3.0)	58.8 (14.9)
Daily mean °F (°C)	23.4 (−4.8)	25.8 (−3.4)	32.9 (0.5)	39.2 (4.0)	48.3 (9.1)	57.9 (14.4)	65.6 (18.7)	63.9 (17.7)	55.1 (12.8)	43.0 (6.1)	31.5 (−0.3)	22.4 (−5.3)	42.4 (5.8)
Mean daily minimum °F (°C)	9.0 (−12.8)	11.5 (−11.4)	18.7 (−7.4)	24.3 (−4.3)	32.3 (0.2)	40.1 (4.5)	47.3 (8.5)	45.6 (7.6)	35.6 (2.0)	24.6 (−4.1)	15.9 (−8.9)	7.4 (−13.7)	26.0 (−3.3)
Mean minimum °F (°C)	−15 (−26)	−10 (−23)	−1 (−18)	10 (−12)	18 (−8)	27 (−3)	35 (2)	33 (1)	22 (−6)	11 (−12)	−3 (−19)	−13 (−25)	−19 (−28)
Record low °F (°C)	−30 (−34)	−31 (−35)	−19 (−28)	−12 (−24)	5 (−15)	18 (−8)	18 (−8)	22 (−6)	12 (−11)	−6 (−21)	−22 (−30)	−34 (−37)	−34 (−37)
Average precipitation inches (mm)	0.97 (25)	1.09 (28)	1.13 (29)	1.34 (34)	1.51 (38)	0.85 (22)	1.02 (26)	0.73 (19)	1.02 (26)	1.11 (28)	0.89 (23)	0.92 (23)	12.58 (321)
Average snowfall inches (cm)	13.10 (33.3)	12.40 (31.5)	10.10 (25.7)	5.50 (14.0)	1.30 (3.3)	0.00 (0.00)	0.00 (0.00)	0.00 (0.00)	0.30 (0.76)	1.80 (4.6)	6.10 (15.5)	13.30 (33.8)	63.9 (162.46)
Source 1: NOAA
Source 2: XMACIS2 (records)

Climate data for Moorman Ranch - Ruth 16WNW, Nevada, 1991–2020 normals: 6539ft (1993m)
Month	Jan	Feb	Mar	Apr	May	Jun	Jul	Aug	Sep	Oct	Nov	Dec	Year
Record high °F (°C)	62 (17)	69 (21)	76 (24)	81 (27)	90 (32)	98 (37)	100 (38)	97 (36)	93 (34)	87 (31)	74 (23)	65 (18)	100 (38)
Mean maximum °F (°C)	52 (11)	54 (12)	65 (18)	73 (23)	82 (28)	91 (33)	95 (35)	92 (33)	87 (31)	77 (25)	67 (19)	54 (12)	96 (36)
Mean daily maximum °F (°C)	38.7 (3.7)	41.2 (5.1)	48.7 (9.3)	54.8 (12.7)	65.2 (18.4)	76.6 (24.8)	85.5 (29.7)	83.8 (28.8)	75.4 (24.1)	62.2 (16.8)	48.0 (8.9)	37.9 (3.3)	59.8 (15.5)
Daily mean °F (°C)	25.4 (−3.7)	27.3 (−2.6)	34.5 (1.4)	39.8 (4.3)	48.3 (9.1)	57.8 (14.3)	66.5 (19.2)	64.6 (18.1)	56.1 (13.4)	44.6 (7.0)	32.8 (0.4)	24.0 (−4.4)	43.5 (6.4)
Mean daily minimum °F (°C)	12.1 (−11.1)	13.5 (−10.3)	20.3 (−6.5)	24.9 (−3.9)	31.4 (−0.3)	39.0 (3.9)	47.4 (8.6)	45.5 (7.5)	36.8 (2.7)	27.0 (−2.8)	17.7 (−7.9)	10.1 (−12.2)	27.1 (−2.7)
Mean minimum °F (°C)	−10 (−23)	−4 (−20)	4 (−16)	14 (−10)	22 (−6)	29 (−2)	40 (4)	38 (3)	27 (−3)	15 (−9)	2 (−17)	−9 (−23)	−13 (−25)
Record low °F (°C)	−22 (−30)	−18 (−28)	−8 (−22)	8 (−13)	13 (−11)	23 (−5)	34 (1)	34 (1)	21 (−6)	−4 (−20)	−16 (−27)	−20 (−29)	−22 (−30)
Average precipitation inches (mm)	0.79 (20)	0.77 (20)	0.90 (23)	1.07 (27)	1.23 (31)	0.46 (12)	0.68 (17)	0.79 (20)	0.81 (21)	0.72 (18)	0.55 (14)	0.69 (18)	9.46 (241)
Average snowfall inches (cm)	7.50 (19.1)	7.80 (19.8)	8.00 (20.3)	4.40 (11.2)	1.20 (3.0)	0.00 (0.00)	0.00 (0.00)	0.00 (0.00)	0.20 (0.51)	0.40 (1.0)	4.40 (11.2)	10.30 (26.2)	44.2 (112.31)
Source 1: NOAA
Source 2: XMACIS2 (records)
