= BHP Nevada Railroad =

Defunct railroad in Nevada, United States

Overview
- Headquarters: Ruth, Nevada
- Reporting mark: BHP
- Locale: Northern Nevada Shafter – Ely
- Dates of operation: January 1996–July 9, 1999

Technical
- Track gauge: 4 ft 8 1/2 in (1,435 mm) standard gauge

The BHP Nevada Railroad (reporting mark BHP) was a shortline railroad that operated in Nevada from 1996 to 1999. BHP acquired the line from Nevada Northern Railway. Constructed by Utah Construction Company in 1908, the railroad hauled copper ore concentrate from BHP's concentrator at Riepetown to Shafter, Nevada. At Shafter the railroad interchanged with the Union Pacific and the ore continued to BHP's smelter at San Manuel, Arizona. BHP is an Australian-based company that took over Magma Copper, the owner of the Robinson Mine at Ruth, Nevada, in January 1996. The line ran south from a connection with the Union Pacific at Shafter to Ely.

== Locomotives ==
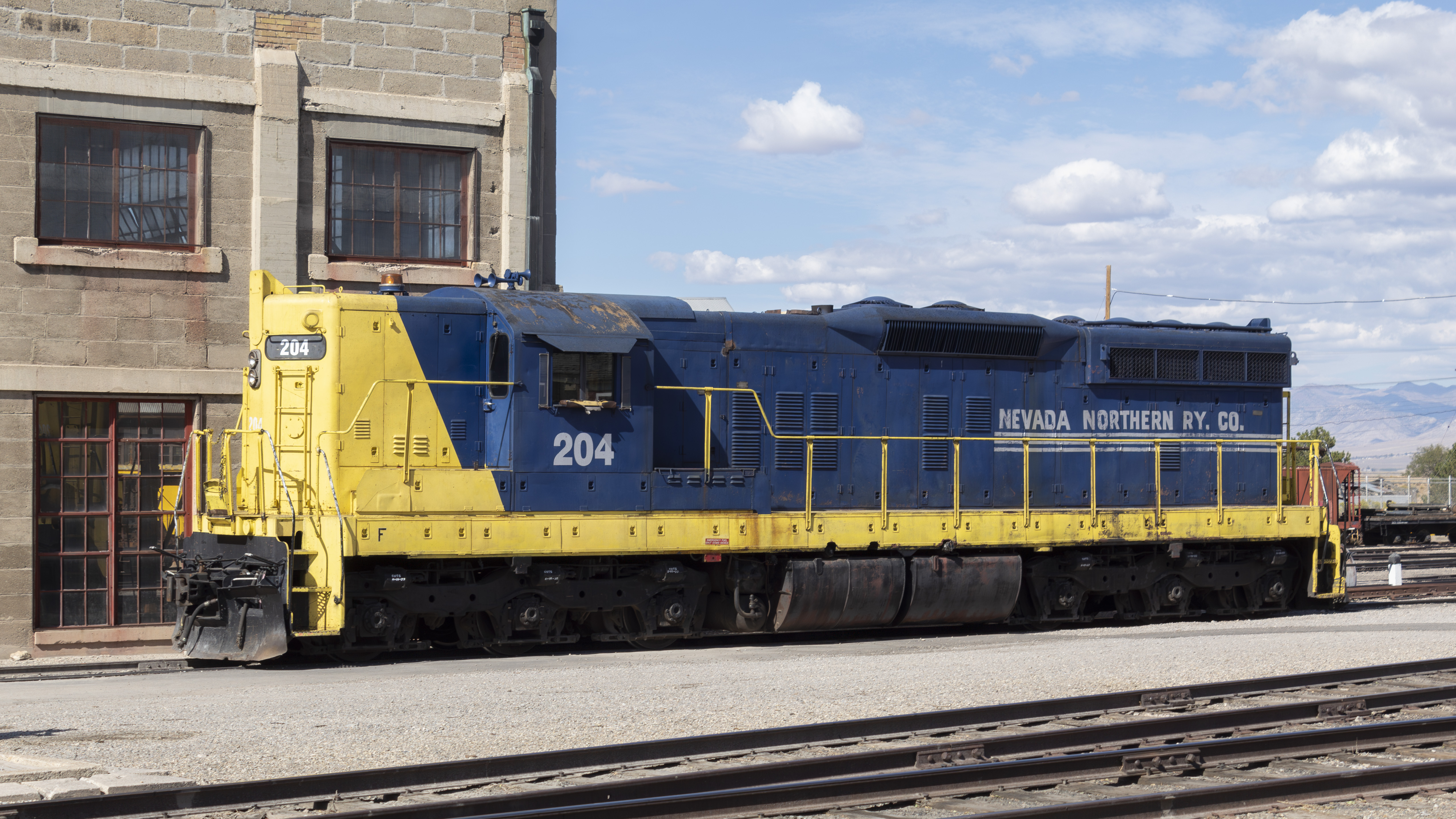
Former BHP Nevada Railroad 204, preserved at the Nevada Northern Railway Museum prior to 2025 repaint.

The BHP Nevada Railroad used five former Southern Pacific Railroad EMD SD9 locomotives built between 1954 and 1956 to operate over the line. They were numbered #201 – 205. For switching and local operations the railroad used two GE 70-ton switchers from the Santa Maria Valley Railroad. BHP also had one ALCO RS-3. The switchers were also built in the 1950s and numbered #12 and #13.

== Nevada Northern Railway Museum ==
BHP ended up turning over its locomotives and rolling stock to the Nevada Northern Railway Museum as part of a settlement over their track lease agreement. The Nevada Northern would afterwards sell three of the former BHP locomotives to the Colorado Kansas & Pacific Railroad, would scrap one locomotive (former BHP #201) in the 2000's, and retained the remaining locomotives for use by the museum in various capacities.

A small portion of the BHP Nevada Railroad was operated over the Nevada Northern Railway Museum tracks with trackage rights between East Ely and Ruth. The line was abandoned in 1999 when copper mining was discontinued, however in 2004 the mines were reopened, and the copper concentrate was hauled by road. The disused line between Ely and Cobre was acquired by the city of Ely in 2006.

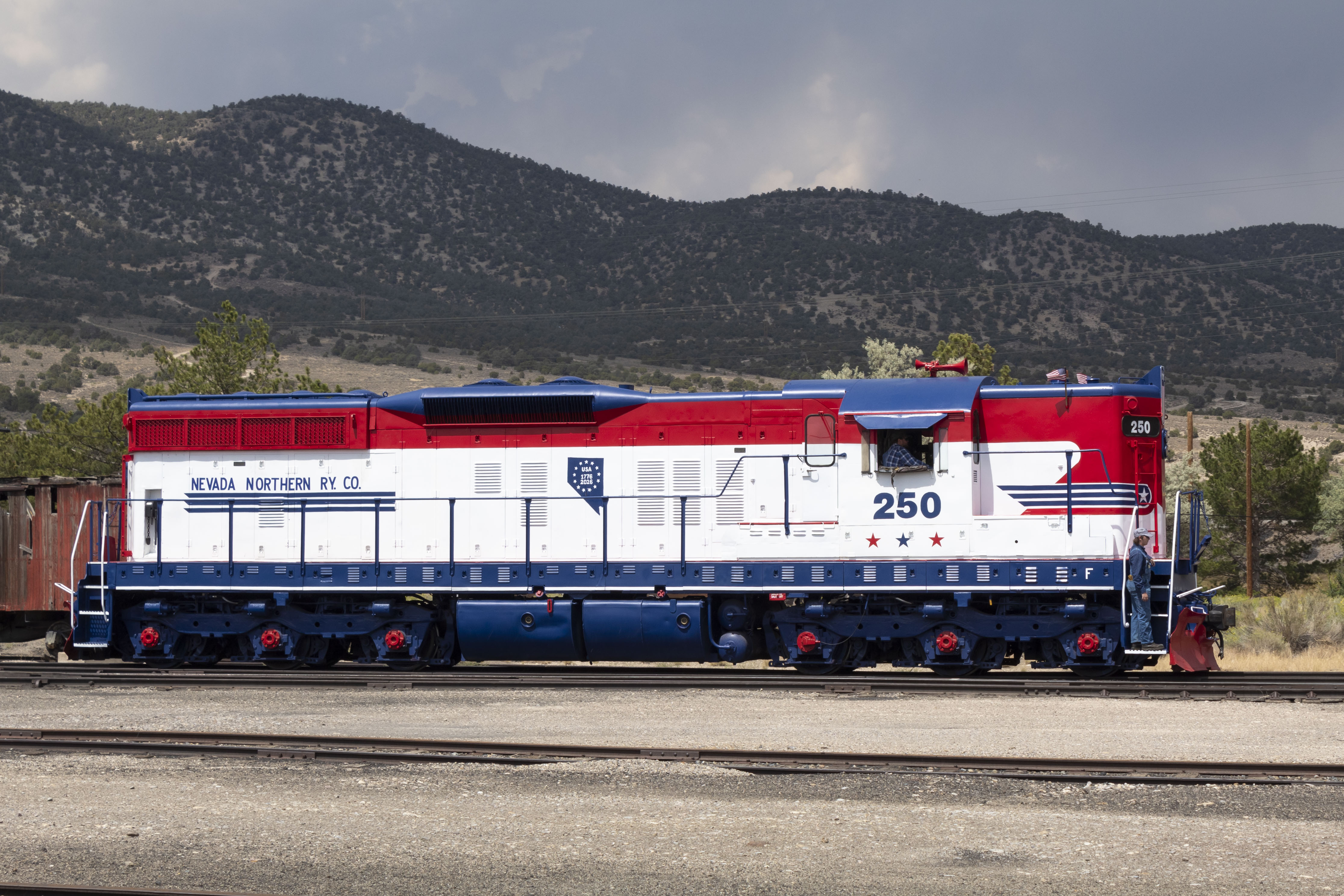
Nevada Northern 250, former BHP Nevada 204; painted for the upcoming US Semiquincentennial.

Former BHP Nevada #204 was part of a contest by the Nevada Northern Railway Museum to design a locomotive to celebrate the United States Semiquincentennial. BHP Nevada #204 was renumbered as #250 and repainted in the winning design in 2025 in preparation for the 2026 celebrations.

== Route ==
Stations, listed from north to south:

- Shafter, Nevada (connection with the Union Pacific Railroad, former Western Pacific)
- Decoy
- Dolly Varden
- Mizpah
- Currie
- Goshute
- Greens
- Cherry Creek
- Schellbourne (Ray)
- Requa (Raiff)
- Warm Springs
- Steptoe
- Glenn
- McGill Junction
- J&M Spur
- Hiline Junction (Hi Line Junction)
- Mosier
- East Ely
- Ore Yard
- Calumet
- Tunnel 1
- Lane
- Keystone
- Lone Tree Road
- Ruth
- Sunshine
- Tripp Pit
- Riepetown

== See also ==
- List of defunct Nevada railroads
- White Knob Copper Electric Railway: a copper ore railway in Idaho
- Mansfeld Mining Railway: a copper ore railway in Germany
- Otavi Mining and Railway Company: a copper ore railway in Namibia

== Other sources ==
- Robertson, Donald B. (1986). Encyclopedia of Western Railroad History – The Desert States. Caldwell, ID: The Caxton Printers, Ltd. ISBN 0-87004-305-6.
- Walker, Mike (1997). Steam Powered Video's Comprehensive Railroad Atlas of North America - California and Nevada - Post Merger Ed. Kent, United Kingdom: Steam Powered Publishing. ISBN 1-874745-08-0.
- "Nevada Northern & Railroads of White Pine County". BHP Nevada Railroad History. Archived from the original on March 13, 2005.
- "Nevada Northern & Railroads of White Pine County". BHP Nevada Railroad Locomotive Roster. Archived from the original on April 11, 2005.
