= Mansfeld Land =

Region of Saxony-Anhalt

Mansfeld Land (German: Mansfelder Land) is a region in the southwestern corner of the German state of Saxony-Anhalt. The region derives its name from the counts of Mansfeld, who ruled this region for about 1,000 years.

== Geography ==
In the west and northwest, Mansfeld Land covered the eastern foothills of the Harz Mountains and is bounded in the east by the River Saale. To the north and south the territories of the two former county towns of Eisleben and Hettstedt form the boundary, whilst the territories of Sangerhausen and the town of Mansfeld form the border in the southwest to west.

Until the Second World War, Mansfeld Land was made up of the counties of Mansfelder Gebirgskreis (roughly northwest of a line from Annarode via Siersleben to Gerbstedt) and Mansfelder Seekreis (villages southeast of the line).

After the foundation of East Germany, these 2 counties were disbanded and transferred to the counties of Hettstedt and Eisleben, small areas of Mansfeld Land in the west went to Sangerhausen and in the south to Saalkreis and Querfurt.

Since the county reform of 2007, Mansfeld Land – after several years as the independent county of Mansfelder Land – has belonged to the county of Mansfeld-Südharz.

The extent of Mansfeld Land described above is roughly identical with the former County of Mansfeld.

== Transport links ==
- Motorway: A 38 Göttingen/Kassel – Eisleben – Halle/Leipzig
- Federal highways:
  - B 80 Weserbergland – Nordhausen – Halle
  - B 180 Aschersleben – Hettstedt – Zeitz
  - B 86 Hettstedt – Mansfeld – Sangerhausen
  - B 242 Clausthal-Zellerfeld – Braunlage – Mansfeld
- Railway:
  - Magdeburg – Hettstedt – Erfurt
  - Halle/Saale – Eisleben – Kassel

== Economy ==
Located not far from the Halle-Leipzig industrial region and the heavily industrial province of Halle, Mansfeld Land was one of the most important industrial conurbations in East Germany. Copper mining and the smelting of copper and its roughly 80 accessory metals played a major role. All copper mining, processing and manufacturing firms in the whole of East Germany were operated under the umbrella of the Mansfeld combine, Wilhelm Pieck, which also ran the Mansfeld Mining Railway. Prior to that it was the Mansfeld Company for Mining and Smelting (Mansfeld AG für Bergbau und Hüttenbetrieb).

The closure of mines and smelteries that had been working for almost eight hundred years resulted in an abrupt change to this monostructured economic area whose problems were exacerbated by the political changes of 1989/90. And newly created business parks and the remediation of contaminated sites did not bring the expected economic recovery.

== Tourism ==
The region has the right environment for recreational and cultural tourism around the lake of Süßer See south of Eisleben and in the Harz Foreland and the Luther memorial sites in the Lutheran towns of Eisleben and Mansfeld.

Since 1946 the town of Eisleben has had the official "nickname" of the Luther town (Lutherstadt). That takes into account the fact that Martin Luther was born here shortly before his parents moved the few kilometres to Mansfeld. Coincidentally, Luther died in his native town, where he was staying to mediate a dispute between the counts of Mansfeld (one branch of whom maintained a town castle in Eisleben).

Tourist attractions include the houses where the Reformer was born and died.

The town of Mansfeld was - as regards Luther - always rather overshadowed by the larger Eisleben; after the Wende Mansfeld was allowed to bear the official name: "Mansfeld-Lutherstadt".

Today, on the remaining stretch of railway line from Klostermansfeld to Hettstadt via Siersleben, trains of the old Mansfeld Mining Railway recall formerly busy operations on this narrow gauge industrial railway that linked all the shafts, numerous smelteries and other premises of the Mansfeld combine. In addition to its very wide-ranging goods traffic, the mining railway also ran passenger services - and primarily commuter services for the workers.

== Literature ==
- Britta Schulze-Thulin: Mansfelder Land und Unteres Saaletal. Wanderführer für Mitteldeutschland, Vol. 3. Mitteldeutscher Verlag, Halle (Saale), 2008, ISBN 9783898125475
- Mansfelder Land. Edition no. 1 Akademie-Verlag Berlin, Berlin 1982 (Werte unserer Heimat. Vol. 38).
- Hier der Harz und dort die Saale -Das Mansfelder Land. Multimedialer Streifzug durch die Heimat Martin Luthers. Multimedia-CD-ROM. Schneemann, Berlin o.J., ISBN 3-00-009782-1
- Renate Seidel: Die Grafen von Mansfeld - Geschichte und Geschichten eines deutschen Adelsgeschlechts. Fouquè Literaturverlag, Frankfurt a.M. 1998, ISBN 3-8267-4230-3
