= Nevada Northern Railway =

20th century U.S. state railroad

Overview
- Headquarters: Ely, Nevada
- Reporting mark: NN
- Locale: Nevada
- Dates of operation: 1905–1983

Technical
- Track gauge: 4 ft 8 1/2 in (1,435 mm) standard gauge
Route map
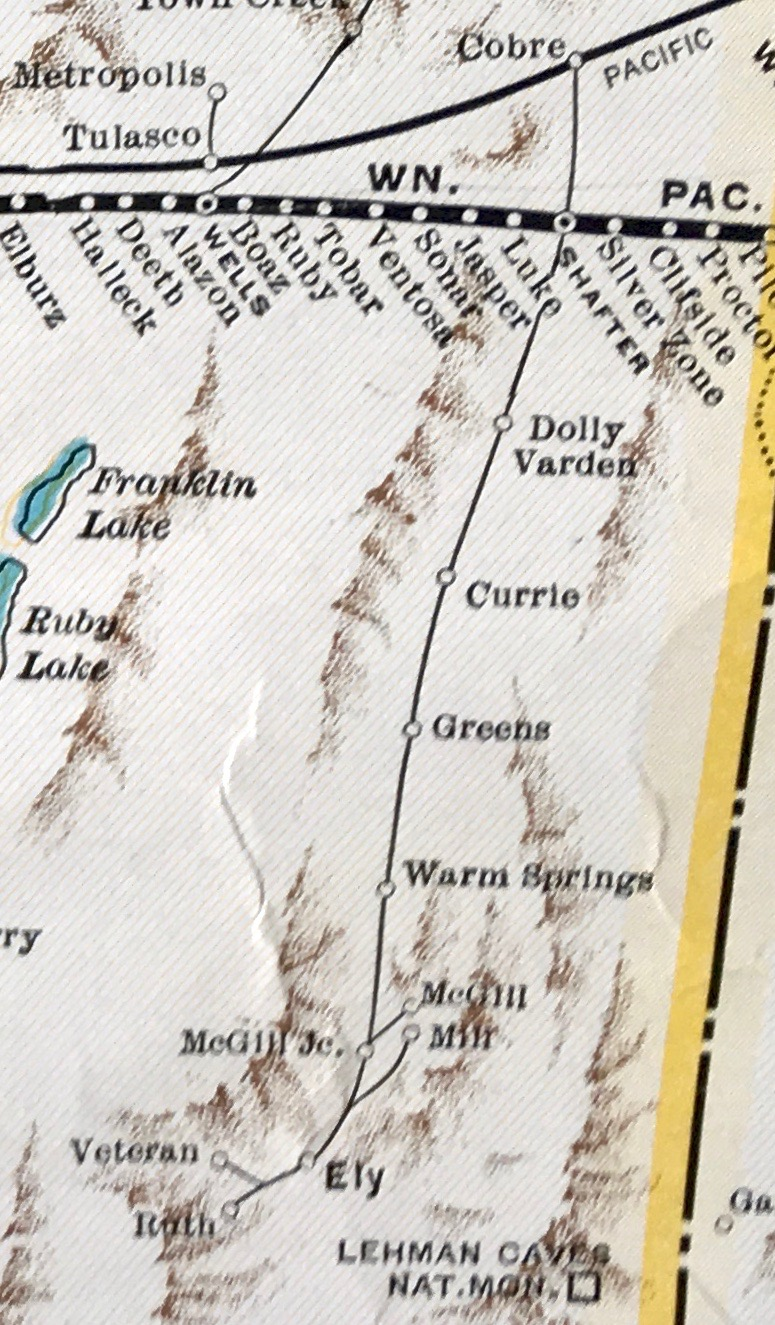

The Nevada Northern Railway (reporting mark NN) was a railroad in the U.S. state of Nevada, built primarily to reach a major copper producing area in White Pine County, Nevada. The railway, constructed in 1905–06, extended northward about 140 miles (230 km) from Ely to connections with the Western Pacific Railroad at Shafter and Southern Pacific Railroad at Cobre. In 1967 NN reported 40 million net ton-miles of revenue freight on 162 miles (261 km) of line.

== History ==
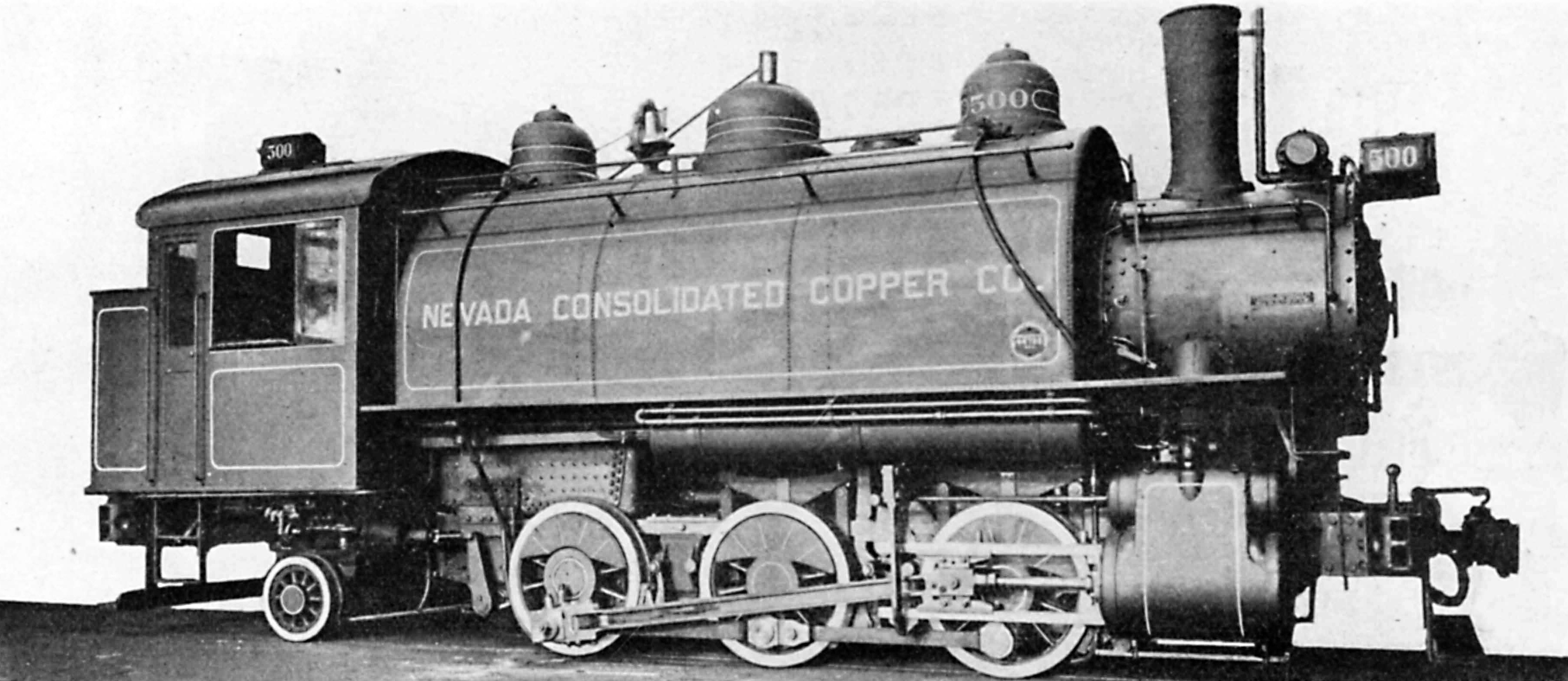
0-6-2 Saddle Tank Locomotive for Switching Service. Built by the Baldwin Locomotive Works for the Nevada Consolidated Copper Co.

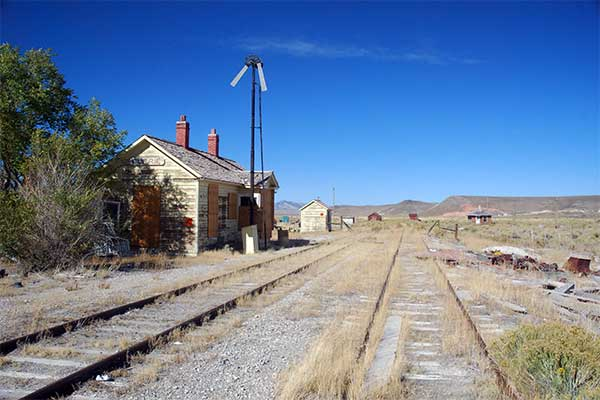
Abandoned Nevada Northern trackage and depot at Currie, Nevada, 2007

The Nevada Northern owes its beginnings to the discovery and development of large porphyry copper deposits near Ely early in the 20th century. Two of the region's largest mines (including the Robinson Mine) were purchased in 1902 by Mark Requa, president of the Eureka & Palisade Railroad in central Nevada.

Requa then organized the White Pine Copper Company to develop his new properties, and it soon became evident that rail access to the isolated region would be essential to fully exploit the potential of the mines. Originally plans called for extending the narrow-gauge Eureka and Palisade Railroad, which Requa was president of, effectively doubling the length of that line. Subsequent surveys indicated that a standard gauge railroad would be the most cost effective and that the most practical route for such a railroad was northward from Ely, connecting with the Southern Pacific somewhere in the vicinity of Wells.

The Ely-area copper properties were further merged in 1904, forming the Nevada Consolidated Copper Company, and the Nevada Northern Railway was incorporated on June 1, 1905, to build a line connecting the Nevada Consolidated mines and smelter to the national rail network. The task of building the new railroad was contracted to the Utah Construction Company, which began work on September 11, 1905. Construction began at Cobre, where the Nevada Northern connected with the Southern Pacific and proceeded southward. The line was finished a year later, its completion marked by a two-day celebration in Ely. The railroad's symbolic final spike—made of local copper—was driven by Requa in Ely on September 29, 1906, which was designated as Railroad Day. To celebrate the new railway, a ball was held inside the Northern building, which was still under construction at the time.

Additional Ely-area trackage was constructed in 1907–1908 to serve the local mining industry. This trackage, known as the "Ore Line," included a route bypassing Ely to the north and continuing west up Robinson Canyon to the copper mines at Ruth. East of Ely, the Ore Line project saw the construction of the "Hiline," a branch leading to Nevada Consolidated's new copper smelter and concentrator at McGill. The Ore Line immediately became the busiest segment of the Nevada Northern by far, hosting dozens of loaded and empty ore trains daily. The short spur to the concentrator was electrified, likely the only electric mainline railway in the state.

As a subsidiary of Nevada Consolidated, the primary purpose of the Nevada Northern throughout its history was the haulage of copper ores and products. Other freight traffic was also carried, and the railroad operated a daily passenger train between East Ely and Cobre until 1941. Local trains were also operated from Ely to Ruth and McGill for the benefit of mine employees and others until the 1930s, and special school trains carried students to White Pine High School in central Ely.

A series of corporate financial transactions in the 1920s and 1930s brought Nevada Consolidated under the control of the Kennecott Copper Corporation, and Nevada Consolidated was merged into Kennecott in 1942. The Nevada Northern thus became a Kennecott subsidiary.

Faced with declining ore reserves and low copper prices, Kennecott closed its Ruth-area mines in May 1978, thus ending the ore trains between Ruth and the McGill smelter. The smelter closed on June 20, 1983, and the Nevada Northern suspended all operations immediately thereafter.

== Current status ==
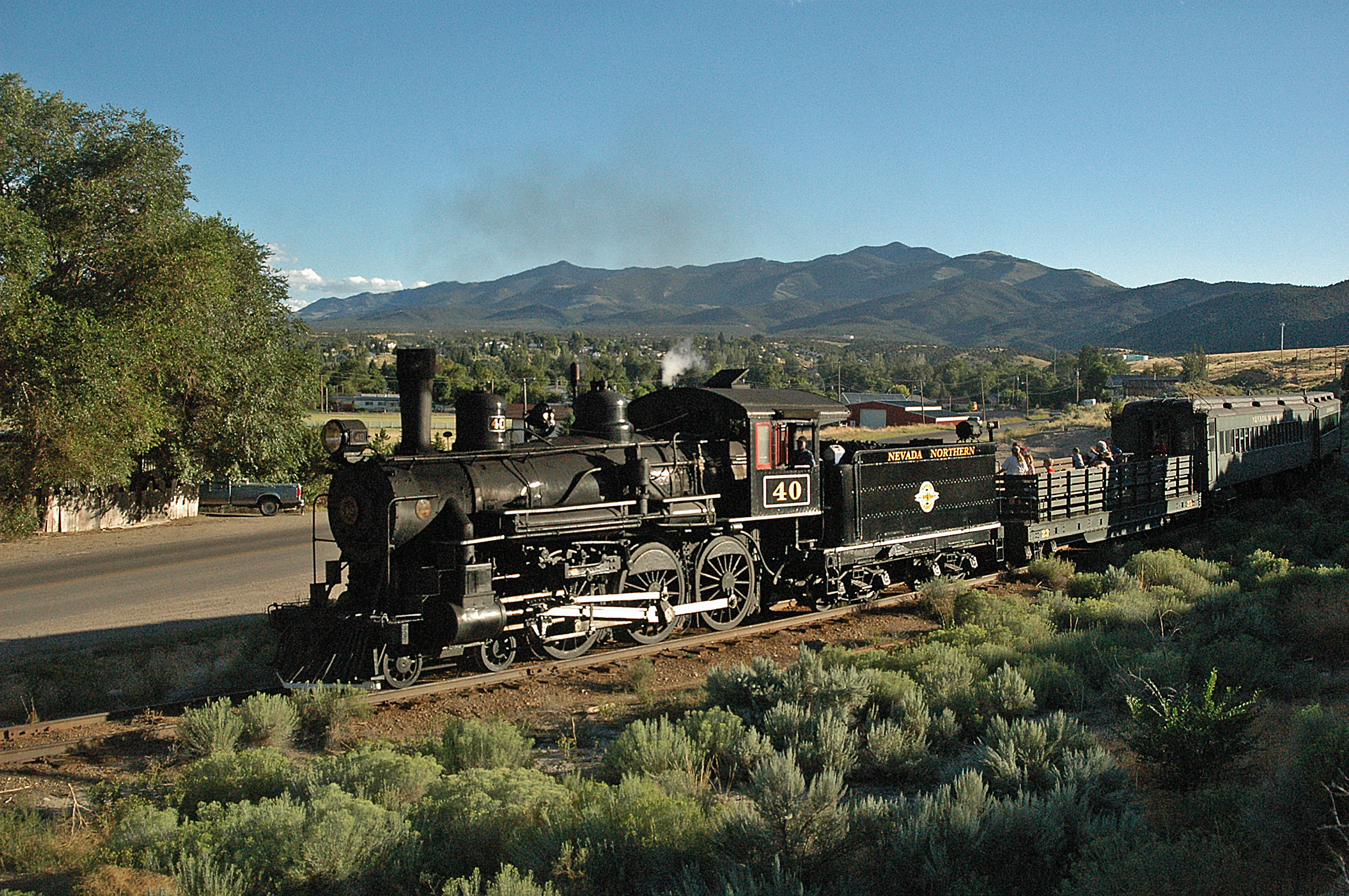
Excursion train hauled by locomotive No. 40, in 2005. #40 was purchased new in 1910 for $13,139.

In a series of donations beginning in 1986, Kennecott transferred the entire Ore Line, as well as the railroad's yard and shop facilities in East Ely, to the White Pine Historical Railroad Foundation, a non-profit organization that today operates the property as the Nevada Northern Railway Museum which operates a heritage railroad on this part of the former NN.

Passenger excursion train service is offered between Ely, Ruth, and McGill using period equipment pulled by historic steam and diesel locomotives.

In April 2006, Nevada's National Historic Landmarks Committee granted unanimous support to nominating the Nevada Northern's East Ely shops complex as a National Historic Landmark. The nomination was approved by the National Park Service on September 27, 2006.

The remainder of the Nevada Northern has largely been moribund since 1983. In 1987, the Los Angeles Department of Water & Power purchased the Cobre-East Ely line, in anticipation of the construction of a coal-fired generating plant along the route, which was never constructed. Meanwhile, the 1990s saw a brief resumption of copper mining near Ruth, this time by BHP. This project saw the construction of additional trackage near Ruth, and the resumption of service from there as far as Shafter by the BHP Nevada Railroad in 1996. Both the mine and railroad shut down again in 1999, and when mining resumed in 2004 concentrates were hauled by truck rather than by rail.

The disused line between Ely and Cobre was acquired by the city of Ely in 2006. Plans near 2008 by Sierra Pacific Resources for the construction of the Ely Energy Center, a 2,500 megawatt coal-fired generating plant in the Ely vicinity raised the possibility that the railroad may have seen another revival, carrying inbound loads of coal to White Pine County. Since then those plans have stalled; however, the Nevada Northern Railway Museum and Ely have considered other options to possibly restore the entire mainline route for heritage use. On October 14, 2021, plans to extend the line to McGill were announced.

== Locomotive roster ==
Number	Builder	Type	Date built	Heritage	Disposition	Notes
1	Schenectady Locomotive Works	4-4-0	June 1869	Central Pacific Railroad No. 161 Juno (1869-April 1885); Southern Pacific No. 1228 (1885-November 1905)	Retired 1923, scrapped 1931.	Purchased for $4,018. Passenger locomotive.
2	Schenectady Locomotive Works	4-6-0	December 1880	Southern Pacific Transportation Company No. 26, 106, 1609, 2045 (1880-December 1905)	Sold to Steptoe Valley Smelting & Mining in 1914, scrapped in 1931.	Purchased for $5,425.
3	Schenectady Locomotive Works	4-6-0	September 1882	Southern Pacific No. 73, 153, 1645, 2075 (1882-December 1905)	Scrapped 1933	
4/10	American Locomotive Company	4-6-0	September 1906	New for $13,400	Sold for scrap in 1951, scrapped 1952.	Built in Scranton, Pennsylvania. Renumbered in 1909. Passenger locomotive.
5	American Locomotive Company	2-8-2T	October 1906	New for $15,371	Rebuilt in April 1913 into No. 80, see below	Built in Dunkirk, New York.
6	American Locomotive Company	0-6-0	August 1910	New	Sold March 1916. Presumed scrapped.	Slopeback tender
7/11	American Locomotive Company	4-6-0	April 1907	New for $13,700.	Sold for scrap 1951, scrapped 1952.	Renumbered October 1911. Passenger locomotive.
8/20	American Locomotive Company	4-6-0	February 1907	New for $14,975	Sold for scrap 1954.	Built in Paterson, New Jersey. Renumbered October 1911. Mixed service.
21	American Locomotive Company	4-6-0	March 1909	New for $13,200.	Scrapped March 1952.	Tender now used on Rotary B.
40	Baldwin Locomotive Works	4-6-0	July 1910	New for $13,139.	Undergoing Boiler Inspection and Restoration since 2020.	Passenger locomotive. Named the State steam locomotive of Nevada in 2009.
80	Nevada Northern	2-8-0	April 1913	Rebuilt from No. 5	Sold for scrap 1951, scrapped 1952.	Tender survives. Mixed service locomotive.
81	Baldwin Locomotive Works	2-8-0	March 1917	New for $23,700.	Active.	Mixed service. Last ran in 1960 and was restored to operation in 2021.
90	American Locomotive Company	2-8-0	April 1908	New for $17,525.	Sold for scrap 1952.	Built in Pittsburgh. Freight locomotive.
91	American Locomotive Company	2-8-0	April 1908	New for $17,525.	Sold for scrap January 1952.	Built in Pittsburgh. Freight locomotive.
92	American Locomotive Company	2-8-0	October 1908	New for $17,585	Sold for scrap January 1952.	Built in Pittsburgh. Freight locomotive.
93	American Locomotive Company	2-8-0	January 1909	New for $17,610	Active.	Built in Pittsburgh. Freight locomotive. Originally retired in 1961. Last steam locomotive on the railroad to retire from revenue service. Restored in 1993. Heavily damaged in a collision with runaway railcars in 1995. Participated in 2002 Winter Olympics on the Heber Valley Railroad following repairs from collision. Beginning in 1993, used for the railway's excursion trains.
94	American Locomotive Company	2-8-0	January 1910	New for $15,908.	Scrapped 1951.	Built in Pittsburgh. Freight.
95	American Locomotive Company	2-8-0	May 1914	New for $16,500.	Scrapped 1951.	Built in Dunkirk. Freight.
96	American Locomotive Company	2-8-0	June 1916	New for $20,125.	Scrapped 1951.	Built in Dunkirk. Freight.
97	American Locomotive Company	2-8-0	April 1910	Bought secondhand for $14,000 (1917).	Scrapped 1954	Built in Dunkirk. Part of canceled order for the Buffalo & Susquehanna Railroad. Sister engine Tooele Valley Railway #11 on static display in Utah.
401	EMD	SD7	August 1952	New	Stored at Los Angeles Department of Water & Power's Intermountain Power Project; to be returned to Nevada Northern	Became LADWP No. P-401 in 1980s. Reacquired by Nevada Northern as of 2023, and awaiting return to Nevada Northern tracks, along with RSD-4 #201.
B	American Locomotive Company	Rotary snowplow	November 1907	New	Storage/Display (snow plow mechanically not functional)	Built in Paterson, New Jersey.

== See also ==
- Nevada Northern Railway Museum
- List of Nevada railroads
