= Nevada Northern Railway Museum =

Museum and heritage railroad in Ely, Nevada

- Nevada Northern Railway East Ely Yards, East Ely Depot
- U.S. National Register of Historic Places
- U.S. National Historic Landmark District
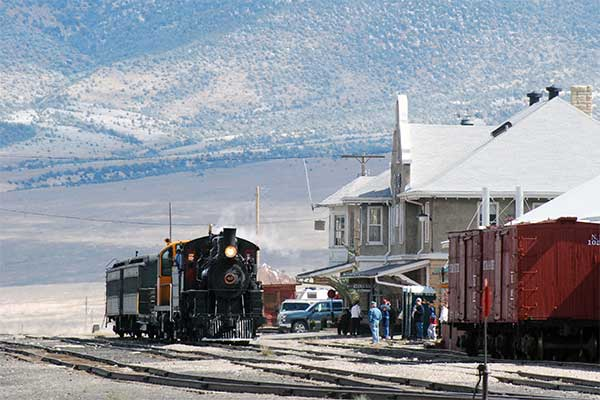
- Passenger train operated by the Nevada Northern Railway Museum, at the Museum's East Ely depot, September 2007.

- Location within Nevada Location within the United States
- Location: Ely, Nevada
- Coordinates: 39°15′33″N 114°52′6″W
- Area: 40 acres (16 ha)
- Built: 1905
- Architect: Frederick Hale
- Architectural style: Late 19th And 20th Century Revivals
- NRHP reference No.: 93000693 (yards), 84002082 (depot)

Significant dates
- Added to NRHP: July 29, 1993 (yards), April 12, 1984 (depot)
- Designated NHLD: September 20, 2006

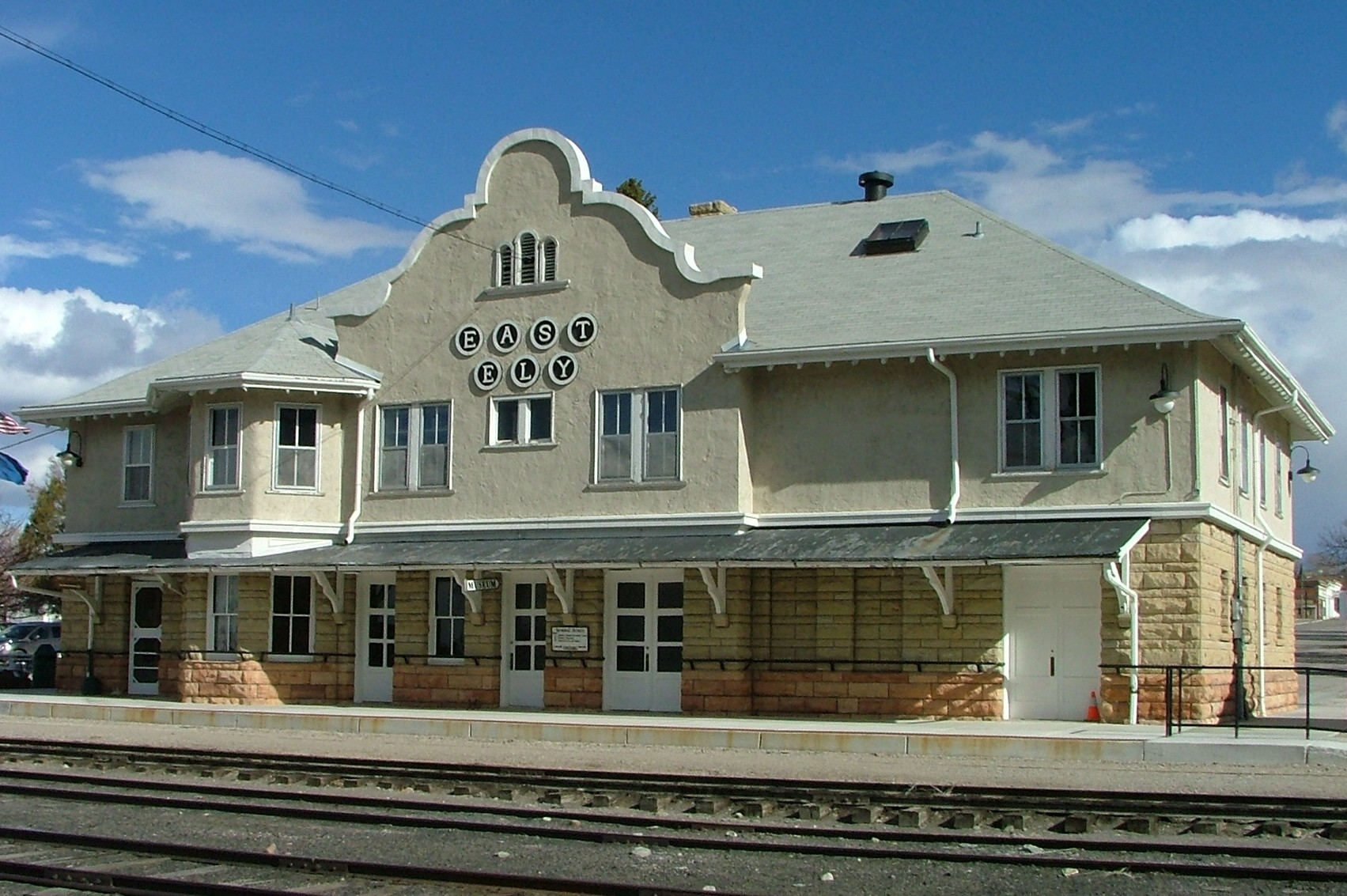
East Ely Depot, built in 1907 for the Nevada Northern Railway.

The Nevada Northern Railway Museum is a railroad museum and heritage railroad located in Ely, Nevada, owned by the State of Nevada and operated by a historic foundation dedicated to the preservation of the Nevada Northern Railway.

Museum activities include restoration and operation of historic railroad equipment and various hands on experiences and a variety of special events including seasonal trains for Halloween and Santa-themed trains for Christmas. This is one of the few places in the world where visitors can actually operate a steam locomotive, but this experience requires some advanced planning.

== Location and history ==
The museum is situated at the East Ely Yards, which are part of the Nevada Northern Railway. The site is listed on the United States National Register of Historic Places as the Nevada Northern Railway East Ely Yards and Shops and is also known as the "Nevada Northern Railway Complex". The rail yards were designated a National Historic Landmark District on September 27, 2006. The site was cited as one of the best-preserved early 20th-century railroad yards in the nation, and a key component in the growth of the region's copper mining industry. Developed in the first decade of the 20th century, it served passengers and freight until 1983, when the Kennecott Copper Company, its then-owner, donated the yard to a local non-profit for preservation. The property came complete with all of the company records of the Nevada Northern from its inception.

== Collection ==
The museum collection includes three of the railroad's original steam locomotives, an electric locomotive and several diesel-electric locomotives, as well as a collection of maintenance equipment and numerous historic freight and passenger rail cars. Two of the steam locomotives, #81 and #93, are in operation in regularly scheduled events throughout the year; with #40 currently out of service for an overhaul. Locomotive #40 is the official State Locomotive of Nevada. The museum also maintains an extensive fleet of its original rolling stock, including passenger cars, wood-side box cars, ore cars, and work trains, all dating from the 1910s. It has the oldest operating tank car and the oldest operating coal-fired steam crane on any American railroad.

During the 2002 Winter Olympics, held in Salt Lake City, the Nevada Northern Railway was part of the Olympic Steam Team, carrying spectators to the Soldier Hollow Olympic venue on the Heber Valley Railroad; with locomotive #93 sent to Utah to participate. The day prior to the Opening Ceremony of the games, #93 joined Heber's two steam locomotives in a triple-headed train, and used to transport the Olympic flame from Soldier Hollow to Heber City, Utah as part of the torch relay.

In late October 2020, locomotive #40 was taken out of service for its Federal Railroad Administration (FRA) mandated 1,472-day inspection and overhaul. 2-8-0 #81 returned to service in September 2021, after undergoing a boiler test in 2020. Also in storage at the museum is Steptoe Valley Mining & Smelting #3, a H.K. Porter, Inc. steam locomotive which was used at the McGill smelter and had a brief preservation career on the early Niles Canyon Railway.

== Depot building ==
The East Ely Depot served passengers on the Nevada Northern. The Mission Revival style depot was designed by Frederick Hale and built in 1907. It reflects a standardized vernacular that borrows primarily from the Mission Revival style, as well as from Renaissance Revival.

The two story depot is set on a stone foundation. The ground floor is rusticated stone, separated from the upper level by a painted stone belt course, with a stuccoed second story. The gables are curvilinear in the accepted Mission Revival style. The well-preserved interior retains separate men's and women's waiting rooms, with baggage and express rooms. Offices are on the second floor.

The depot was a significant location on the Nevada Northern as the chief embarkation point for the copper mining region of White Pine County. The location of the depot was a matter of controversy between the railroad and residents of Ely, who successfully sued the railroad to change the depot's name from Ely to East Ely to reflect its distance from the main townsite. The railroad, originally owned by the Nevada Consolidated Copper Company, was transferred to the Kennecott Copper Company in 1933 when it took over Consolidated's mining operations. Passenger service on the Nevada Northern stopped in 1941, and the depot was used for Kennecott offices until 1985. The state of Nevada acquired the depot in 1990 for the museum.

The East Ely Depot was listed on the National Register of Historic Places in 1984.

== Heritage Railroad ==
The museum and Ely City own the entire original Nevada Northern Railway route, however only a small segment from Ruth to Ely is currently in use by the railroad for the tourist trains; plans to reopen the line to McGill were announced on October 14, 2021, by way of a $10 million federal grant. Another isolated segment connecting to the Union Pacific mainline at Shafter, Nevada is used for car storage.

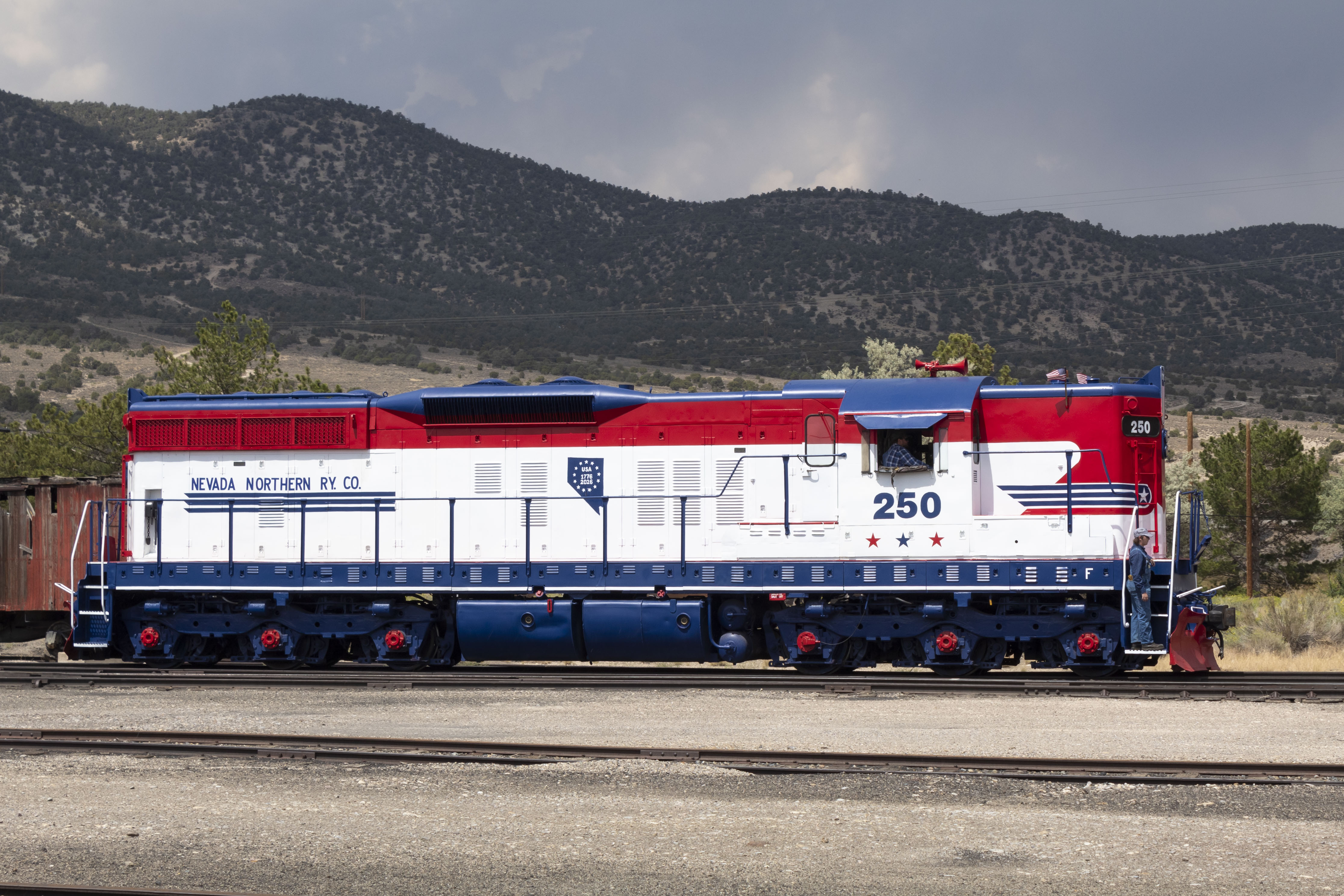
Nevada Northern, 250 formerly BHP Nevada Railroad 204; a locomotive painted by the museum for the United States Semiquincentennial.

== In popular culture ==
The depot building was used for scenes in the 2001 film, Rat Race. The museum appeared in a 2010 episode of Modern Marvels, titled "Super Steam." The museum also appeared in six episodes of American Restoration, and was referenced in a 2017 episode of The Big Bang Theory. The Railroad's locomotive #40 was featured prominently in the 2017 J-pop music video "Black Train" by artists Tsuyoshi Nagabuchi, with the artist riding the front of the locomotive while singing.

In 1987, Number 40 appeared in the Made-For-Television movie: Once Upon A Texas Train starring country singer Willie Nelson which was broadcast on the CBS TV network in early January 1988, Albeit in the opening & closing credits. Over the Years, some of the equipment at the museum was shown in several episodes of the History Channel's Reality Show: American Restoration.

In 2019, the railroad's shop cat "Dirt" went viral after photos of him were posted online by professional photographer Steve Crise. Born in 2008, the cat has been named the railroad's mascot. Dirt died on January 10, 2023. The museum announced the cat's death publicly the following day along with plans to place two bronze statues of Dirt on site, with one near the cat's grave site, and one in the machine shop where the cat lived.

== See also ==
- List of National Historic Landmarks in Nevada
- National Register of Historic Places listings in White Pine County, Nevada
