= Cobre, Nevada =

- Ghost town
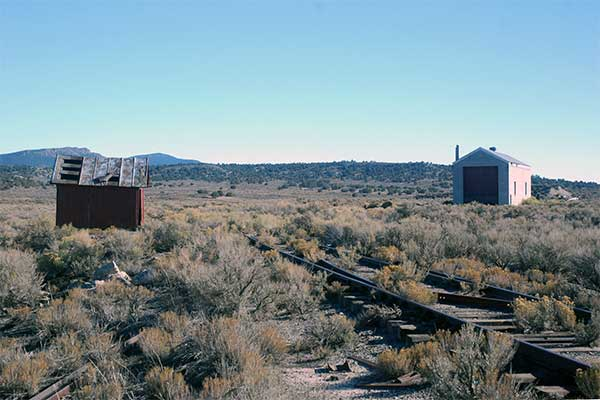
- Surviving buildings in Cobre (September 2007). Both buildings were owned by the Nevada Northern Railway; the structure on the left is a handcar shed, and the structure on the right is an engine house.

- Location within the state of Nevada Cobre (the United States)
- Coordinates: 41°06′43″N 114°24′03″W
- Country: United States
- State: Nevada
- County: Elko
- Elevation: 5,922 ft (1,805 m)
- Time zone: UTC-8 (Pacific (PST))
  - Summer (DST): UTC-7 (PDT)
- GNIS feature ID: 845410

Cobre is a ghost town in Elko County, Nevada, United States.

== Overview ==
The town was located at the former interchange point between the Southern Pacific Railroad and the Nevada Northern Railway, and came into being when construction of the Nevada Northern began in 1905. The Nevada Northern was constructed primarily to serve the copper mines and smelter near Ely, Nevada; cobre is Spanish for "copper." In 1910, Cobre reached its peak population with a total of 60 residents.

A post office was established at Cobre in 1906. It was discontinued in 1956.

The population was 50 in 1940.

== See also ==
- List of ghost towns in Nevada
