= Swakopmund–Windhoek line =

Railway line in Namibia

Swakopmund–Windhoek

History
- Opened: 1897

Technical
- Character: Original alignment 1902–1911
- Track gauge: 3 ft 6 in (1,067 mm)
- Old gauge: 600 mm (1 ft 11 5/8 in)

The Swakopmund–Windhoek line was a main 600 mm (1 ft 11 5/8 in) narrow-gauge railway line in Namibia. It was built in 1897 and operated until 1990 when the route name was changed.

Today the route via Swakopmund to Walvis Bay operates under the name of Windhoek–Kranzberg railway and the Kranzberg–Walvis Bay railway. The track width was converted in 1910 to 3 ft 6 in (1,067 mm) narrow gauge and operated by TransNamib.

== 600 mm gauge railway ==
=== Construction ===
Since 1897, the existing ox wagon transport system at the time, collapsed after a rinderpest outbreak in German South West Africa, and was designed to be replaced with a 600 mm (1 ft 11 5/8 in) narrow-gauge railway using sufficiently available feldbahn equipment from Germany. A railway was commissioned from the Swakopmund port to Windhoek of the former colony German South West Africa. The work was managed by four officers and carried out by 290 soldiers and 800 local workers. It was completed on 19 June 1902.

=== Operations ===
For daily operations 34 steam locomotives were scheduled to be kept under steam and 20 more were in reserve. Part of the locomotives were coupled to twin locomotives pairs, the so-called Zwillinge (German for twins). There were:

- 7 carriages 1st class
- 2 carriages 2nd class
- 5 baggage cars
- 308 goods wagons (loading weight: 5 tons)
- 83 water trucks (as additional tenders for steam locomotives)
- 50 Work and inspection draisines

The journey from Swakopmund to Windhoek, which took ten days in the period before the railroad, was shortened by train first by three, then to two days. There was only day traffic, so travelers had to stay in Karibib overnight. The travel speed was less than 14 km/h.

Despite the relatively primitive technical equipment, the train brought significant better transport services, particularly during the Herero and Namaqua Genocide in 1904-1905.

Initially, the train was operated by the Imperial Railway Command. On 1 April 1907 however, the civil administration of the protected area assumed duty for operating the system. The central workshop was in Karibib .

=== Gallery ===
Swakopmund-Windhoek Line Pictures

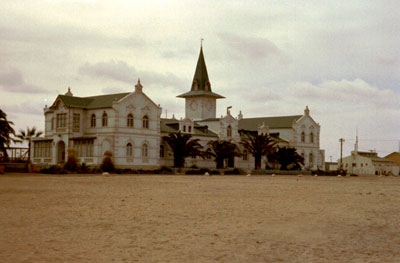
Swakopmund station

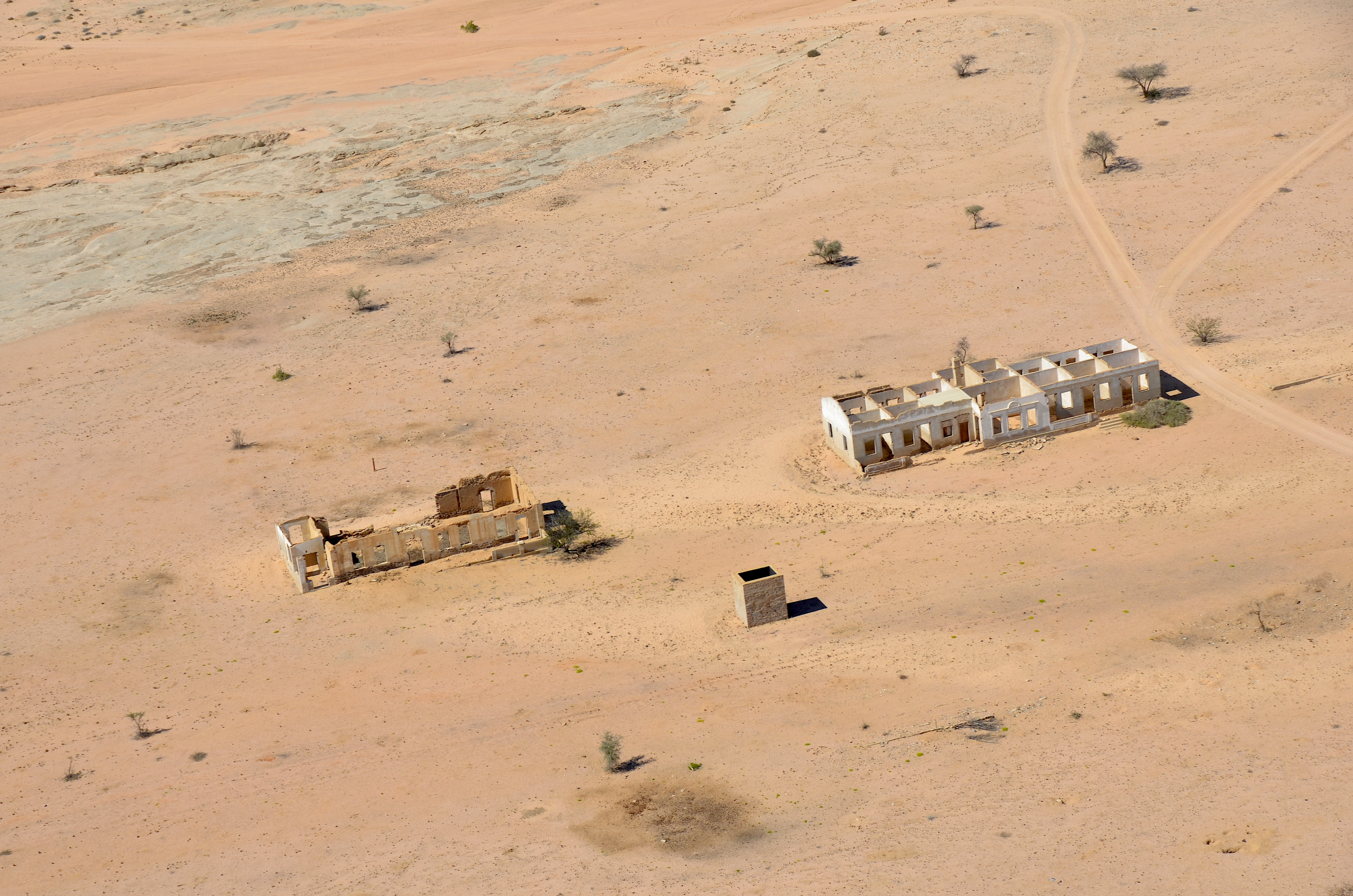
Aerial view of the old Railway Station Jakalswater (2017)

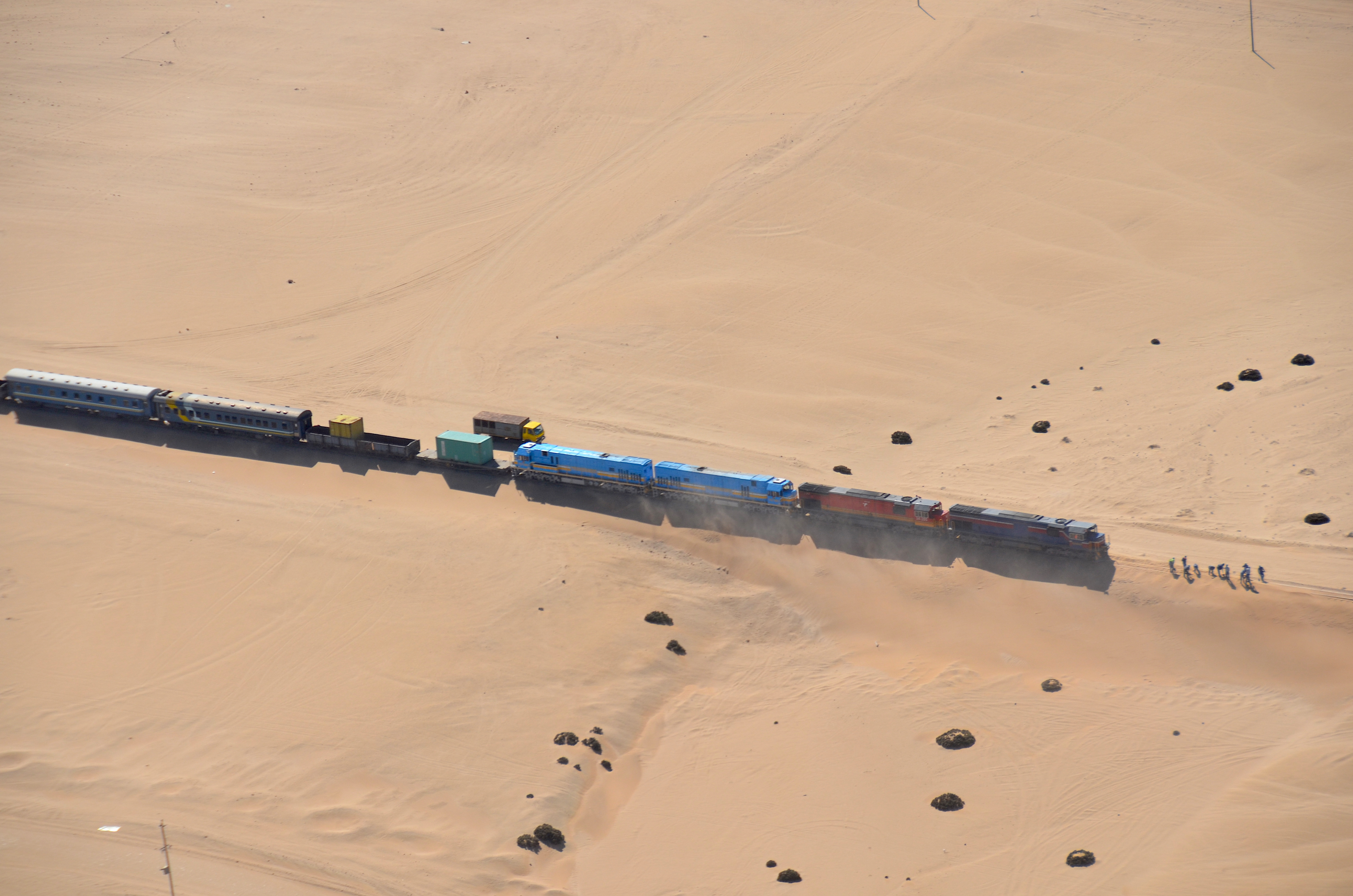
Railway track from Swakopmund to Walvis Bay covered by sand (2017)

== 3 ft 6 in (1,067 mm) gauge railway ==
In 1910/1911 the section of Windhoek–Karibib was converted to 3 ft 6 in (1,067 mm) narrow gauge because previously the Lüderitz Railway and the railway line Windhoek–Keetmanshoop were already built with 3 ft 6 in (1,067 mm) narrow gauge. The decision to use this gauge was due to the relative proximity of the South African network, which had been built at the same gauge. When converting the railway Swakopmund–Windhoek–Karibib section, curve radii were flattened and gradients were eased, so that the line was three kilometers longer, but on a more general course. The cost of this conversion corresponded to the initial construction costs and could only be applied because of the diamond discoveries since 1908, which provided the necessary financial means. The section of the state railway from Swakopmund to Karibib on Jakalswater remained at the original 600 mm (1 ft 11 5/8 in) narrow gauge and was only serviced twice per month in each direction.

The traffic between Swakopmund and Windhoek was conducted over the Otavi railway between Swakopmund and Karibib which was also constructed at 600 mm (1 ft 11 5/8 in) narrow gauge. In Karibib all passengers had to change trains and all the goods were transshipped to the 3 ft 6 in (1,067 mm) narrow-gauge railway line. This expansion allowed a one-day journey between the coast and capital (and vice versa) for the first time, with the express train of the Otavi line and a corresponding express train on the state railway route.

With the outbreak of the First World War, the German colonial forces fled the coast and retreated inland, destroying both the Otavi line and the state railway line in the Karibib direction to Rössing. The British repositioned to Walvis Bay and immediately converted the Otavibahn towards Karibib to 3 ft 6 in (1,067 mm) narrow gauge, with the last stretch between Usakos and Karibib being realigned. The 600 mm (1 ft 11 5/8 in) narrow-gauge network of the Otavibahn north of Usakos remained in operation. The workshop serving locomotives for both track gauges was now based in Usakos, the one in Karibib was closed. The old state railway line over Jakalswater was abandoned. The total distance between Swakopmund and Windhoek thus saw continuous traffic again now on 3 ft 6 in (1,067 mm) narrow-gauge track instead of 600 mm (1 ft 11 5/8 in) narrow-gauge track.

== See also ==
- Rail transport in Namibia
