= Electric railway of the White Knob Copper Co. =

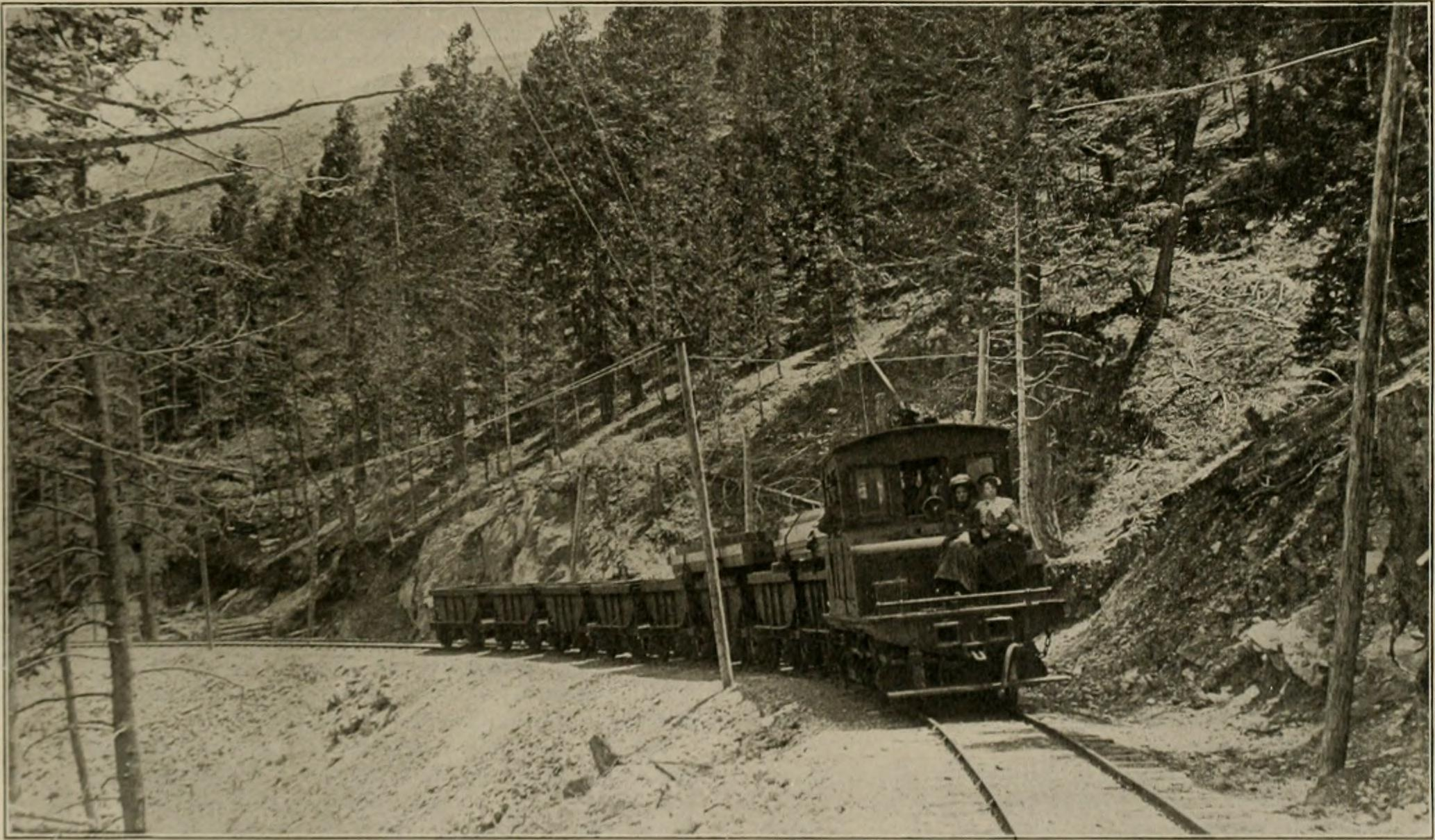

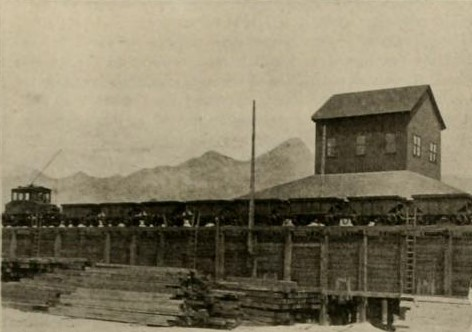
- Electric locomotive and ore cars

Overview
- Headquarters: Mackay, Idaho
- Locale: Mackay, Idaho
- Dates of operation: 1903–

Technical
- Track gauge: 1,435 mm (4 ft 8 1/2 in) standard gauge
- Length: 7.1 miles (11.4 km)

The electric railway of the White Knob Copper Co., Ltd. was operated by the White Knob Copper Co. at White Knob near Mackay, Idaho, in connection with its mines, having 7.1 miles (11.4 km) of railroad, two electric locomotives and 40 ore cars. The difference in level over the seven miles was 2,100 feet (640 m), an average of 6 per cent. Eighty tons of ore were handled by each train.

== Track ==
The White Knob Copper Co., Ltd., of Mackay, Idaho, built a 7.1 miles (11.4 km) long single track railroad for the purpose of hauling ore in 1903. The railroad was put into operation in fall 1903 and was used entirely for freight trains, eight or ten cars being operated in one train.

The entire line was on a grade of about 6 per cent and the roadbed was laid with 60 lb/yard (30 kg/m) T-rails on rough cedar ties, 2 feet (61 cm) between centers. Angle-bar joints were used and the railroad was rock ballasted.

== Operation ==
The railroad, was used exclusively as an industrial railway. There were two trains in regular service each of which carried about 80 tons of ore and each train made three to four trips daily.

The rolling stock included two Baldwin-Westinghouse electric locomotives 21 feet 3 inches (6.48 m) long and 6 feet 9 inches (2.06 m) wide over all. The locomotives had 30 inches (76 cm) chilled castiron solid wheels with 3 1/4 by 7 inches (83 mm × 178 mm) journals. They were equipped with Weslinghonse automatic air brakes. The rolling stock included 40 ore cars of 8 tons capacity, of the gondola type, each weighing 6,500 lb (2.9 t), also two flat cars and two side dump ore cars, all of which were made by the American Steel & Foundry Co. These were all equipped with Westinghouse automatic air brakes.

The regular scheduled speed of cars was 12 miles per hour (19 km/h), and the trains were operated by a dispatcher. A telephone system was installed along the line for use in dispatching.

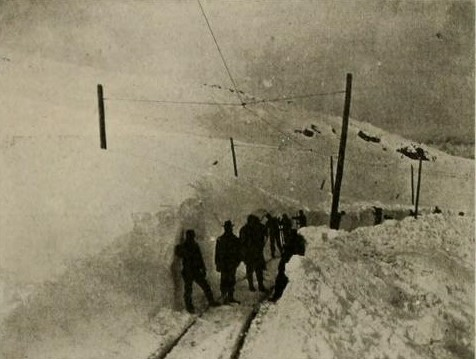
Snow in the winter of 1903/04

The snow on the tracks of this road was 10 feet (3.0 m) deep in some places in the winter of 1903/04, but the company was able to operate it every day. The snow plow equipment consisted of two home-made pilot plows which were attached to locomotives.

== Electrification ==
The overhead line consisted of a No. 00 trolley wire and two aluminum feeders of seven-strand No. 4 wires, each of which was four miles long. The overhead material was furnished by the Ohio Brass Co. The railroad wound up through the hills and the feeders cut across ridges at times and in other places followed the track in order to give lapping points at a distance of every 500 feet (150 m). The poles were 25 feet (7.6 m) long, of pine, and were 6 inches (15 cm) in diameter at the top.

The power plant operated both the smelter and the railroad so that individual data are difficult to obtain. Water power has been acquired by the company and steps were being taken in 1904 to construct a new power house, lo supply both the smelter and the railroad from this water power instead of by the steam plant initially used.

The steam power house was 150 by 70 feet (46 m × 21 m) and was a wooden building. It contained six 60-h.p. flue tubular boilers and three 155-h.p. McEwen engines directly connected to Westinghousc 500-Volt direct current generators. The boilers were fed with hot water from the blast furnaces. The switchboard was of marble, having six panels. It contained Weston ammeters and voltmeters and Westinghouse circuit breakers.

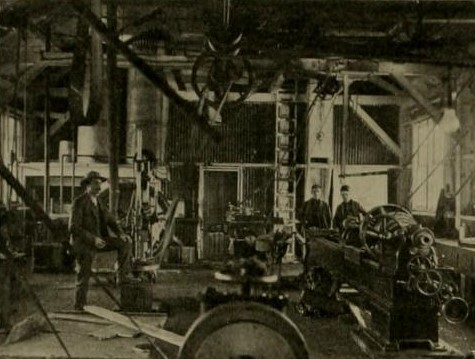
Repair shop

There was a car-house and a repair shop owned by the company, located at the smelter terminal of the road. The car-house was 35 by 77 feet (11 m × 23 m) in dimensions and was used for storing the locomotives and for repairing cars. The building was of wood and had a 3 inches (76 mm) diameter fire line for fire protection. Two repair men were constantly employed at this shop, and it was equipped with a lathe, shaper, drill press, bolt machine, pipe machine, emery grinder and also a complete outfit for rewinding the motors of the locomotives and a blacksmith shop.

== Management ==
The railroad was under the management of the White Knob Copper Co., Ltd, initially with the following personnel:

- E. E. Slaughter, superintendent and electrical engineer
- C. G. Gunther, chief engineer
- Roy Hoffman, master mechanic
- E. M. Jones, electrician

== Conversion ==
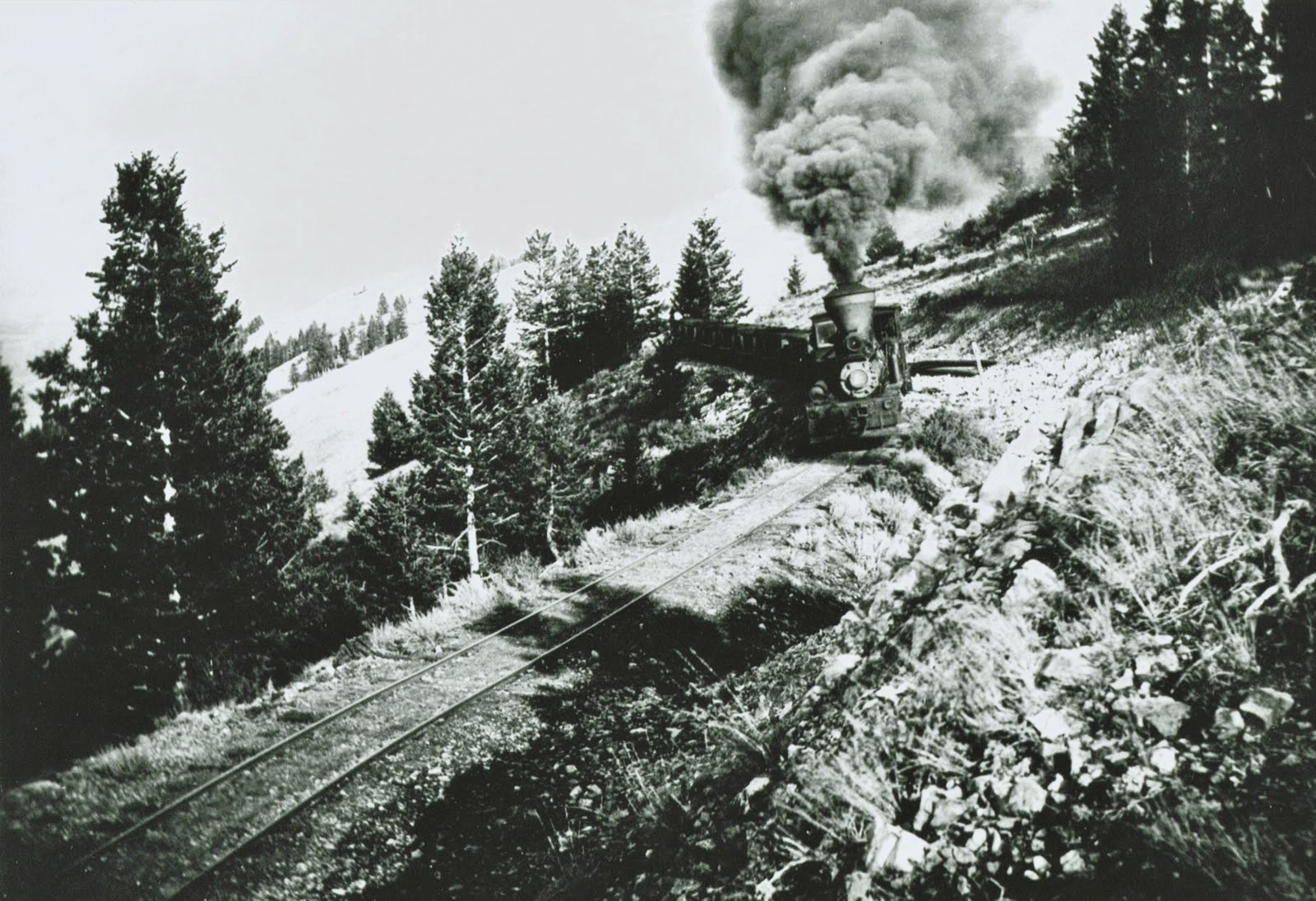
Shay engine climbing-up Mine Hill to White Knob

After seven different managers had tried unsuccessfully to operate the property at a profit, the company was sold to George W. Young of New York on 18 March 1905, for $1 million. He replaced the expensive electric locomotives with a Shay geared steam locomotive. A 3 miles (4.8 km) aerial tramway replaced the 7 1/2 miles (12.1 km) Shay railroad in 1917/18 at a cost of $125,000.

== See also ==
- BHP Nevada Railroad: a copper ore railway in Nevada
- Mansfeld Mining Railway: a copper ore railway in Germany
- Otavi Mining and Railway Company: a copper ore railway in Namibia
