= South West Africa Company =

British company

The South West Africa Company Limited (German: Südwestafrikanische Gesellschaft) was a majority British owned and controlled company established under English law on August 18, 1892, in German South West Africa, the present day Namibia. The company was headquartered in London and had a representative office in Berlin.

== History ==
South West Africa was the most important settlement colony in the then German Empire. Despite this, during the early 1890s, the German Colonial Society for Southwest Africa struggled to secure support from German investors, who showed little interest in the development of the region. As a result, a Hamburg-based syndicate formed the South West Africa Company as a joint venture between British and German shareholders. Its statutes required the Board to have at least three German members. In practice the majority of members were German. Based on a decision made on 2 March 1900, the company had to submit to the supervision of the German Reichskanzler.

On 3 August 1892, the company acquired the Damaraland concession, which included 13,000 square kilometres of land and a monopoly over mining in the region. In return, the company undertook the building of a railway from Swakopmund to the mines at Otavi. The company's agents undertook several expeditions to investigate its newly acquired territories, determine their economic value, and consider the route of the projected railway line.

After the Rinderpest epidemic of 1897, the Company surrendered its monopoly over railway construction in the region. It had acquired a substantial stake in other businesses operating there: the Hanseatic Agriculture, Mining and Trading Company; the Kaokoland and Mining Company; the Damara and Namaqua Trading Company; and the Otavi Mining and Railway Company.

After World War I, Germany lost its colonies, including South West Africa but the South West Africa Company continued to trade.
