= Otavi Mining and Railway Company =

Railway and mining company

Otavi Railway

History
- Opened: 1906

Technical
- Line length: 567 km (352 mi)
- Track gauge: 3 ft 6 in (1,067 mm)
- Old gauge: 600 mm (1 ft 11 5/8 in)
- Minimum radius: 150 m (492 ft)

The Otavi Mining and Railway Company (Otavi Minen- und Eisenbahn-Gesellschaft or OMEG) was a railway and mining company in German South West Africa (today's Namibia). It was founded on 6 April 1900 in Berlin with the Disconto-Gesellschaft and the South West Africa Company as major shareholders.

== Construction ==
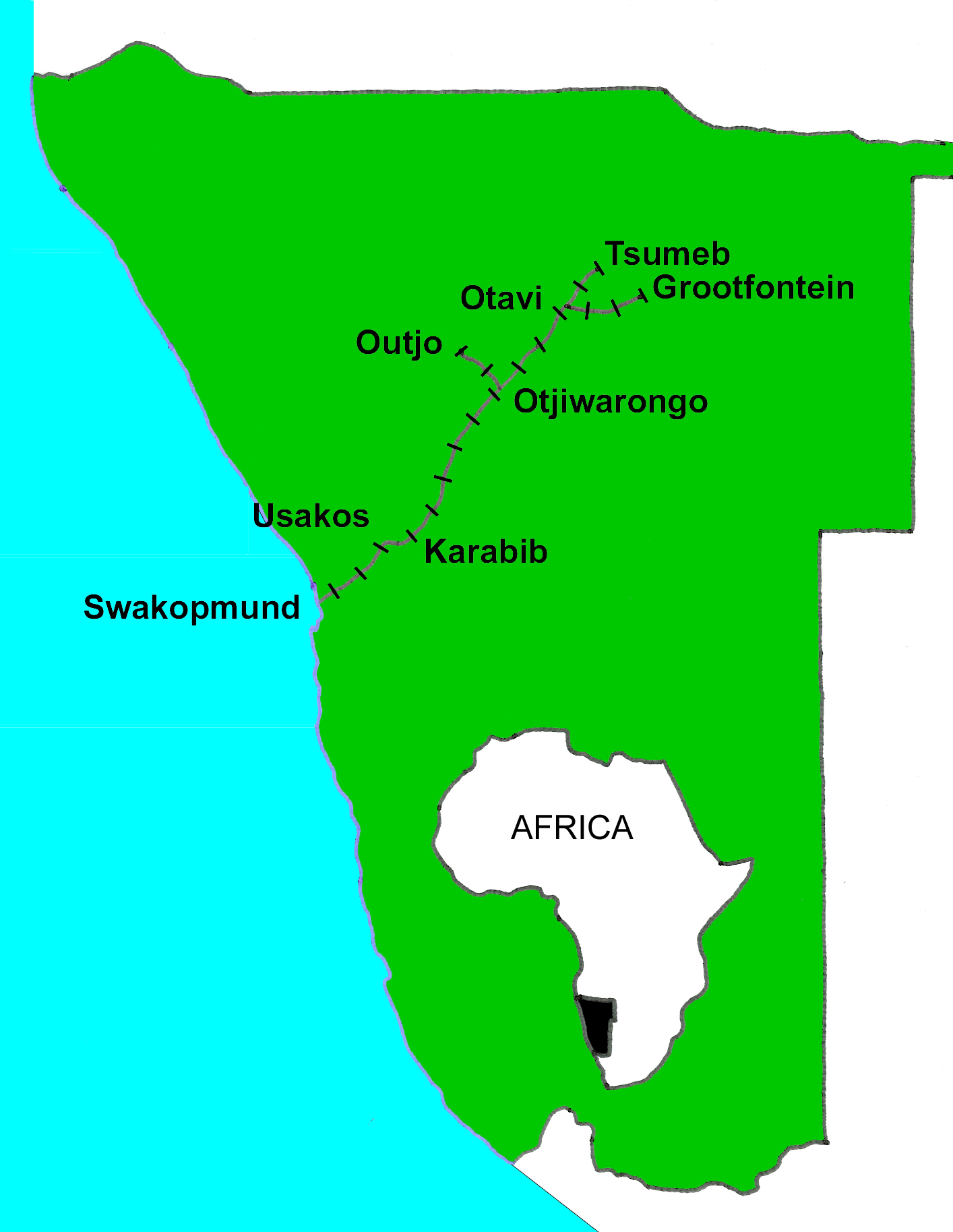
OMEG railway prior to 1915.

OMEG built a 600 mm (1 ft 11 5/8 in) narrow gauge railway extending 567 kilometres (352 mi) from Swakopmund on the Atlantic coast to the mines of Tsumeb. Construction began in 1903 and reached Tsumeb three years later. The first 225 kilometres (140 mi) of railway required 110 steel bridges to cross deeply eroded gullies through sparsely vegetated arid terrain. Most were deck plate girders. The railway, known as the Otavibahn, was the longest 600 mm (1 ft 11 5/8 in) gauge railway in the world at its time of construction.

Construction coincided with the Herero and Namaqua Genocide. Delays resulted from labor shortages and military heeresfeldbahn operations. A 91-kilometer branch was completed in 1908 from Otavi to mines near Grootfontein.

During World War I, German troops had moved inland by the time South African troops reached Swakopmund in January, 1915. German forces destroyed the railroad as they retreated, and South African forces reconstructed a 3 ft 6 in (1,067 mm) narrow gauge line over the route to Karabib in 1915. German troops surrendered following defeat at Otavi in July, 1915; and service was re-established over the remaining 600 mm (1 ft 11 5/8 in) narrow gauge line from the railway shops at Usakos with freight transfer facilities at Karabib.

== Nationalization and conversion to Cape gauge ==
The Otavi line was nationalized in 1923. Train service was interrupted by a locust infestation in 1924 until steam nozzles were installed on locomotives to sweep the insects off the rails before their crushed bodies could reduce traction under the locomotive wheels. The worst flooding in forty years caused extensive washouts in 1925.

The Tsumeb mines closed in 1933. German rearmament activity reopened the mines from 1936 until the South African government closed the mine as enemy property in 1940. Tsumeb mines reopened again in 1946. The remainder of the line was regauged to 3 ft 6 in (1,067 mm) narrow gauge in 1961 and became part of the TransNamib.

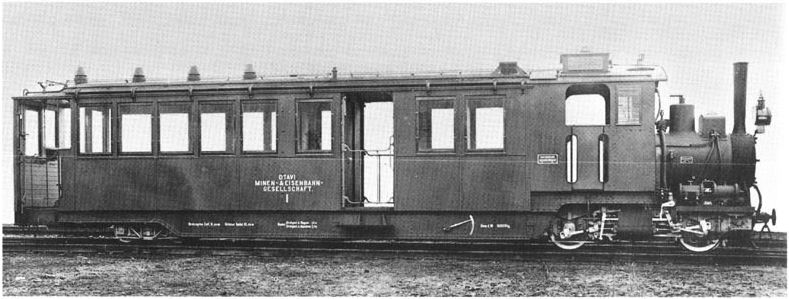
Steam railcar supplied to the Otavi Railway

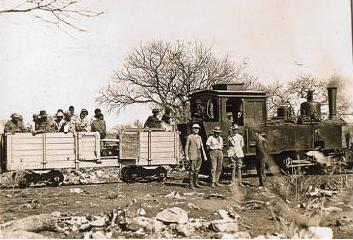
OMEG tank locomotive with high-side gondola near Tsumeb about 1931.

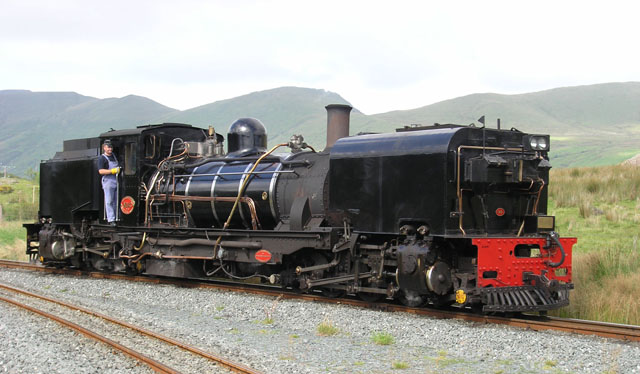
South African Railways 2 ft (610 mm) gauge SAR NGG 16 Class Garratt, preserved in operating condition on the Welsh Highland Railway. This later version of the locomotives used from 1927 to 1933 is the model considered for use in 1958.

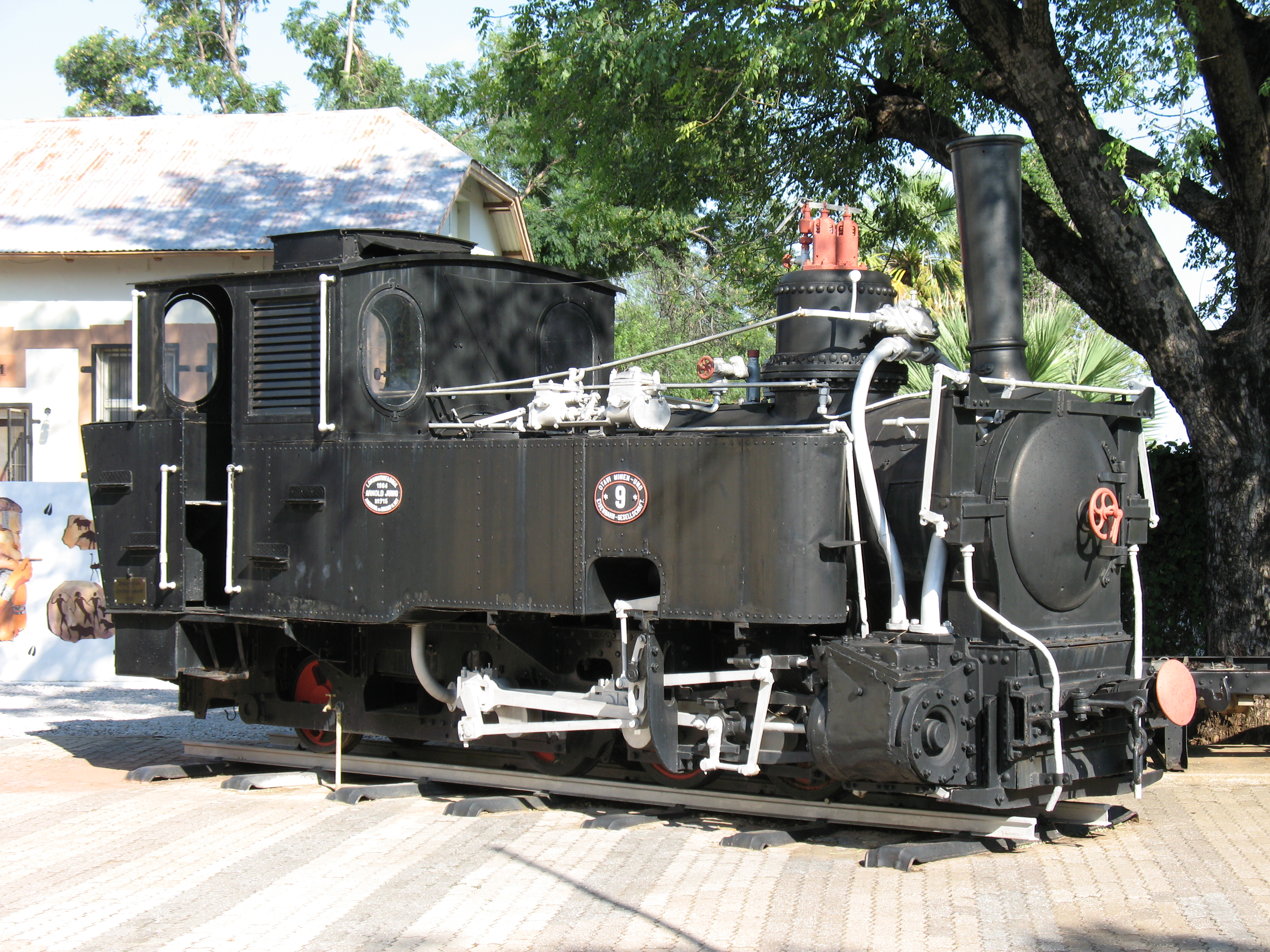
Arnold Jung Locomotive from 1905 of the Otavi Mining and Railway Company in Tsumeb, Namibia

== Rolling stock ==
The first locomotives designed for regular service were fifteen 22-tonne (21.7-long-ton; 24.3-short-ton) 0-6-2T built by Arn. Jung. Henschel & Sohn built twelve locomotives similar to the Jung design and three 0-6-0T. Twenty 8-wheel auxiliary tenders carrying 8 cubic metres of water and 3.5 tonnes (3.4 long tons; 3.9 short tons) of coal were built to enable these tank locomotives to complete longer runs. Henschel & Sohn built three HD class 2-8-2 in 1912 with separate 8-wheel tenders for long-distance running. These locomotives weighed 59 tonnes (58 long tons; 65 short tons) (including the 26-tonne (25.6-long-ton; 28.7-short-ton) tender) and remained in service for 50 years as the 2-8-2 type became standard for the railway.

By 1913, train service included 4 express trains, 14 mixed trains, and 29 freight trains each week. Express and mixed trains included a baggage car, a car for African passengers, and a coach for first and second class passengers. The passenger cars carried concrete ballast in a depressed center section to minimize the possibility of wind tipping a lightly loaded car off the rails. Express trains stopped only at designated stations, but other trains would stop at intermediate points when transport was required. Equipment included:

- 96 low-side ore gondolas
- 55 high-side gondolas
- 20 limestone gondolas
- 20 boxcars
- 12 tank cars
- 4 stock cars
- 3 passenger coaches
- An executive business car with a kitchen, a bathroom, and an office convertible to a bedroom at night. There were also some self-powered steam rail cars with a coal bunker, a mail compartment, 2 compartments for Europeans, and 4 for Africans.

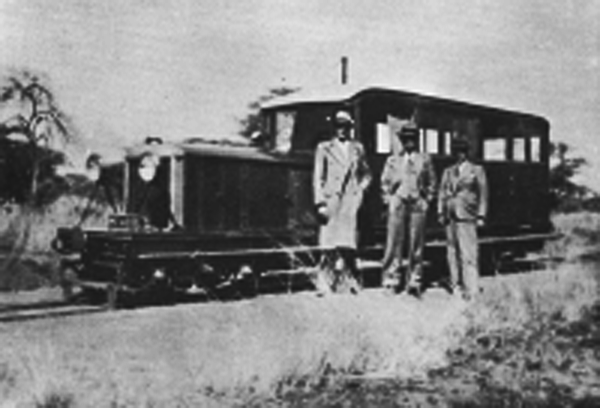
The gasoline engine "Crown Prince".

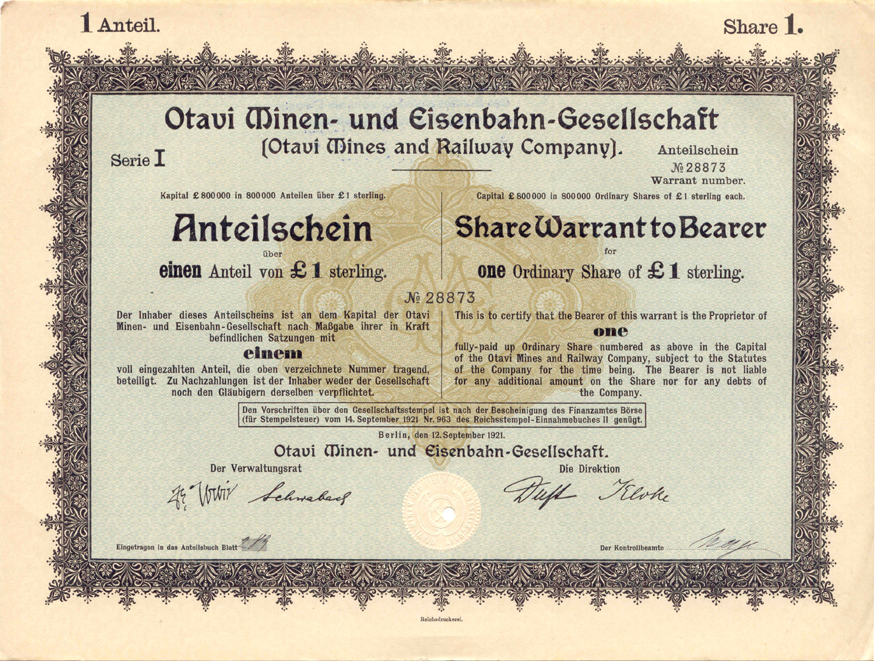
Share Warrant to Bearer of the Otavi Mining and Railway Company, 1921

A special 7-tonne (6.9-long-ton; 7.7-short-ton) rail motor coach was built for an anticipated visit of Kronprinz Wilhelm in 1914. A 6-cylinder Daimler-Benz gasoline engine gave the car a speed of 38 metres per second (120 ft/s) (137 km/h or 85 mph) and the title of the fastest 2 ft (610 mm) gauge rail car. World War I prevented Wilhelm's visit, and the car was used as an inspection vehicle after the war.

Two Henschel & Sohn 4-6-2 locomotives built in 1914 had disappeared during the war; but Baldwin Locomotive Works delivered a 4-6-2 in 1916. A coach converted for meal service from 1916 to 1931 is believed to be the only 2 ft (610 mm) gauge dining car ever operated.

Six more Henschel & Sohn 2-8-2 were delivered in 1922. These locomotives were designated South African Railways (SAR) NG5 class. Three SAR NGG 13 Class 2-6-2+2-6-2 Garratt locomotives were used from 1927 until 1933. Henschel & Sohn delivered three SAR NG15 Class 2-8-2 locomotives in 1931. Four sleeping cars were built for the railroad in 1938; when Henschel & Sohn delivered three more 2-8-2 SAR NG15 Class. Fifteen more SAR NG15 Class 2-8-2 locomotives were delivered as three groups of five in 1949, 1952, and 1957. Purchase of additional Garratt locomotives was briefly considered in 1958 but cancelled due to the upcoming track gauge conversion to 3 ft 6 in (1,067 mm) narrow gauge.

== See also ==
- Slippery rail
- South African Class NG 15 2-8-2
- Swakopmund–Windhoek line
- Two foot gauge railways in South Africa
- Mansfeld Mining Railway: a copper ore railway in Germany
- White Knob Copper Electric Railway: a copper ore railway in the United States
- BHP Nevada Railroad: a copper ore railway in the United States
