= White Knob, Idaho =

- White Knob
- U.S. National Register of Historic Places
- Location within Idaho
- Location: Custer County, Idaho
- Nearest city: Mackay, Idaho
- Coordinates: 43°53′59.2″N 114°41′09.8″W
- Built: 1884
- NRHP reference No.: 76000671

White Knob, Idaho is a ghost town in Custer County, Idaho. It is situated on Mine Hill between the town of Mackay, Idaho and the White Knob Mountains in the Pioneer Mountains.

== History ==
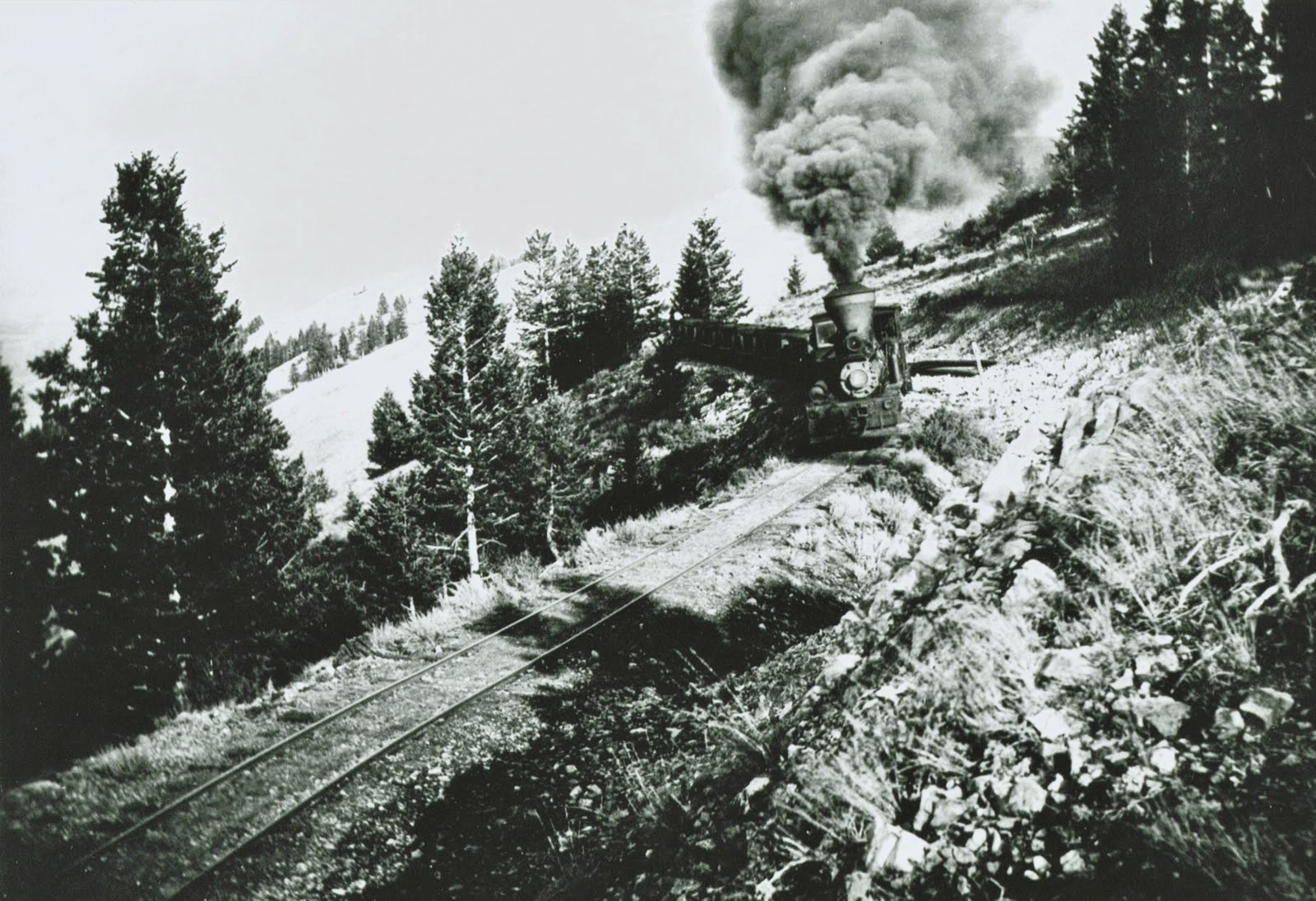
A Shay Locomotive travels up Mine Hill to White Knob.

In 1879, copper was discovered in the White Knob Mountains near current day Mackay, Idaho. White Knob began as a mining town in this new Alder Creek Mining District. The electric railway of the White Knob Copper Co. and subsequently an aerial cable tramway were used to transport the ore from White Knob to the smelter at the railway station in Mackay. The town was home to a school, a general store, and post office. The mine closed in 1928 prompting the decline of the town as more residents were living in Mackay. The school was closed in 1932.

In 1999 the Mackay Historical Preservation Committee was formed and secured a $250,000 award toward preserving the White Knob and Mine Hill site. They have since reinforced the tram towers, restored the Shay Railroad Trestle, restored several buildings, and installed informative signs and markers along an established trail.

== Currently ==
White Knob is listed as a ghost town on the National Historical Register. It is managed by the South Custer Historical Society and the White Knob Historical Preservation Committee of Mackay, ID, and is accessible to the public by foot, ATV, horseback, and truck. Remaining features of the current site are old road beds, restored railroad trestle, restored and derelict cabins, mill and smelter site, aerial cable tramway towers and headhouse, and grave sites. The extensive site is currently owned by the Bureau of Land Management, private individuals, mining interests, and the Salmon-Challis National Forest. A self-guided tour is accessible to the public from Memorial Day through Labor Day.
