= Quadra FNX Mining =

Canadian mining company

Quadra FNX Mining Ltd
- Type: Public
- Traded as: TSX: QUX
- Industry: Nickel-Copper Mines
- Founded: 15 May, 2002
- Defunct: 5 March, 2012
- Fate: Acquired by KGHM Polska Miedz S.A.
- Headquarters: Vancouver, British Columbia, Canada
- Key people: Paul Blythe
- Number of employees: 81 (2008)

Quadra FNX Mining Ltd was a Vancouver, British Columbia-based company that produced copper, nickel, platinum, palladium, gold, cobalt, and molybdenum with operations in Nevada, Arizona, Chile, Greenland, and the Sudbury Basin, Ontario, Canada.

Quadra FNX Mining was created by a merger of Quadra Mining Ltd. and FNX Mining Company Inc. in 2010. The company was taken over by KGHM Polska Miedz S.A. in 2012.

== Quadra history ==
Quadra Resources Ltd. was incorporated in Vancouver, British Columbia on 15 May, 2002. The Company changed its name from Quadra Resources Ltd. to Quadra Mining Ltd. on 9 January, 2003.

On 8 April, 2004, Quadra Mining Ltd. completed an initial public offering raising approximately $145 million. Quadra used a portion of the proceeds of the offering to acquire the interest in the Robinson Mine located near Ely, Nevada.

== FNX history ==
FNX Mining Company Inc. was incorporated in Toronto, Ontario on 26 June, 1984.

A former Inco geologist, Terry MacGibbon, took over the reins of FNX — then called Fort Knox Resources — in 1997 and renamed the company to FNX Mining Company Inc.

== Merger and KGHM Takeover ==
On 23 March 2010, FNX Mining Company Inc. announced that it agreed to be acquired by Vancouver-based Quadra Mining, pending ratification by the shareholders of both companies. Quadra operates the Robinson and Carlota copper mines in the US, and the Franke copper mining in Chile.

On 6 December 2011, Polish miner, KGHM Polska Miedz S.A. (World's 9th largest producer of copper) has agreed to buy Quadra FNX Mining Ltd. for approximately C$2.9 bn. Each shareholder of Quadra FNX Mining received C$15.00 for each commonly held share. The internal funds of KGHM was used to secure the purchase with hopes of an expedient return on investment; through current project in Arizona, Nevada, Chile and Ontario, Canada.

The takeover of Quadra by KGHM was completed on 5 March, 2012.
