= Shafter, Nevada =

- Ghost Town
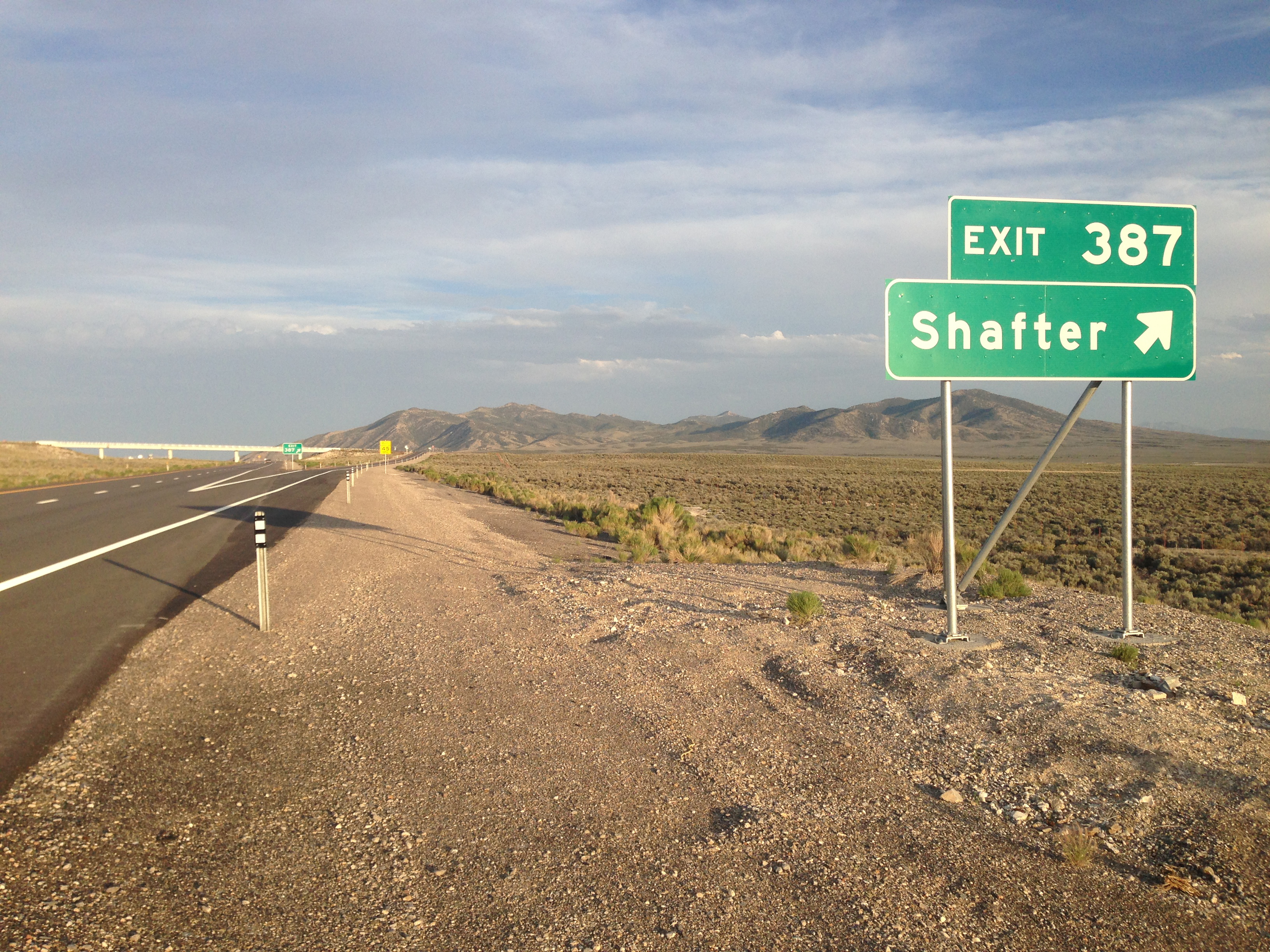

- Location within the state of Nevada Shafter (the United States)
- Coordinates: 40°51′17″N 114°26′41″W
- Country: United States
- State: Nevada
- County: Elko
- Elevation: 5,594 ft (1,705 m)
- Time zone: UTC-8 (Pacific (PST))
  - Summer (DST): UTC-7 (PDT)
- GNIS feature ID: 847479

Shafter is a ghost town in Elko County, Nevada, United States.

== History ==
Shafter was founded in 1906 as a siding for the Nevada Northern Railway. Before being called Shafter, it was known as Bews. It was renamed Shafter in 1907, when the Western Pacific Railroad's Feather River Route arrived. The community was named after William Rufus Shafter, a prominent U.S. officer during the Spanish–American War. Around 40 inhabitants lived there. The town had a school, which closed in 1932, and a post office, which shut in 1959, signalling the death of the town. Today, only foundations of buildings remain.

The population was 46 in 1940.

Although the town is abandoned, this particular section of the railroad is still called the Shafter Subdivision.
