= Mansfeld Mining Railway =

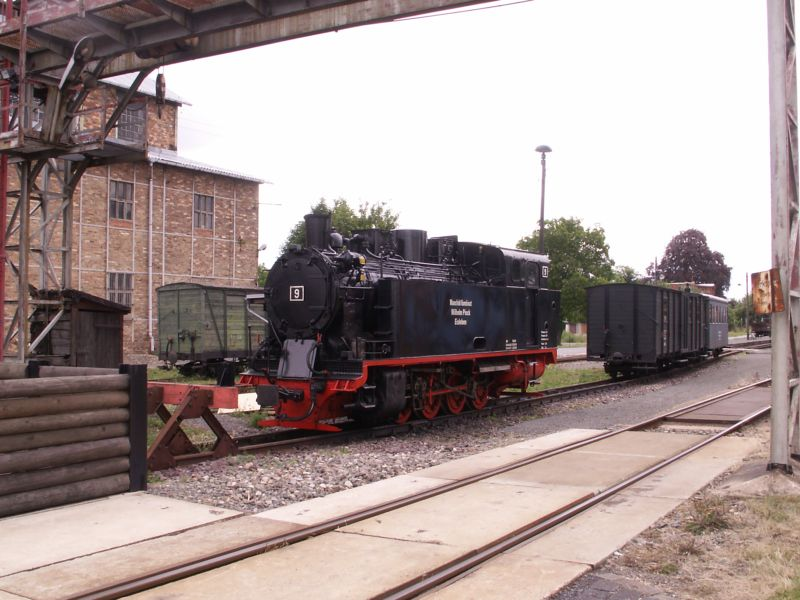
- Locomotive No.9 at Benndorf

Overview
- Locale: Saxony-Anhalt, Germany
- Dates of operation: 1885–

Technical
- Track gauge: 750 mm (2 ft 5 1/2 in)
- Length: 11 km (6.8 mi)

The Mansfelder Bergwerksbahn is an 11-kilometre (6.8 mi) long 750 mm (2 ft 5 1/2 in) gauge heritage railway in Saxony-Anhalt, Germany.

== History ==
Copper ore has been mined around Mansfeld since 1199. In 1885, a 5.5 kilometres (3.4 mi) long railway opened linking the Glückhilf mine at Welfesholz and the Kupferkammer smeltery at Hettstedt. At first it carried only goods, but in 1882 began carrying miners. In 1883, workshops were established at Klostermansfeld.

By 1930, the railway extended to 95 kilometres (59 mi) of track, serving 13 copper mines and two smelteries, and had interchanges with two station served by standard gauge trains. Transporter wagons were introduced in the 1930s, as well as air brakes on rolling stock. Traffic on the Mansfelder Bergwerksbahn reached its peak in 1955. The first diesel locomotives were introduced in 1961. In 1965, steam locomotive No. 10 became the first narrow gauge locomotive in Germany converted to heavy oil fuel.

Between 1964 and 1969, the last copper mines at Eisleben and Hettstedt were closed. Carriage of passengers ceased in 1970. The smeltery in Eisleben closed in 1972, and the track between Eisleben and Helbra was lifted some years later. In 1989, the smeltery and power station at Helbra closed, and with it the railway.

== Preservation ==
In 1990, the railway between Hettstedt and Klostermansfeld reopened as a heritage railway. By 1993, all other lines had been lifted. In 1994, the remaining line was transferred to the Mansfelder Bergwerksbahn e.V. It is maintained as part of Germany's industrial and mining heritage.

== See also ==
- Otavi Mining and Railway Company: a copper ore railway in German South West Africa
- White Knob Copper Electric Railway: a copper ore railway in the United States
- BHP Nevada Railroad: a copper ore railway in the United States
