= Robinson Mine =

Mine in White Pine County, Nevada, United States

- Location in Nevada
- Location: White Pine County, Nevada, United States; 39°15′33″N 114°58′24″W
- Products: Copper, Gold, Molybdenum
- Opened: 1908
- Company: KGHM Polska Miedź
- Website: Robinson Mine webpage
- Acquired: 2012

The Robinson Mine is a porphyry copper deposit located at Ruth, White Pine County, Nevada, in the Egan Range, 4 miles (6.4 km) west of Ely. The mine comprises three large open pits: Liberty, Tripp-Veteran and Ruth. The ore is extracted using conventional surface methods, and is then processed into a copper-gold concentrate, and a molybdenum concentrate in a concentrating plant. Since 2012 the mine has been owned and operated by Polish copper miner KGHM Polska Miedź

Large-scale copper mining began in the district in 1907 and, with some hiatuses and several changes of ownership, continues in 2019. Production from 1908 to 1978 was more than 4 billion pounds (1.5 million tonnes) of copper and 2,700,000 troy ounces (84 t) of gold, and 2018 annual production of 106 million pounds (48,000 tonnes) of copper and 37,100 troy ounces (1.15 t) of gold. Published ore reserves at Robinson as of end of 2017 were 565,400,000 pounds (256,500 t) of copper. Current plans are for the mine to operate until 2022 before closure and reclamation.

== History and current operations ==
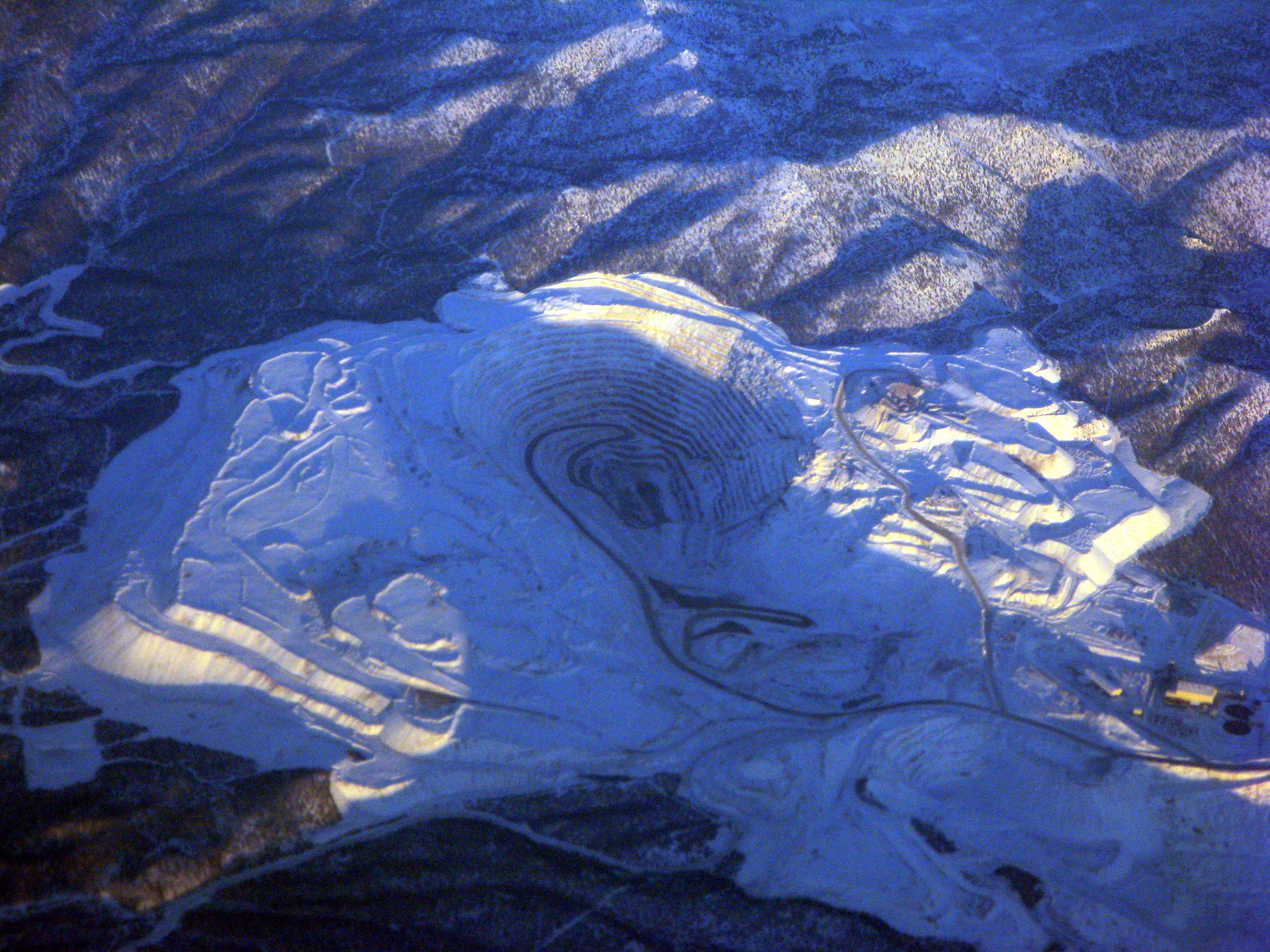
Robinson Mine from the air, winter 2009.

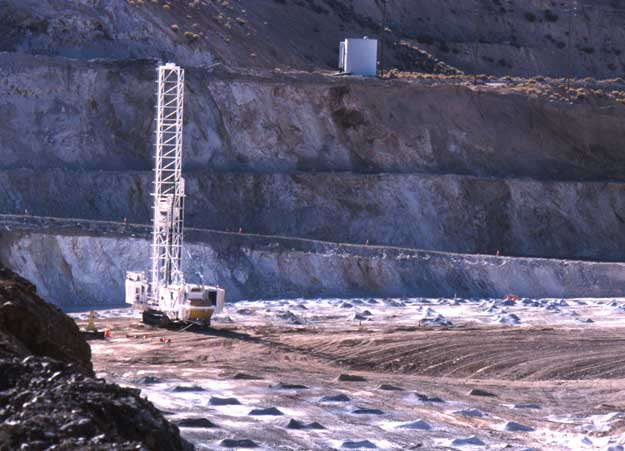
Drilling blast holes at the Robinson copper mine in 2004

Around 1868, prospector Thomas Robinson discovered gold and silver, along with widespread, low-grade copper, in what became the Robinson Mining District. From around 1892 to 1907, several gold mines were opened, but none were successful. Around 1907, interest turned towards copper.

Under Daniel C. Jackling, in 1905 Nevada Consolidated Copper Corporation (Nevada Con) began copper mining in the Veteran Mine. "The resulting mine was an impressive open-pit and satellite cave."

During World War I and until the Great Depression, Nevada Con employed some 1000 - 1200 men in their mines. Mining ended around 1949. Future production would come from open-pit mining.

In late 1906, the Guggenheim interests acquired control of Nevada Con, as a part of their rapidly growing copper-mining business. In 1932, Nevada Con became a wholly owned subsidiary of Kennecott Copper, another Guggenheim-controlled company.

In September 1978, Kennecott closed its Nevada mines, and in 1983 the McGill smelter was also closed. Recorded production from 1908 to 1978 was more than 4 billion pounds of copper and 2.7 million ounces of gold.

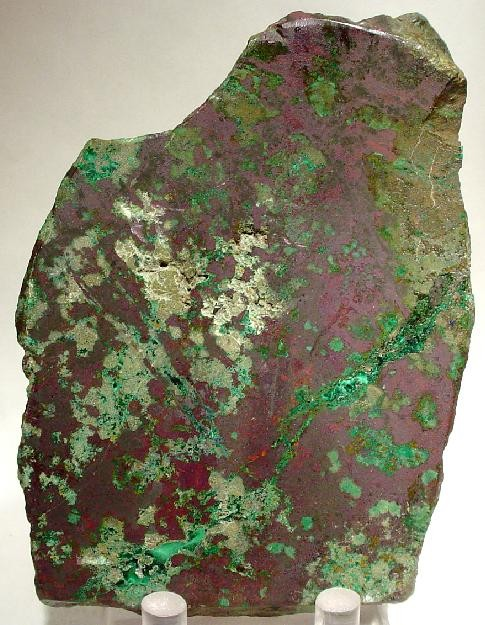
Malachite and cuprite in a high-grade copper ore specimen from the Robinson Mining District.

Magma Copper bought Robinson in 1991 and began work on reopening the mine in 1994. In 1996, BHP acquired Magma, and operated Robinson from 1996 to 1999. Magma/BHP invested around $480 million in the mine and plant. The mine was closed in 1999 due to low copper prices. Quadra Mining bought Robinson in 2004, and reopened the mine later that year. Since 2005, production has averaged about 125 million pounds of copper per year. In 2010, Robinson produced 109 million pounds of copper and 73,000 ounces of gold. In 2012, Quadra was acquired by KGHM Polska Miedź, a large Polish copper producer. As of December 2017, the Robinson Mine had 605 employees.

== Geology ==
Paleozoic limestones, shales and sandstones were intruded in the Cretaceous by a quartz monzonite porphyry. This intrusion metamorphosed the surrounding sediments creating a tactite zone in the altered limestone up to 150 meters away, producing porphyry ores with traces of gold. Chalcopyrite is the primary ore mineral, which may be altered to chalcocite.

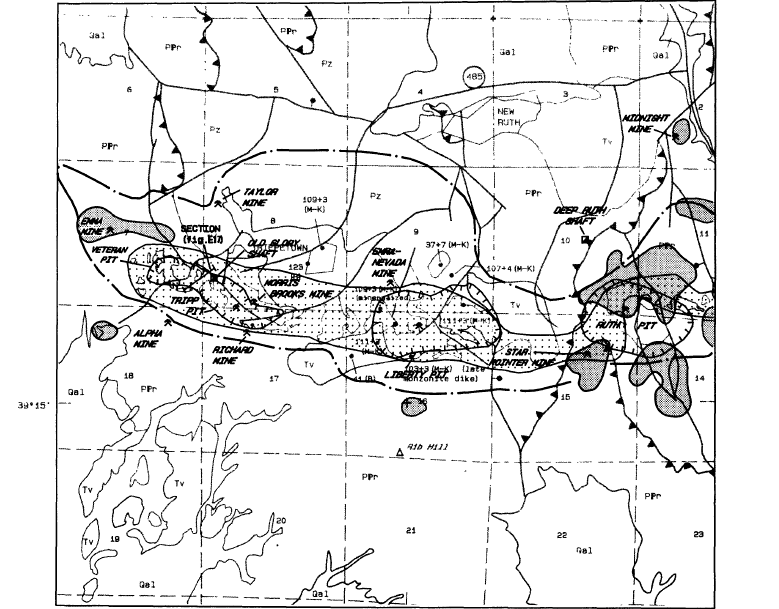
Geology map of the Ruth area showing alteration zone, copper and gold mineralized areas, and the Veteran, Trapp, Liberty and Ruth open pits (l-r)

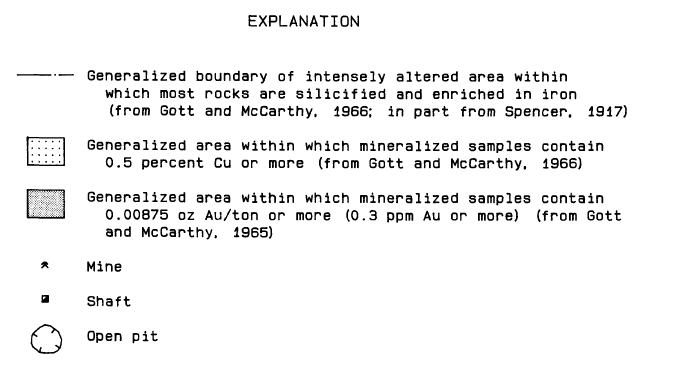
Key: Alteration and mineralization areas

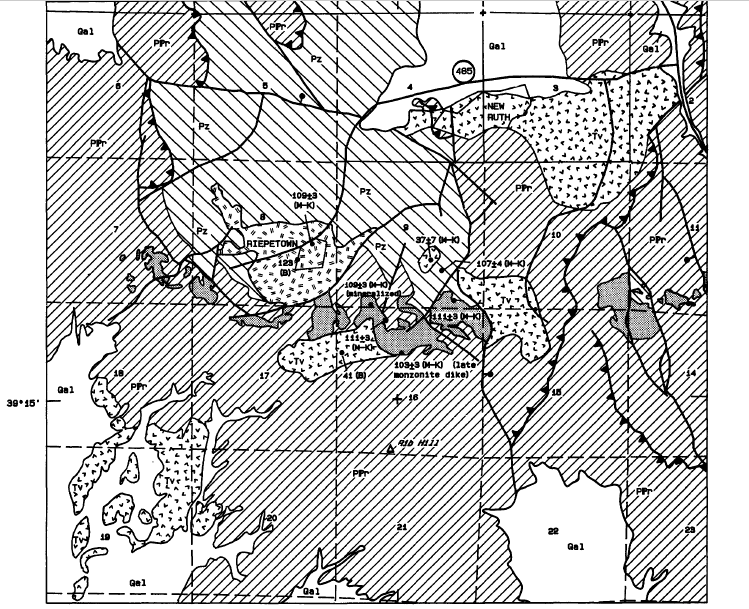
Solid geology map of the Ruth area

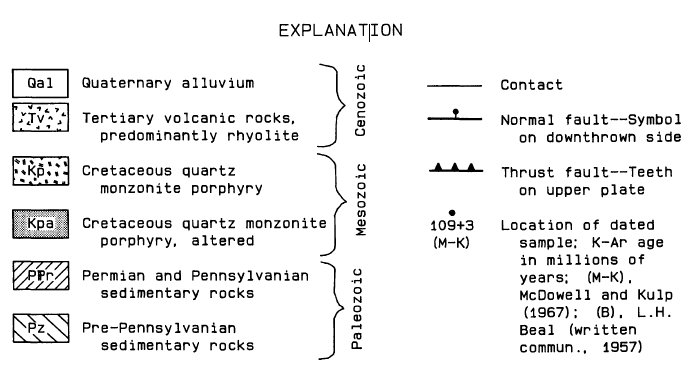
Key: Solid geology map

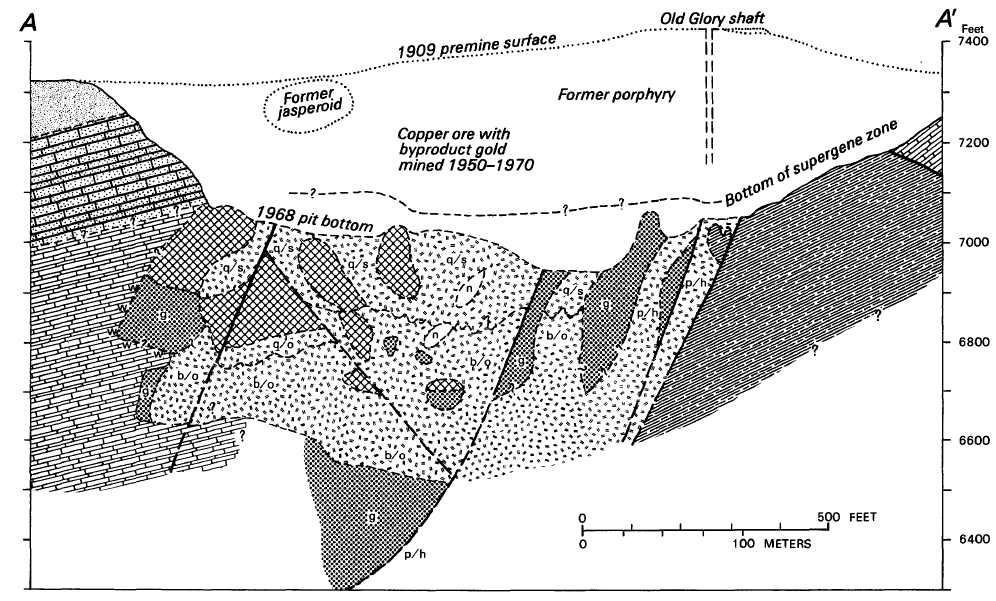
Ruth pit cross section

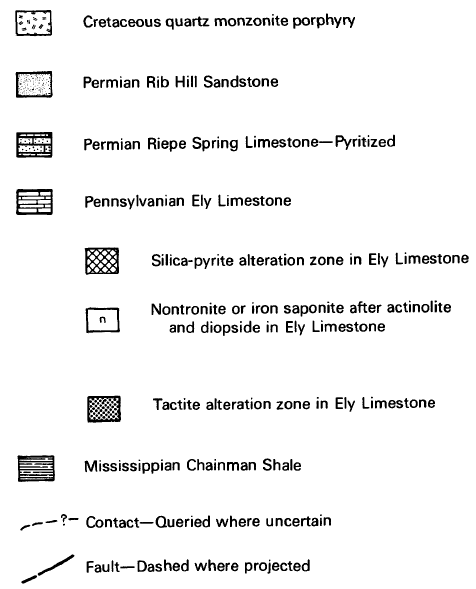
Key: Ruth pit cross section
