= Wipper-Eine =

Coordinates: 51°42′N 11°28′E

Wipper-Eine was a Verwaltungsgemeinschaft ("collective municipality") in the Mansfeld-Südharz district, in Saxony-Anhalt, Germany. It was situated between Hettstedt and Aschersleben. It was named after the river Wipper and its tributary Eine. The seat of the Verwaltungsgemeinschaft was in Quenstedt.

It was disbanded on 1 January 2010.

The Verwaltungsgemeinschaft Wipper-Eine consisted of the following municipalities:

1. Alterode
2. Arnstedt
3. Bräunrode
4. Greifenhagen
5. Harkerode
6. Quenstedt
7. Sandersleben
8. Stangerode
9. Sylda
10. Ulzigerode
11. Welbsleben
12. Wiederstedt
