= Arnstein, Saxony-Anhalt =

Arnstein
- Town
- Location of Arnstein within Mansfeld-Südharz district
- Interactive map of Arnstein
- Location within Germany Location within Saxony-Anhalt
- Coordinates: 51°41′N 11°28′E
- Country: Germany
- State: Saxony-Anhalt
- District: Mansfeld-Südharz

Government
  - Mayor (2023–30): Janet Klaus (SPD)

Area
  - Total: 121.69 km^{2} (46.98 sq mi)

Population (2025-12-31)
  - Total: 6,046
  - Density: 49.68/km^{2} (128.7/sq mi)
- Time zone: UTC+01:00 (CET)
  - Summer (DST): UTC+02:00 (CEST)
- Postal codes: 06333 (Arnstedt, Bräunrode, Greifenhagen, Quenstedt, Sylda, Welbsleben, Wiederstedt), 06456 (Sandersleben), 06543 (Alterode, Harkerode, Stangerode, Ulzigerode)
- Dialling codes: 03473, 03476, 034742, 034781, 034785
- Vehicle registration: MSH, EIL, HET, ML, SGH
- Website: arnstein-harz.de

Arnstein (German pronunciation: [ˈaʁnʃtaɪn]) is a town in the Mansfeld-Südharz district, Saxony-Anhalt, Germany. It was formed on 1 January 2010 by the voluntary merger of twelve former municipalities. Its mayor is Frank Sehnert.

== Geography ==
=== Subdivisions ===
The town of Arnstein is divided into twelve localities (Ortschaften), corresponding to the twelve former municipalities which now constitute the town. Some of the localities consist of a number of Ortsteile (local parts).

Locality	Population	Parts	
Alterode	517	Alterode	Localities of Arnstein
Arnstedt	552	Arnstedt	Localities of Arnstein
Bräunrode	447	Bräunrode, Friedrichrode, Willerode	Localities of Arnstein
Greifenhagen	272	Greifenhagen	Localities of Arnstein
Harkerode	333	Harkerode	Localities of Arnstein
Quenstedt	820	Pfersdorf, Quenstedt	Localities of Arnstein
Sandersleben	1901	Roda, Sandersleben	Localities of Arnstein
Stangerode	351	Stangerode	Localities of Arnstein
Sylda	512	Sylda	Localities of Arnstein
Ulzigerode	202	Ulzigerode	Localities of Arnstein
Welbsleben	712	Welbsleben	Localities of Arnstein
Wiederstedt	1074	Wiederstedt	Localities of Arnstein

== History ==
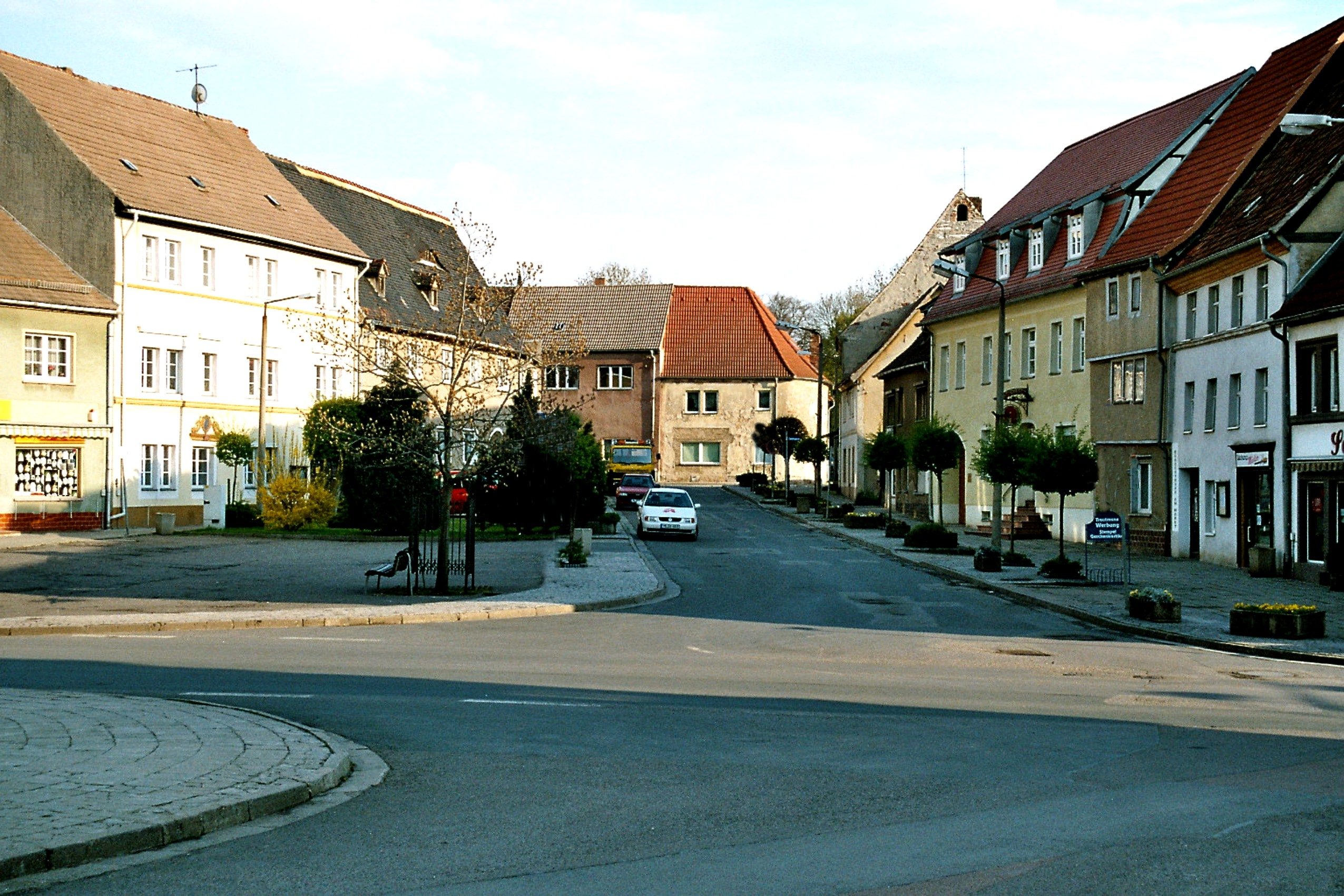
Town square of Sandersleben

Arnstein was created on 1 January 2010 by the voluntary merger of twelve former municipalities in the Mansfeld-Südharz district. Arnstein was ruled by the House of Arnstein. The new unified entity took its name from the old administrative unit of Amt Arnstein in the County of Mansfeld and the Arnstein Castle.

== Notable people ==
- Christian August Friedrich Garcke: botanist and scientific author
- Andreas Gottlieb Hoffmann: Protestant theologian and Orientalist
- Georg Philipp Friedrich Freiherr von Hardenberg: aristocrat, poet, author, mystic and philosopher of Early German Romanticism known by pen name "Novalis"
