= Eine (river) =

River in Germany

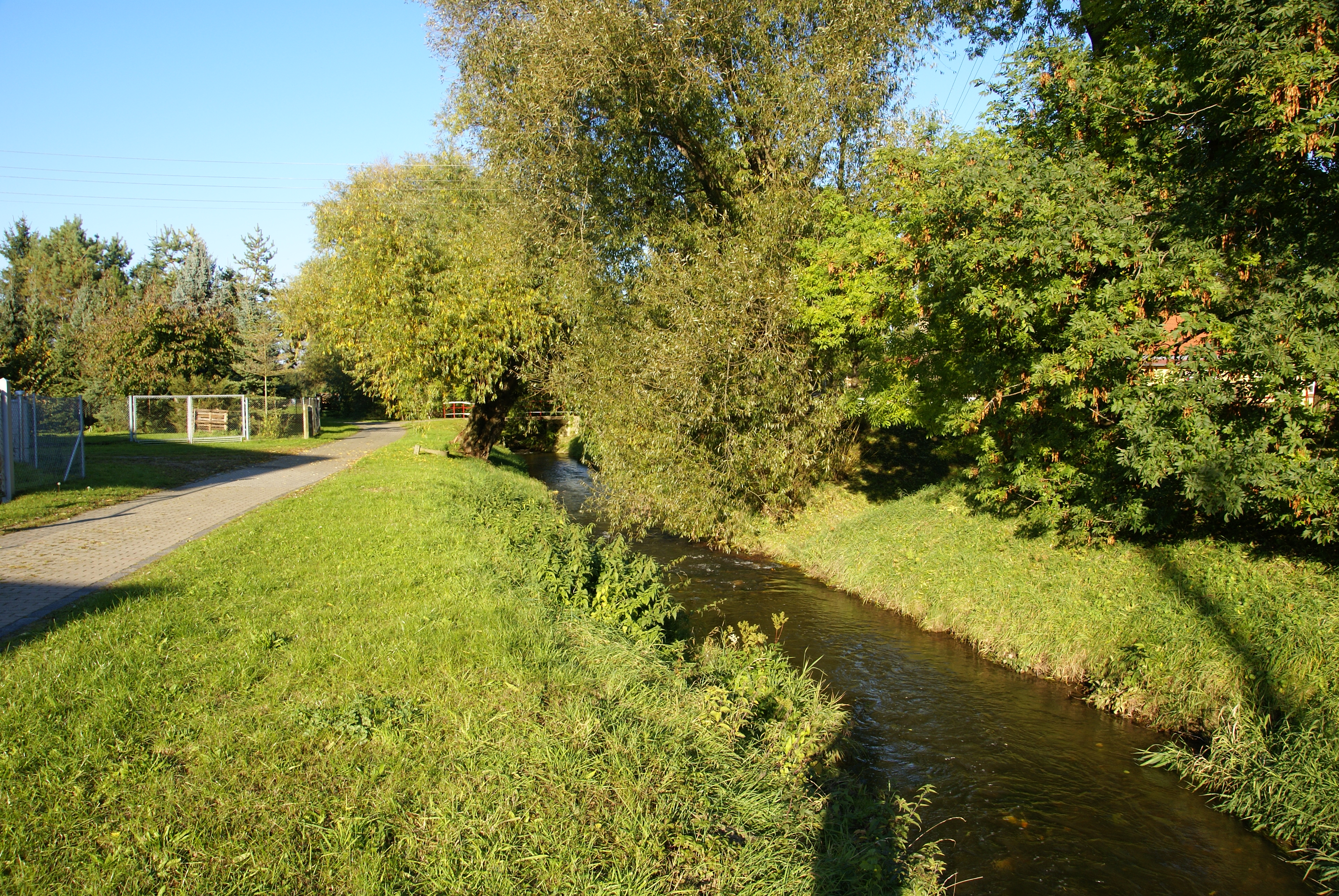
- The Eine in Welbsleben

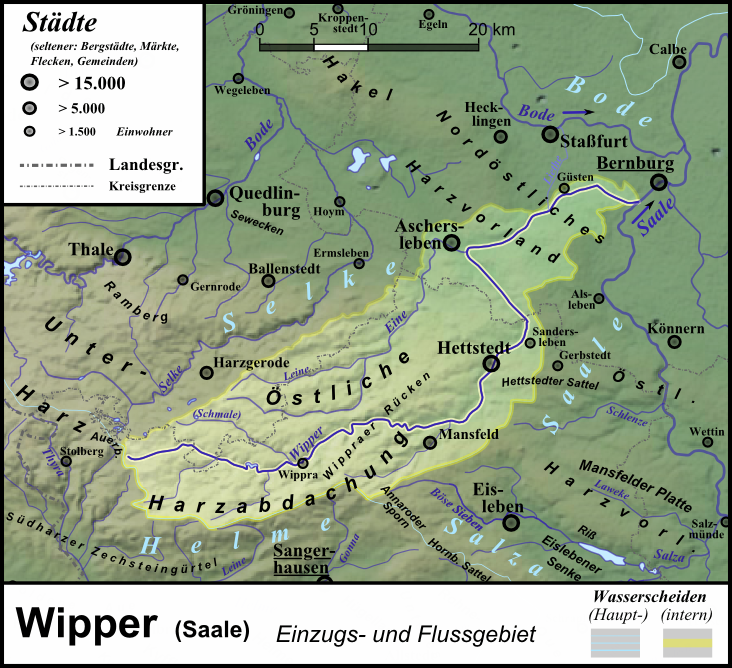
- The catchment of the Wipper with the Eine, its most important tributary, in the northwest

Location
- Location: Saxony-Anhalt

Physical characteristics
- Source
  - location: southeast of Harzgerode
  - coordinates: 51°37′17.83″N 11°09′34.34″E
  - elevation: 420 m above sea level (NN)
- Mouth
  - location: southeast of Aschersleben
  - coordinates: 51°44′50″N 11°27′14″E
  - elevation: 93.7 m above sea level (NN)
- Length: 40 km

Basin features
- Progression: Wipper → Saale → Elbe → North Sea
- River system: Elbe

The Eine (German pronunciation: [ˈaɪnə]) is a river, just under 40 kilometres (25 mi) long in the German state of Saxony-Anhalt, which rises southeast of Harzgerode in the Harz mountains at 420 metres (1,380 ft) above sea level.

The Eine flows north of the B 242 federal road to Friedrichsrode in an easterly direction and then swings northeast into the Harz Foreland. The river channel runs through Alterode, Welbsleben, and Westdorf to Aschersleben. The tributaries of the Eine are the Wiebeck, the Leine, the Schwennecke, the Mukarehne and the Langetalbach. Southeast of Aschersleben the Eine discharges into the Wipper at an elevation of 93.7 metres (307 ft) above sea level.

The Eine gives its name to the Wipper-Eine collective municipality.

== See also ==
- List of rivers of Saxony-Anhalt
