= Allgemeine Encyclopädie der Wissenschaften und Künste =

19th-century German encyclopaedia

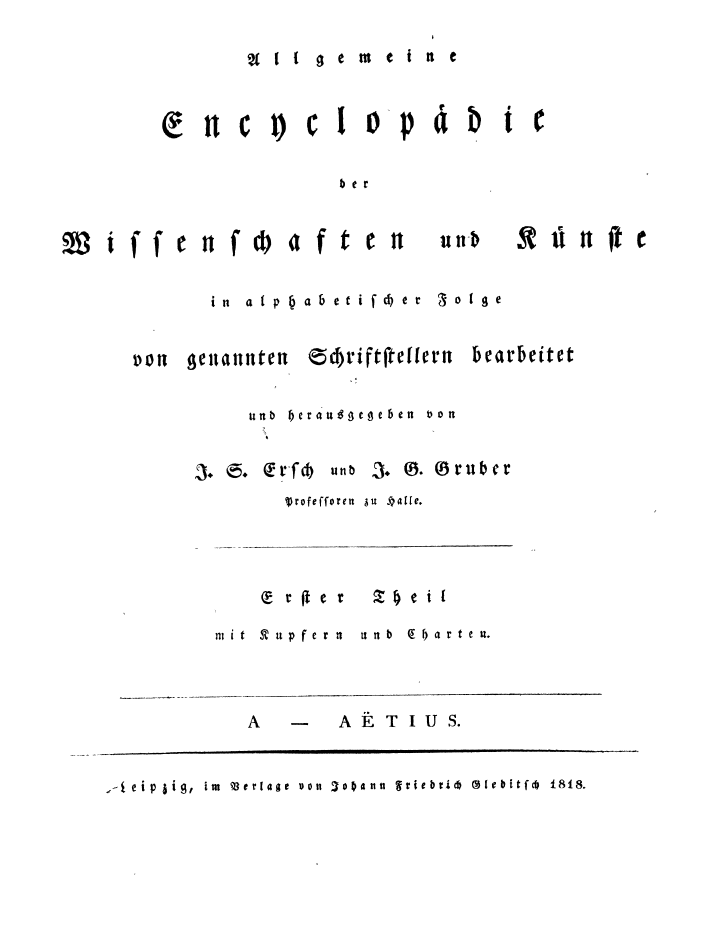
Title page of volume 1

The Allgemeine Encyclopädie der Wissenschaften und Künste (lit. 'Universal Encyclopaedia of Sciences and Arts') was a 19th-century German encyclopaedia published by Johann Samuel Ersch and Johann Gottfried Gruber, therefore also known as the Ersch-Gruber. One of the most ambitious encyclopaedia projects ever, it remains uncompleted.

It was designed and begun in 1813 by Professor Ersch to satisfy the wants of Germans, only in part supplied by foreign works. It was stopped by the Napoleonic Wars until 1816, when Professor Gottlieb Hufeland joined, but he died on 25 November 1817, while the specimen part was at press. The first volume appeared in Leipzig in 1818. The editors of the different sections at various times were some of the best-known men of learning in Germany, including Gruber, Moritz Hermann Eduard Meier, Hermann Brockhaus, W. Müller and Andreas Gottlieb Hoffmann of Jena. Naturalist Eduard Poeppig wrote most of the articles on the Americas. All articles bear the authors' names, and those not ready in time were placed at the end of their letter.

The work is divided into three sections:

1. A–G (99 volumes published, complete) :
2. H–N (only the first 43 volumes published, through Ligatur)
3. O–Z (only the first 25 volumes published, through Phyxios)

From its beginning through 1830, the Encyclopädie was published at Leipzig by Johan Friedrich Gleditsch. From 1831 until publication ceased in 1889, the Encyclopädie was published by Friedrich Arnold Brockhaus, also of Leipzig. Gleditsch published volumes 1 through 21 of the first section; volumes 1 through 7 of the second, but only the first volume of the third section. Brockhaus published the remaining volumes through 1889. By 1889, when the project was abandoned, the Encyclopädie had reached 167 volumes. The article about Greece alone covered 3,668 pages, spanning eight volumes.

== Sources ==
- Chisholm, Hugh, ed. (1911). "Encyclopaedia s.v. Allgemeine Encyklopädie der Wissenschaften und Künste". Encyclopædia Britannica. Vol. 9 (11th ed.). Cambridge University Press. p. 381.
- Collison, Robert (1964). Encyclopaedias: Their History throughout the Ages. New York: Hafner Publishing Company.
- Wilson, J. G.; Fiske, J., eds. (1900). "Poeppig, Eduard" . Appletons' Cyclopædia of American Biography. New York: D. Appleton.
