= Sophie von Kühn =

German noblewoman

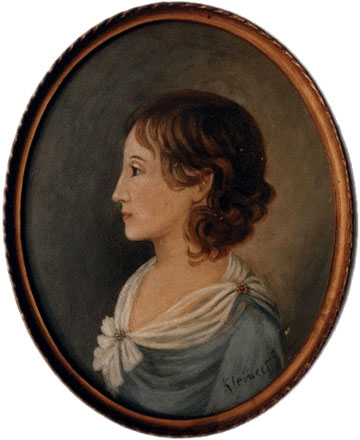

Christiane Wilhelmine Sophie von Kühn (17 March 1782 – 19 March 1797) was the love interest and eventual fiancée of the German Romantic poet and philosopher Friedrich von Hardenberg, known simply as Novalis. Her image famously appears in Novalis’ Hymns to the Night, a foundational text of the literary movement known as German Romanticism.

== Biography ==
Sophie was the stepdaughter of Captain Johann Rudolph von Rockenthien and the daughter of Sophie Wilhelmine von Kühn.

Although Novalis's love for Sophie has assumed mythic proportions, their time together was short and uneventful. The two met on 17 November 1794, at Grüningen Castle, when Novalis was twenty-two and Sophie was only twelve. About this, Novalis informed his brother Erasmus von Hardenberg in a letter that a "quarter of an hour" had decided his life. They became engaged on Sophie's thirteenth birthday 17 March 1795. Sophie fell ill in November 1795, apparently with hepatitis and pulmonary tuberculosis, and her illness continued until her death less than two years later. She seemingly recovered after her first bout of illness. Between May and July 1796, Sophie underwent three serious surgeries (at the time still performed without anesthesia) in Jena by Dr Johann Stark the Elder. She died at Grüningen Castle at the age of 15 in March 1797. The loss of Sophie brought about a deep period of mourning and suffering in Novalis' life. Even so, he became engaged to Julie von Charpentier in December 1798.

The depth of Sophie's love for Novalis is uncertain given her young age. Some of her diary entries, found in Wm. O’Brien's Novalis: Signs of Revolution, provide some insight into her relationship with Novalis:

1 March. Today Hartenberch visited again nothing happened.
11 March. We were alone today and nothing at all happened.
12 March. Today was like yesterday nothing at all happened.
13 March. Today was repentance day and Hartenb. was here.
14 March. Today Hartenber. was still here he got a letter from his brother.

Sophie had a sister, Caroline von Kühn, and a stepsister, Wilhelmine von Thümmel.

Ludwig Tieck's biography of Novalis describes Sophie, saying: "Even as a child, she gave an impression which--because it was so gracious and spiritually lovely--we must call superearthly or heavenly, while through this radiant and almost transparent countenance of hers we would be struck with the fear that it was too tender and delicately woven for this life, that it was death or immortality which looked at us so penetratingly from those shining eyes; and only too often a rapid withering motion turned our fear into an actual reality."

The relationship between von Kühn and Novalis is the focus of the 1995 novel The Blue Flower by Penelope Fitzgerald.
