= Andreas Gottlieb Hoffmann =

German Protestant theologian and Orientalist (1796–1864)

Andreas Gottlieb Hoffmann (13 April 1796 – 16 March 1864) was a German Protestant theologian and Orientalist born in Welbsleben. He was a leading authority on Syriac and Hebrew languages.

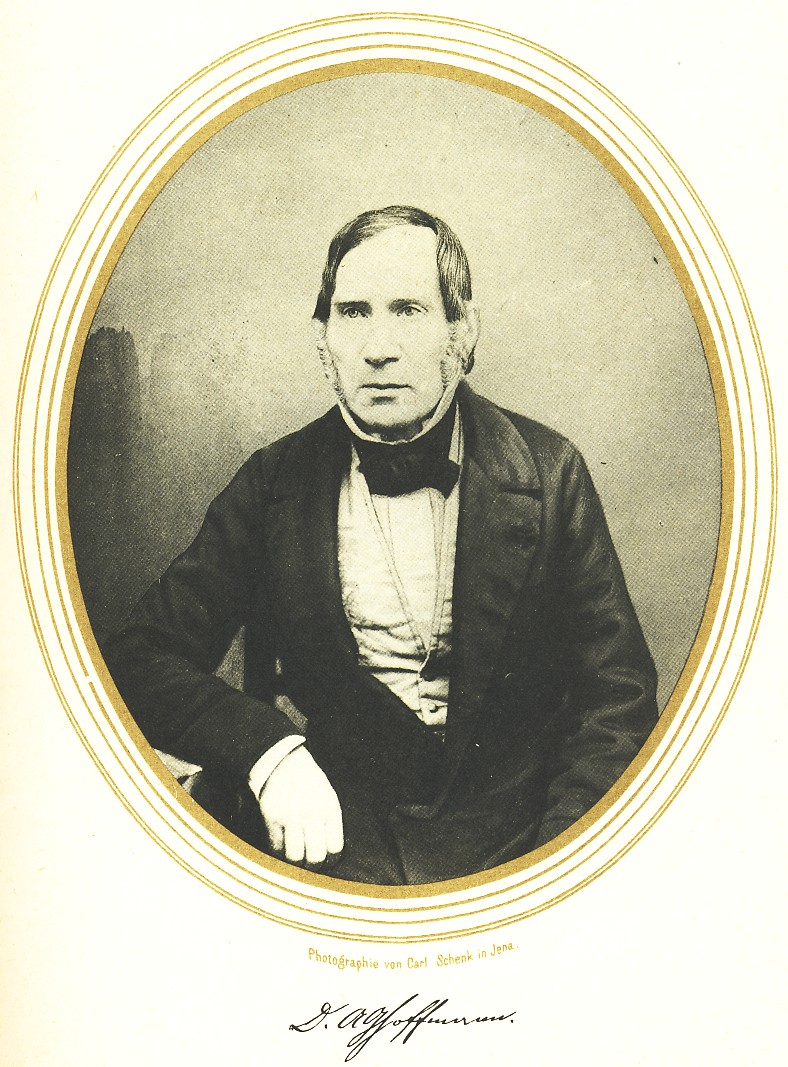
Andreas Gottlieb Hoffmann, 1858.

As a teenager he participated in the War of the Sixth Coalition as a member of the Second Prussian Foot Jäger Detachment. In 1820 he earned his doctorate at the University of Halle, where he studied theology as well as Syriac and Hebrew languages. At Halle he was a pupil of Wilhelm Gesenius (1786–1842). In 1823 he became an associate professor, and two years later a full professor at the University of Jena. At Jena he taught classes in church history, Old Testament exegesis and history of the Jewish people.

Hoffmann was the author of an acclaimed work on Syriac grammar (Grammatica syriaca) (1827), and was responsible for a German version of the Book of Enoch based on Richard Laurence's "Book of Enoch the Prophet" called Das Buch Henoch in vollständiger Uebersetzung. He made important contributions to the second section of the Ersch-Gruber Allgemeine Encyclopädie der Wissenschaften und Künste.

== Notable students ==
- Johann Gustav Stickel (1805–1896).
