= Novalis =

German aristocrat and polymath (1772–1801)

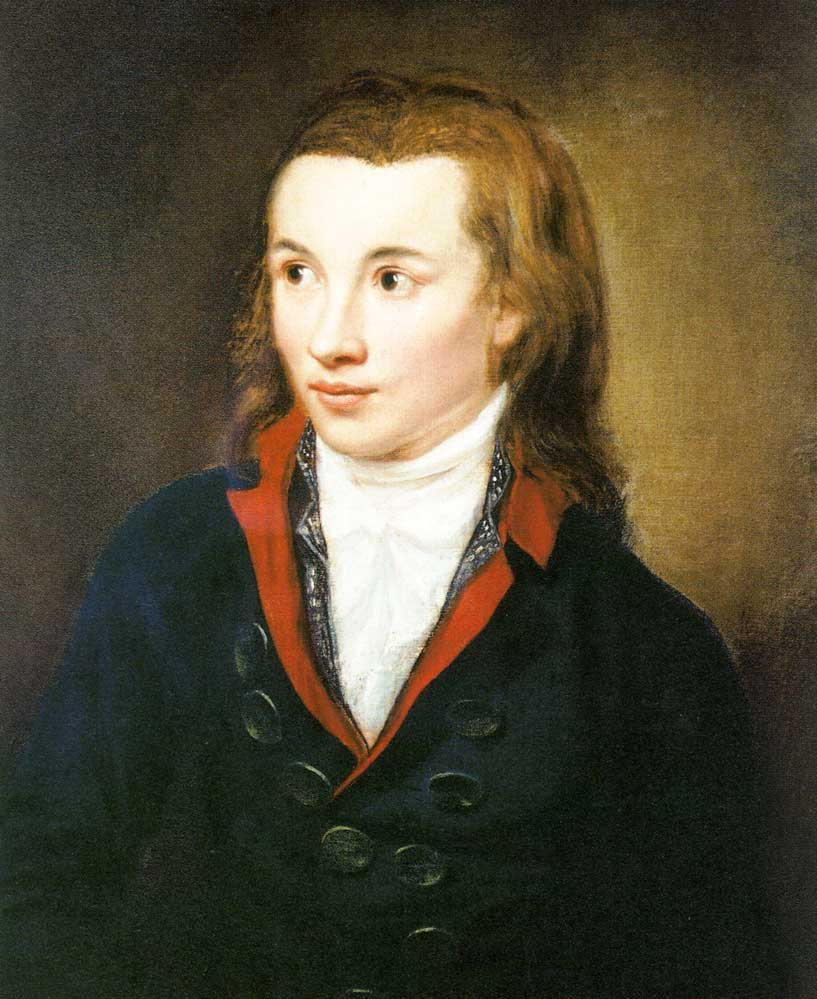
- Portrait, c. 1799
- Born: Georg Philipp Friedrich von Hardenberg; 2 May 1772; Wiederstedt, Electorate of Saxony, Holy Roman Empire
- Died: 25 March 1801 (aged 28); Weissenfels, Electorate of Saxony
- Education: University of Jena; Leipzig University; University of Wittenberg; Mining Academy of Freiberg
- Occupations: Writer, philosopher, poet, aristocrat, mystic, mineralogist, civil engineer
- Father: Heinrich Ulrich Erasmus von Hardenberg
- Relatives: Anton von Hardenberg; Carl von Hardenberg
- Writing career
- Period: 1791–1801
- Genres: Poetry; novels; fragments; speeches
- Subjects: Philosophy; natural science; religion; politics
- Movement: Jena Romanticism

Georg Philipp Friedrich von Hardenberg (2 May 1772 – 25 March 1801), better known by his pen name Novalis (/noʊˈvɑːlɪs/; German: [noˈvaːlɪs]), was a German aristocrat and polymath, who was a poet, novelist, philosopher and mystic. He is regarded as an influential figure in Jena Romanticism.

Novalis was born into a minor branch of the Hardenberg family in Electoral Saxony. He was the second of eleven children; his early household observed a strict Pietist faith. He studied law at the University of Jena, the University of Leipzig, and the University of Wittenberg. While at Jena, he published his first poem and befriended the playwright and fellow poet Friedrich Schiller. In Leipzig, he met Friedrich Schlegel, and the two became lifelong friends. Novalis completed his law degree in 1794 at the age of 22. He then worked as a legal assistant in Tennstedt immediately after graduating. There, he met Sophie von Kühn. The following year, Novalis and Sophie became secretly engaged. Sophie became severely ill soon after the engagement and died just after her 15th birthday. Sophie's early death had a lifelong impact on Novalis and his writing.

Novalis enrolled at the Freiberg University of Mining and Technology in 1797, where he studied a wide number of disciplines including electricity, medicine, chemistry, physics, mathematics, mineralogy and natural philosophy. He conversed with many of the formative figures of Early German Romanticism, including Goethe, Friedrich Schelling, Jean Paul and August Schlegel. After finishing his studies, Novalis served as a director of salt mines in Saxony and later in Thuringia. During this time, Novalis wrote major poetic and literary works, including Hymns to the Night. By August 1800, he fell terminally ill with a severe lung condition, rendering him unable to continue his professional duties. In 1800, he began showing signs of illness, which is thought to have been either tuberculosis or cystic fibrosis, and died on 25 March 1801 at the age of 28.

Novalis's early reputation as a romantic poet was primarily based on his literary works, which were published by his friends Friedrich Schlegel and Ludwig Tieck shortly after his death, in 1802. These works include the collection of poems, Hymns to the Night and Spiritual Hymns, and his unfinished novels, Heinrich von Ofterdingen and The Novices at Sais. Schlegel and Tieck published only a small sample of his philosophical and scientific writings.

The depth of Novalis's knowledge in fields like philosophy and natural science came to be more broadly appreciated with the more extensive publication of his notebooks in the twentieth century. Novalis was not only well read in his chosen disciplines; he also sought to integrate his knowledge with his art. This goal is evident in his use of the fragment, a literary form in which he wrote alongside Friedrich Schlegel, publishing his pieces in Schlegel's journal, Athenaeum. The fragment allowed him to synthesize poetry, philosophy, and science into a single art form that could be used to address a wide variety of topics. Just as Novalis's literary works have established his reputation as a poet, the notebooks and fragments have subsequently established his intellectual role in the formation of Early German Romanticism.

== Biography ==
=== Birth and early background ===
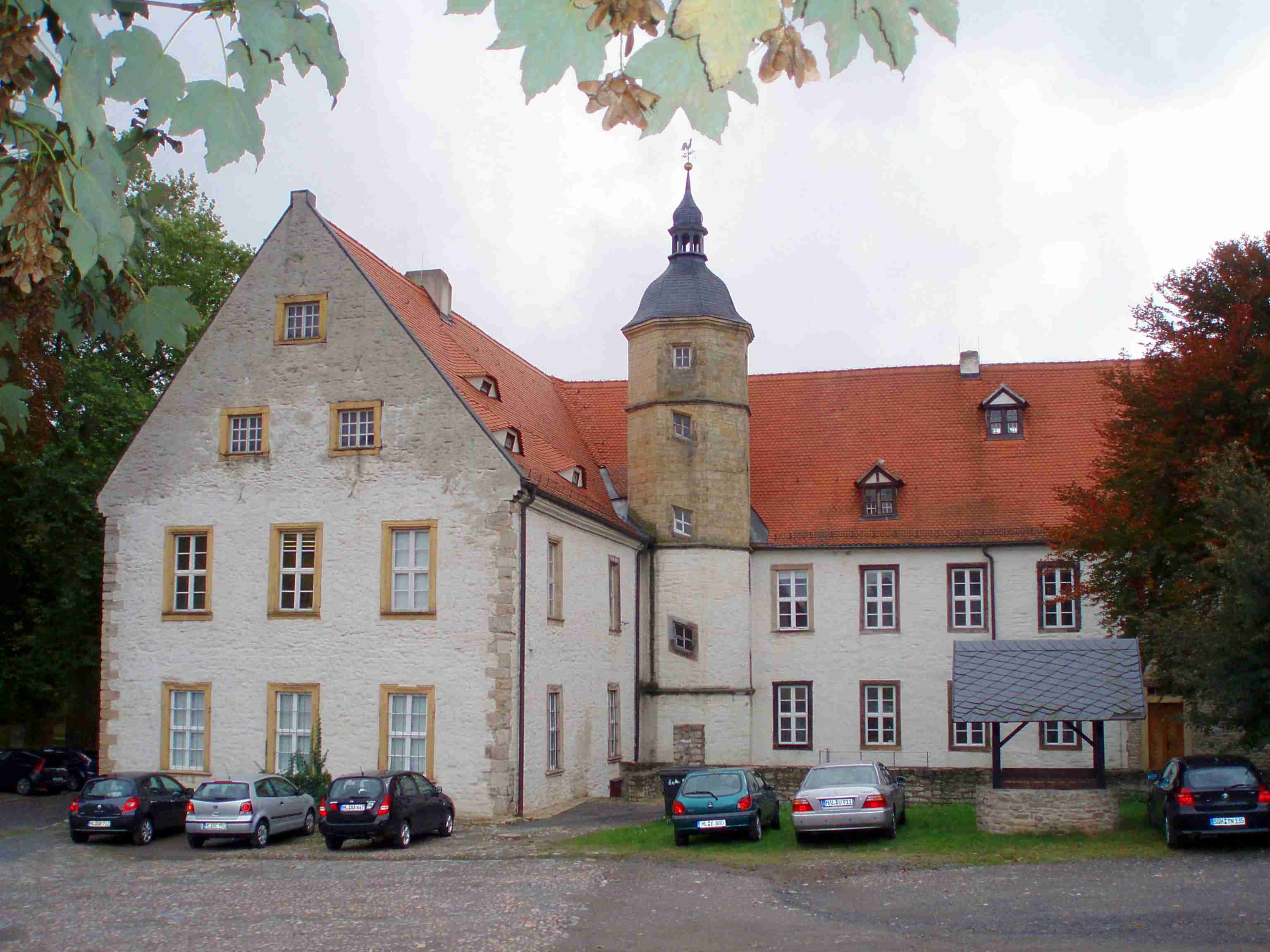
Oberwiederstedt castle

Novalis, baptized Georg Philipp Friedrich, was the Freiherr (Baron) von Hardenberg, born in 1772 at his family estate in the Electorate of Saxony, the Schloss Oberwiederstedt, in the village of Wiederstedt, which is now located in the present-day town of Arnstein. Hardenberg descended from ancient, Lower Saxon nobility. Novalis's father was Heinrich Ulrich Erasmus von Hardenberg (1738–1814), the estate owner and a salt-mine manager. His mother was Auguste Bernhardine (née von Böltzig) (1749–1818), who was Heinrich's second wife. Novalis was the second of eleven children. Although Novalis had an aristocratic pedigree, his family was not wealthy.

Novalis's early education was strongly influenced by Pietism. His father was a member of the Herrnhuter Unity of Brethren branch of the Moravian Church and maintained a strict pietist household. Until the age of nine, Novalis was taught by private tutors who were trained in pietist theology; subsequently, he attended a Herrnhut school in Neudietendorf for three years.

When he was twelve, Novalis was put under the charge of his uncle Gottlob Friedrich Wilhelm Freiherr von Hardenberg (1728-1800), Land commander of the Teutonic Order, who lived at his rural estate in Lucklum. Novalis's uncle introduced him to the late Rococo world, where Novalis was exposed to enlightenment ideas as well as the contemporary literature of his time, including the works of the French Encyclopedists, Goethe, Lessing and Shakespeare. At seventeen, Novalis attended the Martin Luther Gymnasium in Eisleben, near Weissenfels where his family had moved in 1785. At the gymnasium, he learned rhetoric and ancient literature.

=== Jena, Leipzig, Wittenberg: legal studies ===
Between 1790 and 1794, Novalis went to university to study law. He first attended the University of Jena. While there, he studied Immanuel Kant's philosophy under Karl Reinhold, and it was there that he first became acquainted with Fichte's philosophy. He also developed a close relationship with playwright and philosopher Schiller. Novalis attended Schiller's lectures on history and tended to Schiller when he was suffering from a particularly severe flare-up of his chronic tuberculosis. In 1791, he published his first work, a poem dedicated to Schiller, "Klagen eines Jünglings" ("Lament of a Youth"), in the magazine Der Neue Teutsche Merkur, an act that was partly responsible for Novalis's father withdrawing him from Jena and looking into another university where Novalis would attend more carefully to his studies. In the following year, Novalis's younger brother, Erasmus, enrolled at the University of Leipzig, and Novalis went with him to continue his legal studies. In 1792, he met the literary critic Friedrich Schlegel, the younger brother of August. Friedrich became one of Novalis's closest lifetime friends. A year later, Novalis matriculated to the University of Wittenberg where he completed his law degree.

=== Tennstedt: Relationship with Sophie von Kühn ===
After graduating from Wittenberg, Novalis moved to Tennstedt to work as an actuary for a district administrator, Cölestin August Just, who became both his friend and biographer. While working for Just, in November 1794 Novalis met the 12-year-old Sophie von Kühn, who at that time was considered old enough to receive suitors. He became infatuated with her on their first meeting, and the effect of this infatuation appeared to transform his personality. In 1795, two days before Sophie turned thirteen, they became secretly engaged. Later that year Sophie's parents gave their consent for the two to become engaged: Novalis's brother Erasmus supported the couple, but the rest of Novalis's family resisted agreeing to the engagement due to Sophie's unclear aristocratic pedigree.

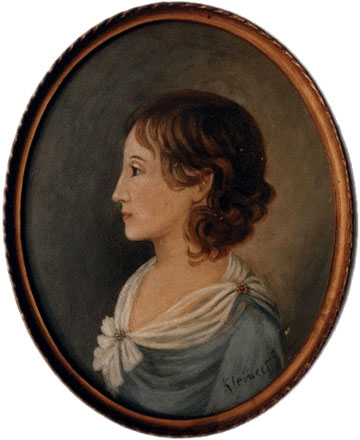
Sophie von Kühn

Novalis remained intellectually active during his employment at Tennstedt. It is possible that Novalis met Fichte, as well as the poet Friedrich Hölderlin, while visiting Jena in 1795. Between 1795 and 1796, he created six sets of manuscripts, posthumously collected under the title Fichte Studies, that primarily address Fichte's work but cover a range of philosophical topics. Novalis continued his philosophical studies in 1797, writing notebooks responding to the works of Kant, Frans Hemsterhuis, and Adolph Carl August von Eschenmayer.

Novalis's ongoing reflections upon Fichte's ideas, particularly those in the Wissenschaftslehre (Foundations of the Science of Knowledge) formed part of the foundation for his later philosophical and literary works: Novalis focused on Fichte's argument that the concept of identity assumes a tension between self (i.e., "I") and object (i.e., "not-I"). Novalis's critique of Fichte arose from Novalis's literary commitments: Novalis suggests that the tension between self and object that Fichte asserts is actually a tension between language and imagination. Later, Novalis would take his critique further, suggesting that identity is not the separation of subject and object, but a dynamic process of equal partners in mutual communication. Novalis's viewpoint is summarized in his aphorism "Statt Nicht-Ich -- Du!" ("Instead of 'not-I', you").

In the final months of 1795, Sophie began to suffer declining health due to a liver tumor that was thought to be caused by tuberculosis. As a result, she underwent liver surgery in Jena, which was performed without anesthesia. In January 1797, Novalis was appointed auditor to the salt works at Weissenfels. To earn a stable income for his intended marriage, he accepted the position and moved to Weissenfels to assume his duties. Sophie, on the other hand, stayed with her family. Sophie once more became gravely ill, during which time Novalis's parents finally relented and agreed to the couple's engagement. However, two days after her fifteenth birthday, Sophie died, while Novalis was still in Weissenfels. Four months later, Novalis's brother Erasmus, who had been diagnosed with tuberculosis, also died. The death of Sophie, as well as his younger brother, affected Novalis deeply. Their deaths catalyzed his more intensive commitment to poetic expression. Sophie's death also became the central inspiration for one of the few works Novalis published in his lifetime, Hymnen an die Nacht (Hymns to the Night).

=== Freiberg: Mining Academy ===
At the end of 1797, Novalis entered the Mining Academy of Freiberg in Saxony to become qualified as a member of the staff for the salt works at Weissenfels. His principal mentor at the academy was the geologist, Abraham Werner. While at the academy, Novalis immersed himself in a wide range of studies, including electricity, galvanism, alchemy, medicine, chemistry, physics, mathematics, and natural philosophy. He was also able to expand his intellectual social circle. On his way to Freiberg, he met Friedrich Schelling, and they later went on an art tour of Dresden together. He visited Goethe and Friedrich Schlegel's older brother, August, in Weimar and met the writer Jean Paul in Leipzig.

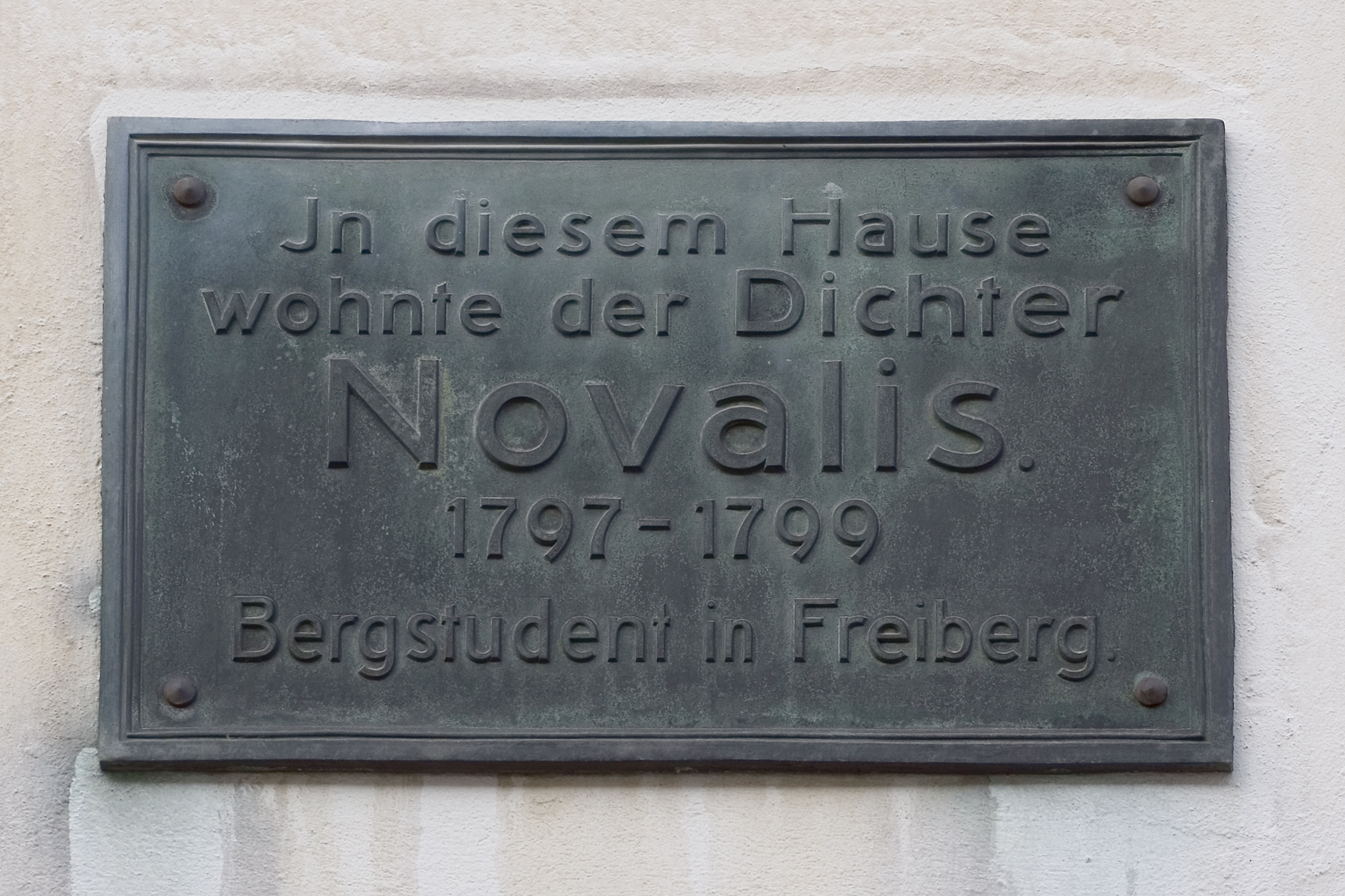
Novalis house plaque, Freiberg

In December 1798, Novalis became engaged for the second time. His fiancée was Julie von Charpentier, a daughter of Johann Friedrich Wilhelm von Charpentier, a mining official and professor at the Freiberg Mining Academy. Unlike his relationship with Sophie, Novalis's affection for Julie developed more gradually. He initially saw his affection for Julie as a more "earthly" passion compared to his "heavenly" passion for Sophie, though he gradually softened this distinction with time. Eventually his feelings for Julie became the subject of some of his poetry, including the Spiritual Songs written in the last years of his life. Novalis and Julie remained engaged until Novalis's death in 1801, and she tended him during his final illness.

In Freiberg, he remained active with his literary work. It was at this time that he began a collection of notes for a project to unite the separate sciences into a universal whole. In this collection, Das allgemeine Brouillon (Notes for a General Encyclopedia), Novalis began integrating his knowledge of natural science into his literary work. This integration can be seen in an unfinished novel he composed during this time, Die Lehrlinge zu Sais (The Novices at Sais), which incorporated natural history from his studies as well as ideas from his Fichte studies into a meditation on poetry and love as keys to understanding nature. More specifically, he began thinking about how to incorporate his recently acquired knowledge of mining into his philosophical and poetic worldview. In this respect, he shared a commonality with other German authors of the Romantic age by connecting his studies in mining, which was undergoing then the first steps to industrialization, with his literary work. This connection between his scientific interest in mining, philosophy and literature came to fruition later when he began composing his second unfinished novel, Heinrich von Ofterdingen.

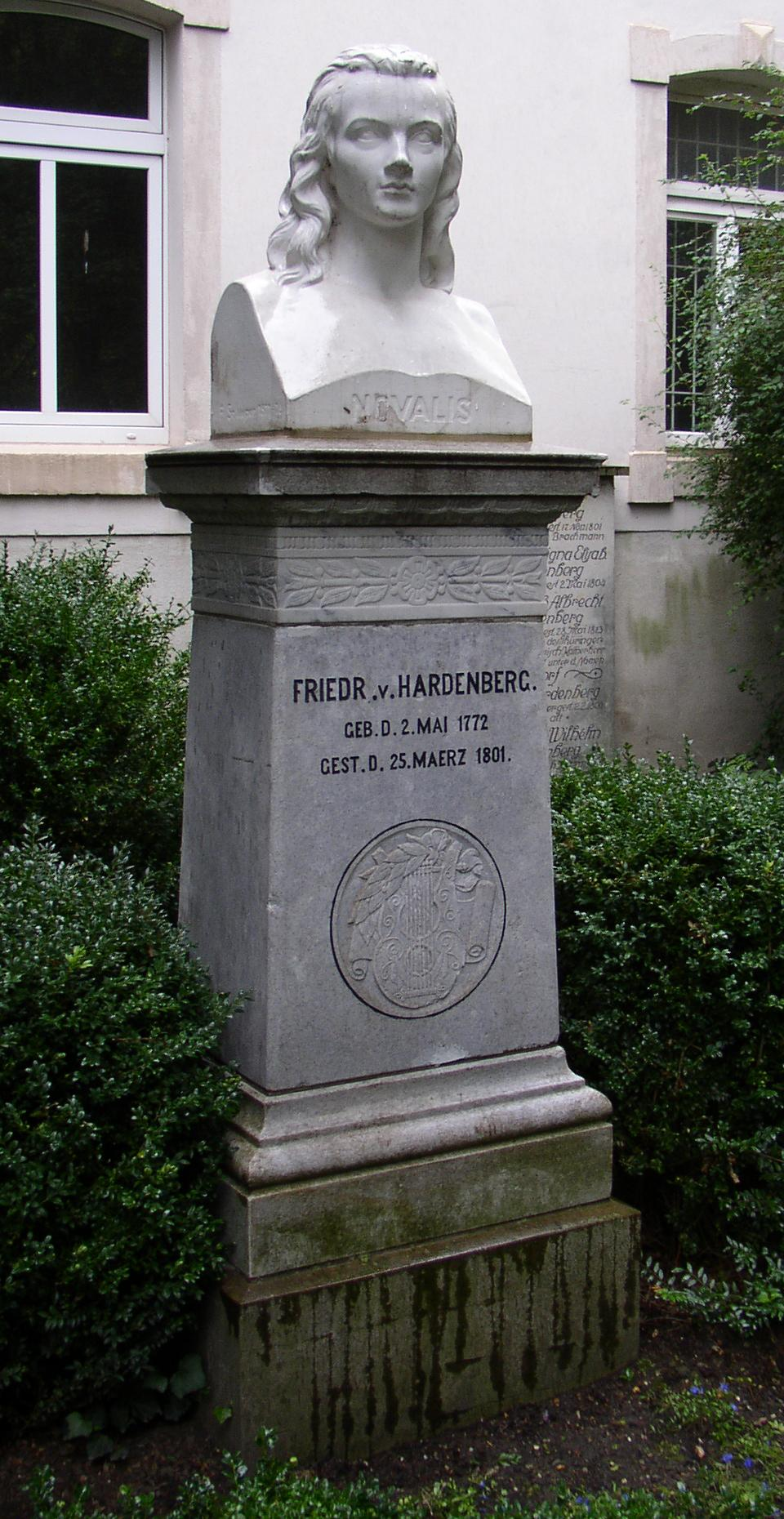
Novalis's grave in Weissenfels

Novalis also began to be noticed as a published author at this time. In 1798, Novalis's fragments appeared in the Schlegel brother's magazine, Athenaeum. These works included Blüthenstaub (Pollen), Glauben und Liebe oder der König und die Königin (Faith and Love or the King and the Queen), and Blumen (Flowers). The publication of Pollen saw the first appearance of his pen name, "Novalis". His choice of pen name was taken from his 13th-century ancestors who named themselves de Novali, after their settlement Grossenrode, which is called magna Novalis in Latin. Novalis can also be interpreted as "one who cultivates new land", which connotes the metaphoric role that Novalis saw for himself. This metaphoric sense of his pen name can be seen in the epigraph of Pollen, the first work he published as Novalis: "Friends, the soil is poor, we must scatter seed abundantly for even a moderate harvest".

=== Weissenfels: The final years ===
In 1799, Novalis returned from Freiberg to the management of salt mines in Weissenfels. By December, he became an assessor of the salt mines and a director, and at the end of 1800, the 28-year-old Novalis was appointed an Amtmann for the district of Thuringia, a position comparable to a contemporary magistrate.

While on a trip to Jena in the summer of 1799, Novalis met Ludwig Tieck, who became one of his closest friends and greatest intellectual influences in the last two years of his life. They became part of an informal social circle that formed around the Schlegel brothers, which has been come to be known as the Jena Romantics or Frühromantiker ("early romantics"). The interests of the Jena Romantics extended to philosophy as well as literature and aesthetics, and has been considered as a philosophical movement in its own right. Under the influence of Tieck, Novalis studied the works of the seventeenth-century mystic, Jakob Böhme, with whom he felt a strong affinity. He also became deeply engaged with the Platonic aesthetics of Hemsterhuis, as well as the writings of the theologian and philosopher Friedrich Schleiermacher. Schleiermacher's work inspired Novalis to write his essay, Christenheit oder Europa (Christianity or Europe), a call to return Europe to a cultural and social unity whose interpretation continues to be a source of controversy. During this time, he also wrote his poems known as Geistliche Lieder (Spiritual Songs) and began his novel Heinrich von Ofterdingen.

From August 1800, Novalis began to cough up blood. At the time, he was diagnosed with tuberculosis. However, recent research suggests that he may have suffered from cystic fibrosis, a genetic disorder that may have been responsible for the early death of many of his siblings, including his brother Erasmus. After a severe hemorrhage in November, he was temporarily moved to Dresden for medical reasons. In January, he requested to be with his parents in Weissenfels. He died there on 25 March 1801 at the age of twenty-eight. He was buried in Weissenfels's Alter Friedhof (Old Cemetery).

== Legacy ==
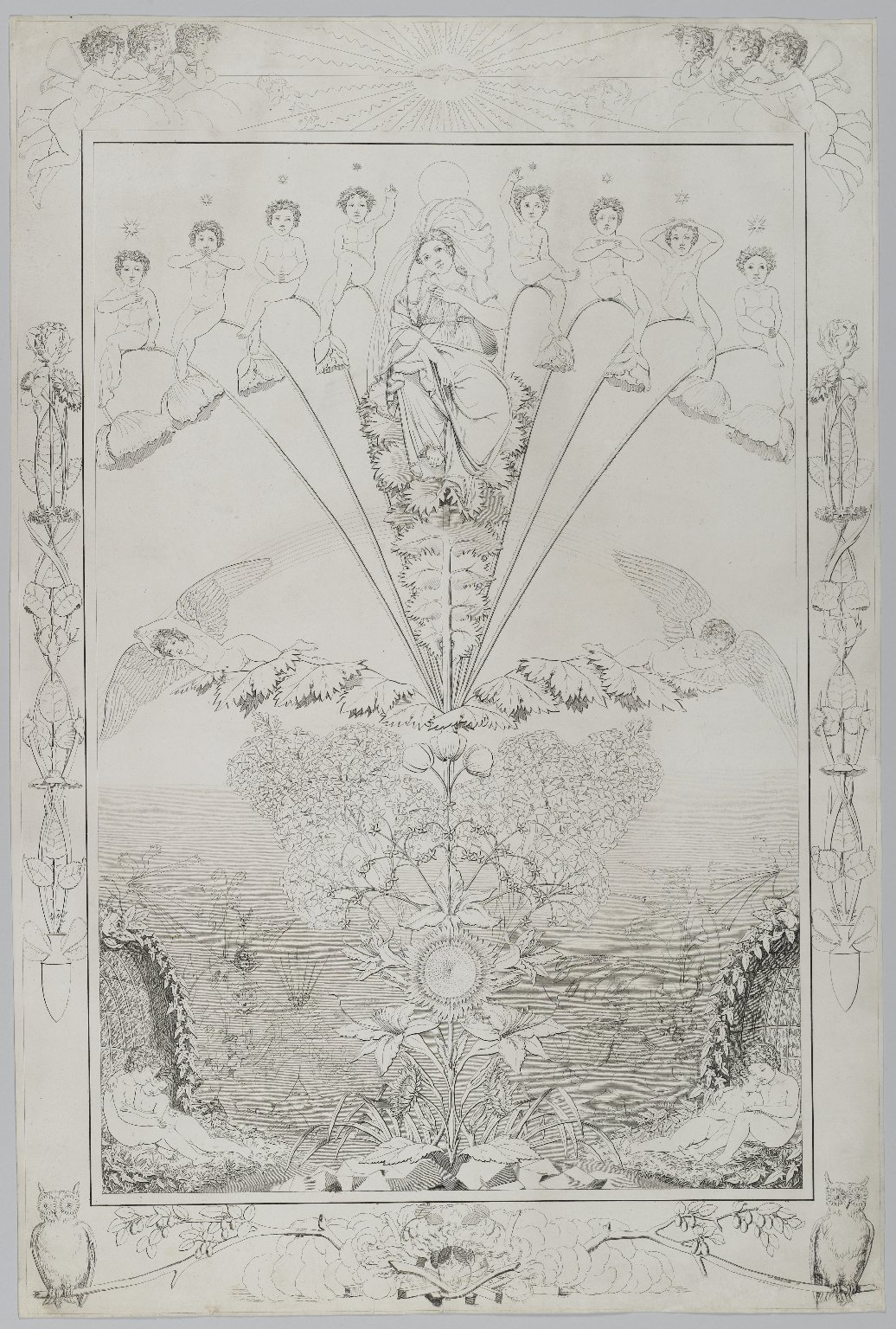
Philipp Otto Runge's pen-and-ink drawing Night (1803). Runge's Romantic use of allegorical symbolism was influenced by his reading of Novalis.

=== As romantic poet ===
When he died, Novalis had only published Pollen, Faith and Love, Blumen, and Hymns to the Night. Most of Novalis's writings, including his novels and philosophical works, were neither completed nor published in his lifetime. This problem continues to obscure a full appreciation of his work. His unfinished novels Heinrich von Ofterdingen and The Novices at Sais and numerous other poems and fragments were published posthumously by Ludwig Tieck and Friedrich Schlegel. However, their publication of Novalis's more philosophical fragments was disorganized and incomplete. A systematic and more comprehensive collection of Novalis's fragments from his notebooks was not available until the twentieth century.

During the nineteenth century, Novalis was primarily seen as a passionate love-struck poet who mourned the death of his beloved and yearned for the hereafter. He was known as the poet of the "blue flower", a symbol of romantic yearning from Novalis's unfinished novel Heinrich von Ofterdingen that became a key emblem for German Romanticism. His fellow Jena Romantics, such as Friedrich Schlegel, Tieck, and Schleiermacher, also describe him as a poet who dreamt of a spiritual world beyond this one. Novalis's diagnosis of tuberculosis, which was known as the "white plague", contributed to his romantic reputation. Because Sophie von Kühn was also thought to have died from tuberculosis, Novalis became the poet of the blue flower who was reunited with his beloved through the death of the white plague.

The image of Novalis as a Romantic poet became enormously popular. When Novalis's biography by his long-time friend August Cölestin Just was published in 1815, Just was criticized for misrepresenting Novalis's poetic nature because he had written that Novalis was also a hard-working mine inspector and magistrate. Even the literary critic Thomas Carlyle, whose essay on Novalis played a major role in introducing him to the English-speaking world and took Novalis's philosophical relationship to Fichte and Kant seriously, emphasized Novalis as a mystic poet in the style of Dante. The author and theologian George MacDonald, who translated Novalis's Hymns to the Night in 1897 into English, also understood him as a mystic poet.

=== As philosophical thinker ===
In the twentieth century, Novalis's writings were more thoroughly and systematically collected than previously. The availability of these works provides further evidence that his interests went beyond poetry and novels and has led to a reassessment of Novalis's literary and intellectual goals. He was deeply read in science, law, philosophy, politics and political economy and left an abundance of notes on these topics. His early work displays his ease and familiarity with these diverse fields. His later works also include topics from his professional duties. In his notebooks, Novalis also reflected on the scientific, aesthetic, and philosophical significance of his interests. In his Notes for a Romantic Encyclopaedia, he worked out connections between the different fields he studied as he sought to integrate them into a unified worldview.

Novalis's philosophical writings are often grounded in nature. His works explore how personal freedom and creativity emerge in the affective understanding of the world and others. He suggests that this can only be accomplished if people are not estranged from the earth. In Pollen, Novalis writes "We are on a mission: Our calling is the cultivation of the earth", arguing that human beings come to know themselves through experiencing and enlivening nature. Novalis's personal commitment to understanding one's self and the world through nature can be seen in Novalis's unfinished novel, Heinrich von Ofterdingen, in which he uses his knowledge of natural science derived from his work overseeing salt mining to understand the human condition. Novalis's commitment to cultivating nature has even been considered as a potential source of insight for a deeper understanding of the environmental crisis.

== Magical idealism ==
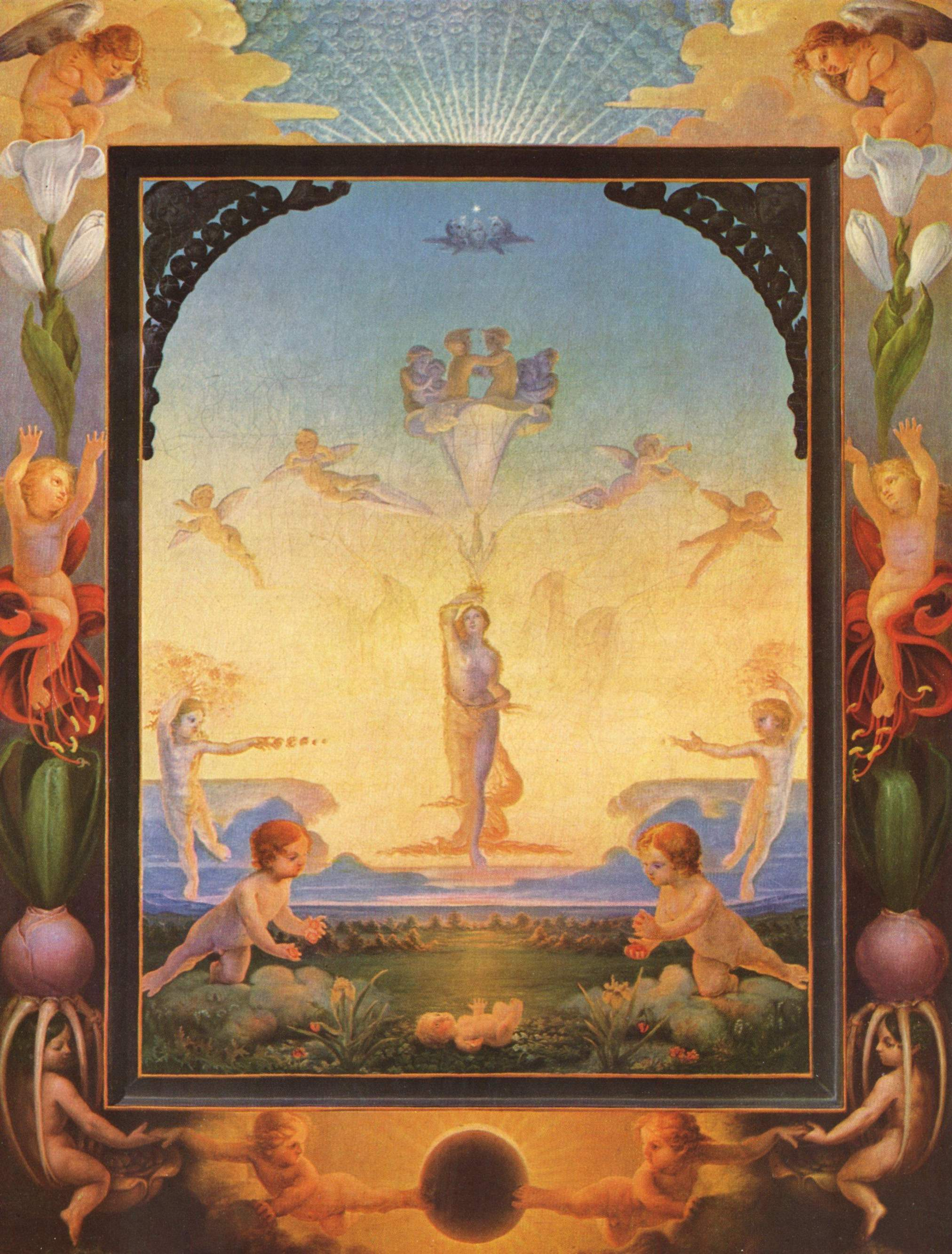
Philipp Otto Runge's Der kleine Morgen (Little Morning) (1808) was also inspired by Novalis's ideas.

Novalis's personal worldview—informed by his education, philosophy, professional knowledge, and pietistic background—has become known as magical idealism, a name derived from Novalis's reference in his 1798 notebooks to a type of literary prophet, the magischer Idealist (magical idealist). In this worldview, philosophy and poetry are united. Magical idealism is Novalis's synthesis of the German idealism of Fichte and Schelling with the creative imagination. The goal of the creative imagination is to break down the barriers between language and world, as well as the subject and object. The magic is the enlivening of nature as it responds to our will.

Another element of Novalis's magical idealism is his concept of love. In Novalis's view, love is a sense of relationship and sympathy between all beings in the world, which is considered both the basis of magic and its goal. From one perspective, Novalis's emphasis on the term magic represents a challenge to what he perceived as the disenchantment that came with modern rationalistic thinking. In modern interpretation from the rationalistic perspective, however, Novalis's use of magic and love in his writing is a performative act of his philosophical and literary goals. These words are meant to startle readers into attentiveness, making them aware of his use of the arts, particularly poetry with its metaphor and symbolism, to explore and unify various understandings of nature in his all-embracing investigations.

Magical idealism also addresses the idea of health. Novalis derived his theory of health from the Scottish physician John Brown's system of medicine, which sees illness as a mismatch between sensory stimulation and internal state. Novalis extends this idea by suggesting that illness arises from a disharmony between the self and the world of nature. This understanding of health is immanent: the "magic" is not otherworldly, it is based on the body and mind's relationship to the environment. According to Novalis, health is maintained when we use our bodies as means to sensitively perceive the world rather than to control the world: the ideal is where the individual and the world interplay harmoniously. It has been argued that there is an anxiety in Novalis's sense of magical idealism that denies actual touch, which leads inevitably to death, and replaces it with an idea of "distant touch".

== Religious views ==
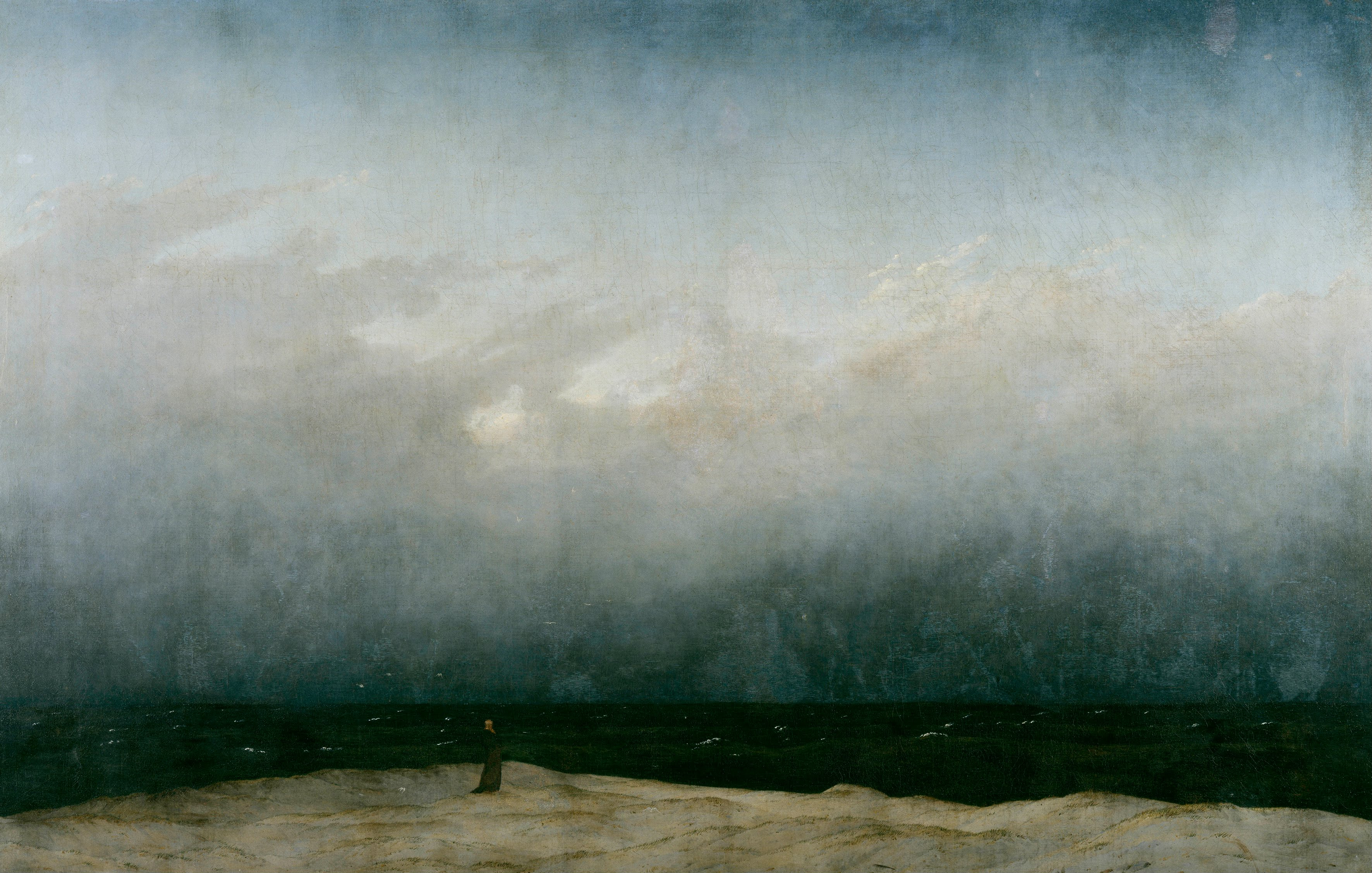
Caspar David Friedrich's Monk by the Sea (ca. 1808). Friedrich was also influenced by Novalis's and the Jena Romantics' aesthetic theories.

Novalis's religious perspective remains a subject of debate. Novalis's early rearing in a Pietist household affected him throughout his life. The impact of his religious background on his writings is particularly clear in his two major poetic works. Hymns to the Night contains many Christian symbols and themes. And, Novalis's Spiritual Songs, which were posthumously published in 1802 were incorporated into Lutheran hymnals; Novalis called the poems "Christian Songs", and they were intended to be published in the Athenaeum under the title Specimens From a New Devotional Hymn Book. One of his final works, which was posthumously named Die Christenheit oder Europa (Christianity or Europe) when it was first published in full in 1826, has generated a great deal of controversy regarding Novalis's religious views. This essay, which Novalis himself had simply entitled Europa, called for European unity in Novalis's time by poetically referencing a mythical Medieval golden age when Europe was unified under the Catholic Church.

One view of Novalis's work is that it maintains a traditional Christian outlook. Novalis's brother, Carl, writes that during his final illness, Novalis would read the works of the theologians Nicolaus Zinzendorf and Johann Kaspar Lavater, as well as the Bible. On the other hand, during the decades following Novalis's death, German intellectuals, such as the author Karl Hillebrand and the literary critic Hermann Theodor Hettner thought that Novalis was essentially a Catholic in his thinking. In the twentieth century, this view of Novalis has sometimes led to negative assessments of his work. Hymns to the Night has been described as an attempt by Novalis to use religion to avoid the challenges of modernity, and Christianity or Europe has been described variously as desperate prayer, a reactionary manifesto or a theocratic dream.

Another view of Novalis's work is that it reflects a Christian mysticism. After Novalis died, the Jena Romantics wrote of him as a seer who would bring forth a new gospel: one who lived his life as one aiming toward the spiritual while looking at death as a means of overcoming human limitation in a revolutionary movement toward God. In this more romantic view, Novalis was a visionary who saw contemporary Christianity as a stage to an even higher expression of religion where earthly love rises to a heavenly love as death itself is defeated by that love. At the end of the nineteenth century, the playwright and poet Maurice Maeterlinck also described Novalis as a mystic. However, Maeterlinck acknowledged the impact of Novalis's intellectual interests on his religious views, describing Novalis as a "scientific mystic" and comparing him to the physicist and philosopher Blaise Pascal.

More recently, Novalis's religious outlook has been analysed from the point of view of his philosophical and aesthetic commitments. In this view, Novalis's religious thought was based on his attempts to reconcile Fichte's idealism, in which the sense of self arises in the distinction of subject and object, with Baruch Spinoza's naturalistic philosophy, in which all being is one substance. Novalis sought a single principle through which the division between ego and nature becomes mere appearance. As Novalis's philosophical thinking on religion developed, it became influenced by the Platonism of Hemsterhuis, as well as the Neoplatonism of Plotinus. Accordingly, Novalis aimed to synthesize naturalism and theism into a "religion of the visible cosmos". Novalis believed that individuals could obtain mystic insight, but religion can remain rational: God could be a Neoplatonic object of intellectual intuition and rational perception, the logos that structures the universe. In Novalis's view, this vision of the logos is not merely intellectual, but moral too, as Novalis states "god is virtue itself". This vision includes Novalis's idea of love, in which self and nature united in a mutually supportive existence. This understanding of Novalis's religious project is illustrated by a quote from one of his notes in his Fichte-Studien (Fichte Studies): "Spinoza ascended as far as nature- Fichte to the 'I', or the person, I ascend to the thesis of God".

According to this Neoplatonic reading of Novalis, his religious language can be understood using the "magic wand of analogy", a phrase Novalis used in Europe and Christianity to clarify how he meant to use history in that essay. This use of analogy was partly inspired by Schiller, who argued that analogy allows facts to be connected into a harmonious whole, and by his relationship with Friedrich Schlegel, who sought to explore the revelations of religion through the union of philosophy and poetry. The "magic wand of analogy" allowed Novalis to use metaphor, analogy and symbolism to bring together the arts, science, and philosophy in his search for truth. This view of Novalis's writing suggests that his literary language must be read carefully. His metaphors and images—even in works like Hymns to the Night—are not only mystical utterances; they also express philosophical arguments. Read in this perspective, a work like Novalis's Christianity or Europe is not a call to return to a lost golden age. Rather, it is an argument in poetic language, phrased in the mode of a myth, for a cosmopolitan vision of a unity that brings together past and future, ideal and real, to engage the listener in an unfinished historical process.

== Writings ==
=== Poetry ===
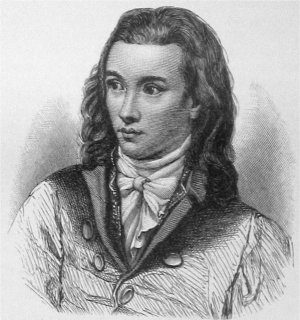
Posthumous Romantic portrait of Novalis from 1845 by Friedrich Eduard Eichens (based on Franz Gareis's 1799 painting)

Novalis is best known as a German Romantic poet. His two sets of poems, Hymns to the Night and Spiritual Songs, are considered his major lyrical achievements. Hymns to the Night were begun in 1797 after the death of Sophie von Kühn. About eight months after they were completed, a revised edition of the poems was published in the Athenaeum. The Spiritual Songs, which were written in 1799, were posthumously published in 1802. Novalis called the poems Christian Songs, and they were intended to be entitled Specimens From a New Devotional Hymn Book. After his death, many of the poems were incorporated into Lutheran hymn-books. Novalis also wrote a number of other occasional poems, which can be found in his collected works. Translations of poems into English include:

- Hymns to the Night
  - "Hymns to the Night". Hymns and Thoughts on Religion by Novalis. Translated by W. Hastie. Edinburgh, Scotland: T. & T. Clark. 1888.
  - "Hymns to the Night". Novalis: His Life, Thoughts and Works. Translated by Hope, M. J. Chicago: McClurg. 1891.
  - "Hymns to the Night". Rampolli. Translated by MacDonald, George. 2005 [1897] – via Project Gutenberg.
  - Hymns to the Night. Translated by Higgins, Dick. Kingston, NY: McPherson & Company. 1988. This modern translation includes the German text (with variants) en face.
- Spiritual Songs
  - "Spiritual Songs". Hymns and Thoughts on Religion by Novalis. Translated by Hastie, W. Edinburg, Scotland: T. & T. Clark. 1888.
  - "Spiritual Hymns". The Disciples at Saïs and Other Fragments. Translated by F. V. M. T; U. C. B. London: Methuen. 1903.
  - "Spiritual Songs". Rampolli. Translated by MacDonald, George. Chicago: T. & T. Clark. 2005 [1897] – via Project Gutenberg.
  - Hymns to the Night/Spiritual Songs. Translated by MacDonald, George. with foreword by Prokofieff, Sergei O. London: Temple Lodge Publishing. 2001. ISBN 9780904693416.

=== Unfinished novels ===
Novalis wrote two unfinished novel fragments, Heinrich von Ofterdingen and Die Lehrlinge zu Sais (The Novices at Sais), both of which were published posthumously by Tieck and Schlegel in 1802. The novels both aim to describe a universal world harmony with the help of poetry. The Novices at Sais contains the fairy tale "Hyacinth and Rose Petal". Heinrich von Ofterdingen is the work in which Novalis introduced the image of the blue flower. Heinrich von Ofterdingen was conceived as a response to Goethe's Wilhelm Meister's Apprenticeship, a work that Novalis had read with enthusiasm but judged as being highly unpoetic. He disliked Goethe making the economical victorious over the poetic in the narrative, so Novalis focused on making Heinrich von Ofterdingen triumphantly poetic. Both of Novalis's novels also reflect human experience through metaphors related to his studies in natural history from Freiberg. Translations of Novels into English include:

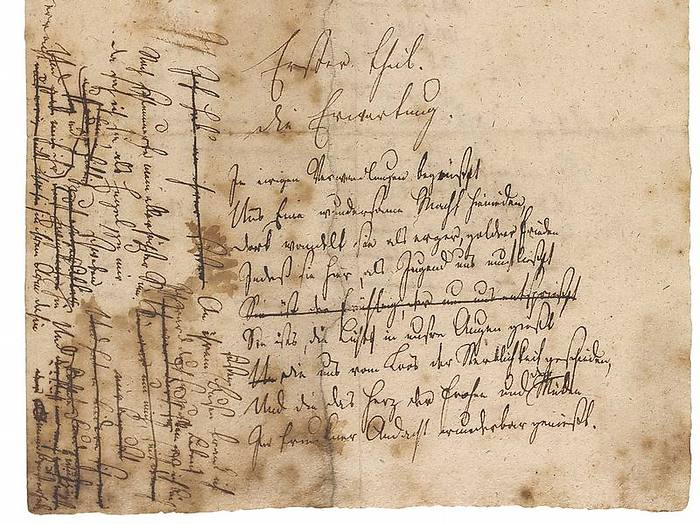
Novalis's handwriting (excerpt from Heinrich von Ofterdingen)

- Heinrich von Ofterdingen
  - Henry von Ofterdingen: A Romance. Cambridge, England: John Owens. 1842. (Translated by Frederick S. Stallknecht and Edward C. Sprague.)
  - "Heinrich von Ofterdingen". Novalis: His Life, Thoughts and Works. Translated by Hope, M. J. Chicago: McClurg. 1891.
  - Henry von Ofterdingen. Translated by Hilty, Palmer. Long Grove, IL: Waveland Press. 1990.
- The Novices at Sais
  - "The Disciples at Saïs". The Disciples at Saïs and Other Fragments. Translated by F. V. M. T; U. C. B. London: Methuen. 1903.
  - The Novices of Sais. Translated by Manheim, Ralph. Brooklyn, NY: Archipelago Books. 2005. This translation was originally published in 1949 and includes illustrations by Paul Klee.

=== Fragments ===
Together with Friedrich Schlegel, Novalis developed the fragment as a literary art form in German. For Schlegel, the fragment served as a literary vehicle that mediated apparent oppositions. Its model was the fragment from classical sculpture, whose part evoked the whole, or whose finitude evoked infinite possibility, via the imagination. The use of the fragment allowed Novalis to easily express himself on any issue of intellectual life he wanted to address, and it served as a means of expressing Schlegel's ideal of a universal "progressive universal poesy", that fused "poetry and prose into an art that expressed the totality of both art and nature". This genre particularly suited Novalis as it allowed him to express himself in a way that kept both philosophy and poetry in a continuous relationship. His first major use of the fragment as a literary form, Pollen, was published in the Athenaeum in 1798. English translations include:

- "Pollen"
  - "Pollen" . Writings of Novalis, Volume 2 – via Wikisource. This and subsequent wikisource references are translations from Minor, Jakob (1907). Novalis Schriften, Volume 2 [Writings of Novalis, Volume 2] (in German). Jena, Germany: Eugene Diederichs. pp. 110–139. This version of Pollen is the one published in the Athenaeum in 1798, which was edited by Schlegel. and includes four of Schlegel's fragments in fine print.
  - Gelley, Alexander (1991). "Miscellaneous Remarks (Original Version of Pollen)". New Literary History. 22 (2): 383–406. doi:10.2307/469045. JSTOR 469045. (registration required) This version is translated from Novalis's unpublished original manuscript.
  - "Pollen". Novalis: Philosophical Writings. Translated by Stoljar, Margaret Mahoney. Albany, NY: State University of New York Press. 1997. This version is also translated from Novalis's unpublished original manuscript.

=== Political writings ===
During his lifetime, Novalis wrote two works on political themes, Faith and Love or the King and the Queen and his speech Europa, which was posthumously named Christianity or Europe. In addition to their political focus, both works share a common theme of poetically arguing for the importance of "faith and love" to achieve human and communal unification. Because these works poetically address political concerns, their meaning continues to be the subject of disagreement. Their interpretations have ranged from being seen as reactionary manifestos celebrating hierarchies to utopian dreams of human solidarity.

Faith and Love or the King and the Queen was published in Yearbooks of the Prussian Monarchy in 1798, just after King Frederick William III and his popular wife Queen Louise ascended to the throne of Prussia. In this work, Novalis addresses the king and queen, emphasizing their importance as role models for creating an enduring state of interconnectedness both on the individual and collective level. Though a substantial portion of the essay was published, Frederick Wilhelm III censored the publication of additional installments as he felt it held the monarchy to impossibly high standards. The work is also notable in that Novalis extensively used the literary fragment to make his points.

Europa was written and originally delivered to a private group of friends in 1799. It was intended for the Athenaeum; after it was presented, Schlegel decided not to publish it. It was not published in full until 1826. It is a poetical, cultural-historical speech with a focus on a political utopia with regard to the Middle Ages. In this text, Novalis tries to develop a new Europe which is based on a new poetical Christendom which shall lead to unity and freedom. He got the inspiration for this text from a book written by Schleiermacher, Über die Religion (On Religion). The work was a response to the French Revolution and its implications for the French Enlightenment, which Novalis saw as catastrophic. It anticipated the growing German and Romantic critiques of the then-current Enlightenment ideologies in the search for a new European spirituality and unity. Below are some available English translations, as well as two excerpts that illustrate how Europa has variously been interpreted.

- Faith and Love or the King and the Queen
  - "Faith and Love or the King and the Queen" . Writings of Novalis, Volume 2 – via Wikisource. This version follows the published version in that it treats the first six fragments as part of a prelude, so it is numbered differently than later versions. Page links in the Wikisource document can be used to compare the English translation to the German original.
  - "Faith and Love or the King and the Queen". Novalis: Philosophical Writings. Translated by Stoljar, Margaret Mahoney. Albany, NY: State University of New York Press. 1997.
  - "Novalis, Faith and Love". The Early Political Writings of the German Romantics. Translated by Beiser, Frederick C. Cambridge, England: Cambridge University Press. 1996.
- Europa (posthumously named Christianity or Europe)
  - "Novalis, "Christendom or Europe" [Die Christenheit oder Europa] (1799)" (PDF). German History in Documents and Images (GHDI). Translated by Passage, Charles E. Archived from the original (PDF) on 4 November 2020.
  - "The Future of Christendom [excerpt from Europa]". Hymns and Thoughts on Religion by Novalis. Translated by Hastie, W. Edinburg, Scotland: T. & T. Clark. 1888.
  - Seth, Catriona; von Kulessa, Rotrand, eds. (2017). "Spiritual Advent [excerpt from Europa]". The Idea of Europe: Enlightenment Perspectives. Translated by Seth, Catriona. Cambridge, England: Open Book Press. JSTOR j.ctt1sq5v84.50.

=== Collected and miscellaneous works in English ===
Additional works that have been translated into English are listed below. Most of the works reflect Novalis's more philosophical and scientific sides, most of which were not systematically collected, published, and translated until the 20th century. Their publication has called for a reassessment of Novalis and his role as a thinker as well as an artist.

- Philosophical and political works
  - "Monologue". Earlham College. Translated by Güven, Fervit. Archived from the original on 29 January 2020. In Monologue, Novalis discuss the limits and nature of language.
  - Writings of Novalis, Volume 2 – via Wikisource. This translation of Jacob Minor's version of Novalis's collected works includes Pollen, Faith and Love or the King and Queen, and Monologue. It also includes Klarisse, Novalis's brief description of Sophie von Kühn.
  - Bernstein, Jay, ed. (2003). Classic and Romantic German Aesthetics. Translated by Crick, Joyce P. Cambridge, England: Cambridge University Press. This collection contains a selection of Novalis's fragments, as well as his work Dialogues. This volume also has collections of fragments by Friedrich Schlegel and Hölderlin.
  - Stoljar, Margaret Mahoney, ed. (1997). Novalis: Philosophical Writings. Translated by Stoljar, Margaret Mahoney. Albany, NY: State University of New York Press. This volume contains several of Novalis's works, including Pollen or Miscellaneous Observations, one of the few complete works published in his lifetime (though it was altered for publication by Friedrich Schlegel); Logological Fragments I and II; Monologue, a long fragment on language; Faith and Love or The King and Queen, a collection of political fragments also published during his lifetime; On Goethe; extracts from Das allgemeine Broullion or General Draft; and his essay Christendom or Europe.
  - Beiser, Frederick C., ed. (1996). The Early Political Writings of the German Romantics. Translated by Beiser, Frederick C. Cambridge, England: Cambridge University Press. This volume includes Pollen, Faith and Love or the King and Queen, Political Aphorisms, Christianity or Europe: A Fragment. It also has works by Friedrich Schlegel and Schleiermacher.
- Notebooks
  - Kellner, Jane, ed. (2003). Fichte Studies. Translated by Kellner, Jane. Cambridge, England: Cambridge University Press. This book is in the same series as the Classic and Romantic German Aesthetics. Contains Novalis's notes as he read and responded to Fichte's The Science of Knowledge.
  - Wood, David W., ed. (2007). Novalis: Notes for a Romantic Encyclopaedia (Das Allgemeine Brouillon). Translated by Wood, David W. Albany, NY: State University of New York Press.(The first 50 of the 1151 entries are available online.) This is an English translation of Novalis's unfinished project for a "universal science". It contains his thoughts on philosophy, the arts, religion, literature and poetry, and his theory of "Magical Idealism". The Appendix contains substantial extracts from Novalis's Freiberg Natural Scientific Studies 1798/1799.
- Journals
  - Donehower, Bruce., ed. (2007). The Birth of Novalis: Friedrich von Hardenberg's Journal of 1797, with Selected Letters and Documents. Translated by Donehower, Bruce. Albany, NY: State University of New York Press. This book includes Novalis's letters and journals around the time of Sophie's illness, as well as early biographies on Novalis.

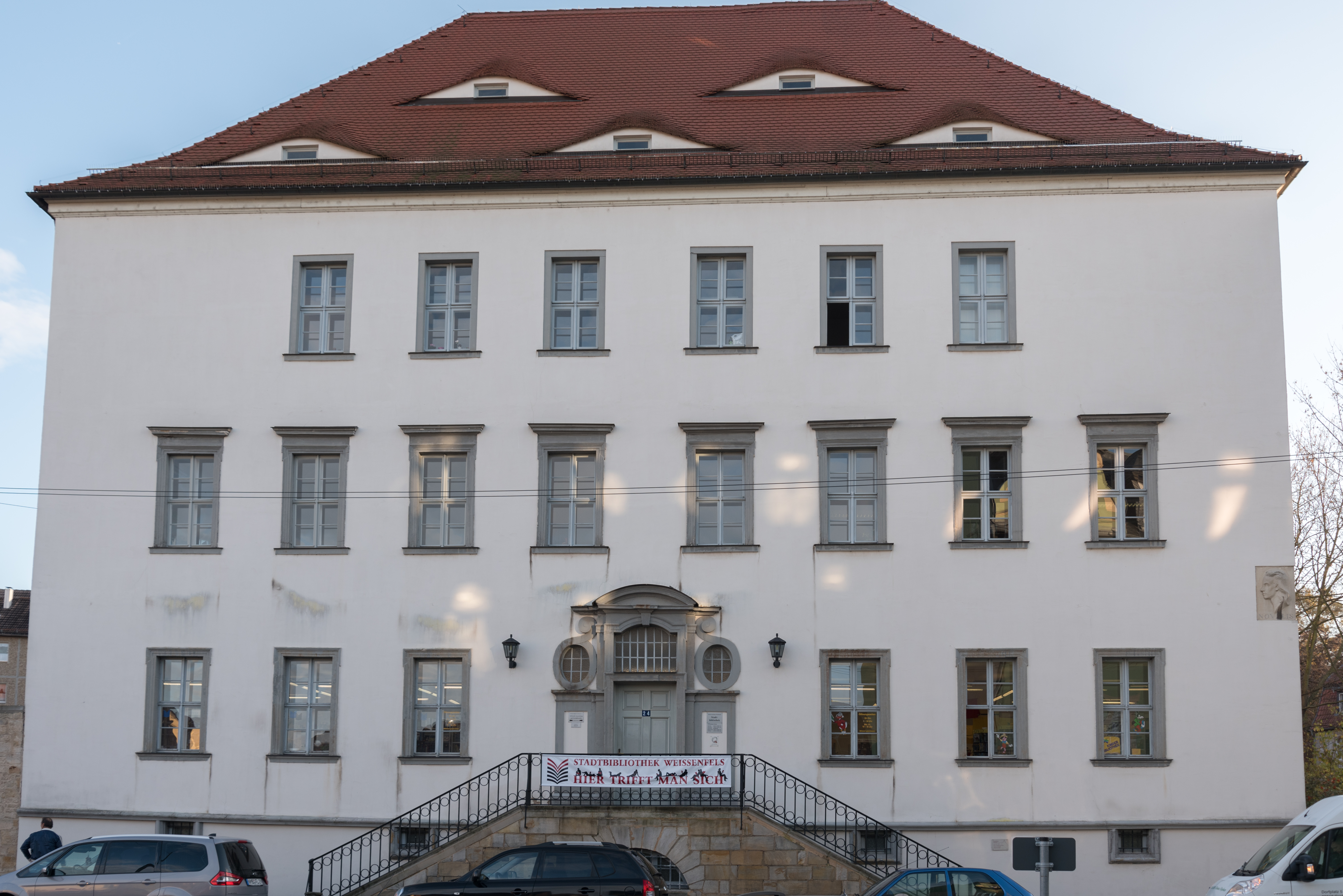
Novalis Museum at Weissenfels

=== Collected works (in German) ===
Novalis's works were originally issued in two volumes by his friends Ludwig Tieck and Friedrich Schlegel (2 vols. 1802; a third volume was added in 1846). Editions of Novalis's collected works have since been compiled by C. Meisner and Bruno Wille (1898), by Ernst Heilborn (3 vols., 1901), and by J. Minor (4 vols., 1907). Heinrich von Ofterdingen was published separately by J. Schmidt in 1876. The most current version of Novalis's collected works, a German-language, six-volume edition of Novalis's works Historische-Kritische Ausgabe - Novalis Schriften (HKA), is edited by Richard Samuel, Hans-Joachim Mähl & Gerhard Schulz. It is published by Kohlhammer Verlag, Stuttgart, 1960–2006.

- Novalis's Collected Works (Available online.)
  - Novalis Schriften (Novalis's Writings) (edited by Ludwig Tieck and Friedrich Schlegel; in German with Fraktur font), Berlin, Germany: G. Reimer, 1837 (fifth edition). This is the collection that originally established Novalis's reputation.
    - Volume I
    - Volume II
  - Novalis Schriften (edited by Jakob Minor; in German with Fraktur font) Jena, Germany: Eugen Diederichs, 1907. This is a more comprehensive and better-organized collection than Tieck and Schlegel's.
    - Volume I: Poetry
    - Volume II: Longer prose pieces, includes Europa and Faith and Love or the King and Queen
    - Volume III: Various fragments
    - Volume IV: Includes the unfinished novels

Novalis's Correspondence was edited by J. M. Raich in 1880. See R. Haym Die romantische Schule (Berlin, 1870); A. Schubart, Novalis' Leben, Dichten und Denken (1887); C. Busse, Novalis' Lyrik (1898); J. Bing, Friedrich von Hardenberg (Hamburg, 1899), E. Heilborn, Friedrich von Hardenberg (Berlin, 1901).

== Influence ==
The political philosopher Karl Marx's metaphorical argument that religion was the opium of the people was prefigured by Novalis's statement in Pollen where he describes "philistines" with the following analogy, "Their so-called religion works just like an opiate: stimulating, sedating, stilling pain through innervation".

Hungarian philosopher György Lukács derived his concept of philosophy as transcendental homelessness from Novalis. In his 1914–15 essay Theory of the Novel, he quotes Novalis at the top of the essay: "Philosophy is really homesickness—the desire to be everywhere at home." The essay unfolds closely related to this notion of Novalis—that modern philosophy "mourns the absence of a pre-subjective, pre-reflexive anchoring of reason" and is searching to be grounded but cannot achieve this aim due to philosophy's modern discursive nature. Later, however, Lukács repudiated Romanticism, writing that Novalis's "cult of the immediate and the unconscious necessarily leads to a cult of night and death, of sickness and decay."

The musical composer Richard Wagner's libretto for the opera Tristan und Isolde contains strong allusions to Novalis's symbolic language, especially the dichotomy between the Night and the Day that animates his Hymns to the Night.

The literary critic Walter Pater includes Novalis's quote, "Philosophiren ist dephlegmatisiren, vivificiren" ("to philosophize is to throw off apathy, to become revived") in his conclusion to Studies in the History of the Renaissance.

The esotericist and philosopher Rudolf Steiner spoke in various lectures (now published) about Novalis and his influence on anthroposophy.

The literary critic, philosopher and photographer's Franz Roh term magischer Realismus that he coined in his 1925 book Nach-Expressionismus, Magischer Realismus: Probleme der neuesten europäischen Malerei (Post-expressionism, Magic Realism: Problems in Recent European Painting) may have been inspired by Novalis's term magischer Realist.

André Breton and the Surrealists were greatly influenced by Novalis. Breton cited Novalis extensively in his study of art history, L'Art Magique, as well.

The 20th-century philosopher Martin Heidegger uses a Novalis fragment, "Philosophy is really homesickness, an urge to be at home everywhere," in the opening pages of The Fundamental Concepts of Metaphysics.

The UK Charity "Novalis Trust" which provides care and education for individuals with additional needs.

The author Hermann Hesse's writing was influenced by Novalis's poetry, and Hesse's last full-length novel Glasperlenspiel (The Glass Bead Game) contains a passage that appears to restate one of the fragments in Novalis's Pollen.

The artist and activist Joseph Beuys's aphorism "Everyone is an artist" was inspired by Novalis, who wrote "Every person should be an artist" in Faith and Love or the King and the Queen.

The author Jorge Luis Borges refers often to Novalis in his work.

Novalis has also influenced film theory by way of Jacques Rancière, who employs various elements of German Idealism and Romanticism in his philosophical work on critical philosophy and the regimes of art.

== Sources ==
- Chisholm, Hugh, ed. (1911). "Novalis" . Encyclopædia Britannica. Vol. 19 (11th ed.). Cambridge University Press. p. 829.
