= Hymns to the Night =

Set of poems by Novalis

Hymns to the Night (Hymnen an die Nacht) is a set of six prose poems written by the German Romantic poet Novalis (Georg Philipp Friedrich von Hardenberg) and published in 1800. The poems were written in response to the death of Novalis' fiance, Sophie von Kuehn, in 1797.

== Description ==
The poems are written in the first person and the main focus is Novalis' grief over the death of his fiance. The third poem contains phrases directly lifted from Novalis' 1797 diary entries.

Like some of his other works, the Hymns contain elements of Christian thought; Novalis inserts several metaphors to Christian divinity and the fifth poem directly concerns Christianity's central figure, Jesus Christ. German Romanticism was influenced by Christian mysticism.

Hymns to the Night concerns itself with the threshold between life and death, which Novalis describes using the metaphor of the night. The poem contains passages about light, night as a maternal figure, and sleep and dreams.

Life and death are—according to Novalis—developed into entwined concepts. So in the end, death is the romantic principle of life.

Influences from the literature of that time can be seen. The metaphors of the hymns are closely connected to the books Novalis had read at about the time of his writing of the hymns. These are prominently Shakespeare's Romeo and Juliet (in the translation by A. W. Schlegel, 1797) and Jean Paul's Unsichtbare Loge (1793).

The Hymns to the Night display a universal religion with an intermediary. This concept is based on the idea that there is always a third party between a human and God. This intermediary can either be Jesus—as in Christian lore—or the dead beloved as in the hymns. These works consist of three times two hymns. These three components are each structured in this way: the first hymn shows, with the help of the Romantic triad, the development from an assumed happy life on earth through a painful era of alienation to salvation in the eternal night; the following hymn tells of the awakening from this vision and the longing for a return to it. With each pair of hymns, a higher level of experience and knowledge is shown. Some of the poems notably lament the historical replacement of European Paganism by Christianity, creating ambiguity about the exact view of the Hymns on Christianity and polytheism.
