= Joachim Marscheider =

German sports shooter

Personal information
- Born: 2 March 1930 Stangerode, Germany

Sport
- Sport: Sports shooting
- Event: Trap shooting

Joachim Marscheider (born 2 March 1930) is a German former sports shooter. He competed in trap shooting at the 1964 Summer Olympics.

== Olympic Games ==
1964 Summer Olympics in Tokyo, competing for the United Team of Germany:

- Shooting – Men's trap – 8th place
