= Grossenrode =

Grossenrode Großenrode
- District
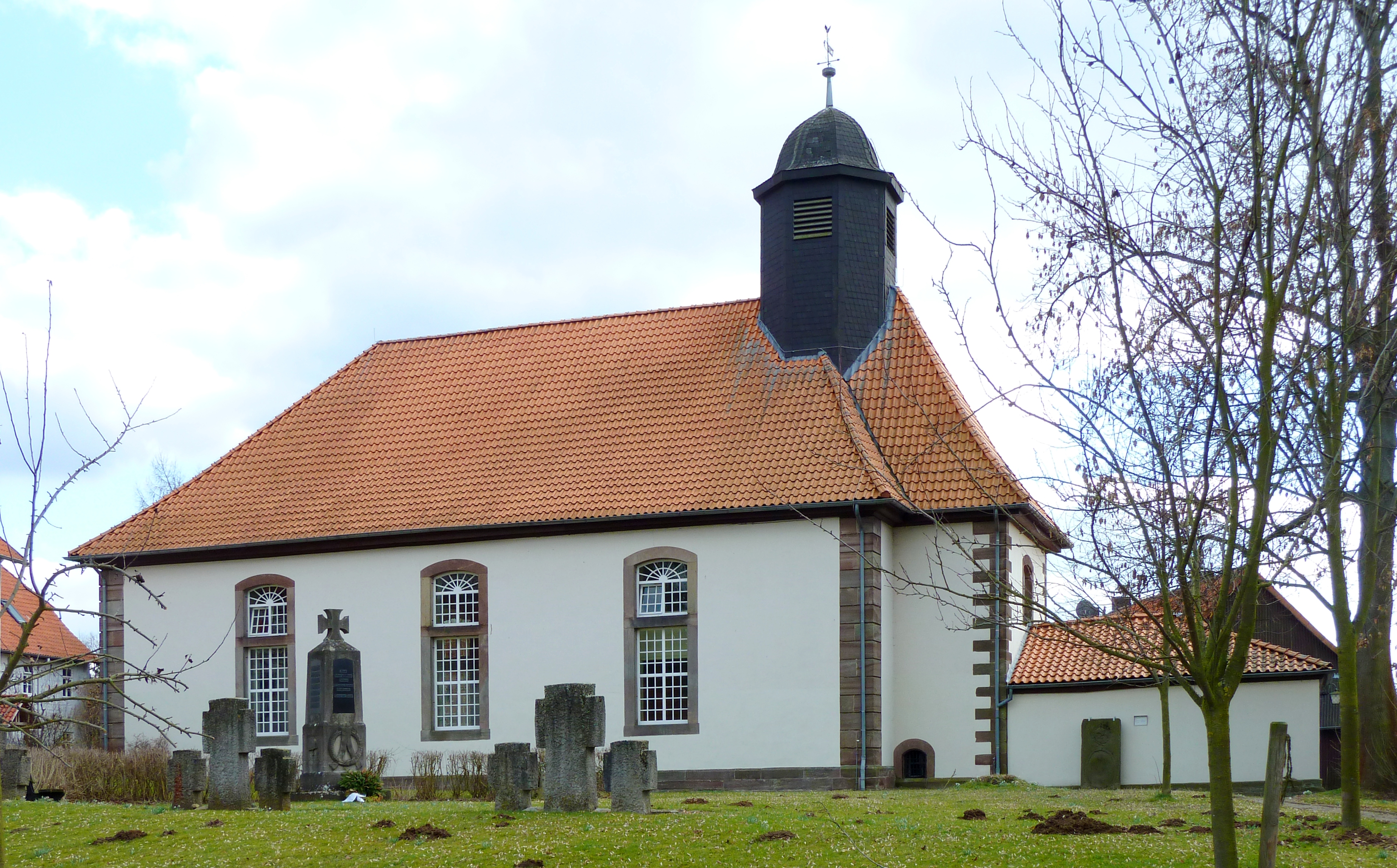
- Church of St. John (St. Johannis), Grossenrode. Built in 1730, inaugurated in 1740
- Interactive map of Grossenrode
- Coordinates: 51°40′11″N 9°54′30″E
- Country: Germany
- Region: Lower Saxony
- City: Moringen
- Website: Moringen

Grossenrode (in German: Großenrode) is a district of the town of Moringen in Northeim, Lower Saxony, Germany. It has about 330 inhabitants. Nearby places include Behrensen, Elvese, Hillerse, Schnedinghausen, Thüdinghausen, and Wolbrechtshausen.

== History ==
In the place where now stands Grossenrode was an ancient settlement, as evidenced by 1992 archaeological excavations, which uncovered a village with long houses and a cemetery from the Roessen period of around 4800 BC.

In 978 AD, Grossenrode was first named Nywenrode and the land was owned by the Fulda monastery as part of the village of Thüdinghausen. The teacher Ludwig Wöbbeking wrote in 1924 in his Dorfchronik about Grossenrode that it "is a Hardenbergic creation, of around 1230. At that time, the area, which is now the Grosserroder Feldmark, was still a large forest. Gunther, a younger son of Hardenberg, who had no desire to enter the spiritual offices like other younger sons of noblemen, went with a number of his father's attendants; they cleared the forest as far as was necessary, and called the freed surface Rode or, as was customary, with a Latin name, Novalis."

In 1389, the Hardenbergs sold the property.

From the early years of the 19th century, the Hardenberg's burial grounds were located in the Grossenrode church. The 1850 cholera epidemic spared the Nörten-Hardenberg region.

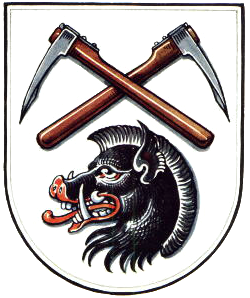
Coat of Arms of Grossenrode

On 1 March 1974, Grossenrode was integrated into the city of Moringen.

== Notable persons ==
A prominent member of the Hardenberg family was Georg Philipp Friedrich Freiherr von Hardenberg, better known as Novalis.
