= Christian August Friedrich Garcke =

German botanist (1819–1904)

Christian August Friedrich Garcke (25 October 1819 – 10 January 1904) was a German botanist who was a native of Bräunrode, Saxony-Anhalt.

He studied theology in Halle, obtaining his doctorate at the University of Jena in 1844. Afterwards he was a private scholar of botanical studies in Halle, relocating to Berlin in 1851, where he worked with botanist Alexander Braun (1805–1877). In 1865 he was appointed curator at the "Königlichen Herbarium" (later "Königlich botanisches Museum") in Berlin, and in 1871 became an associate professor specializing in pharmacognosy.

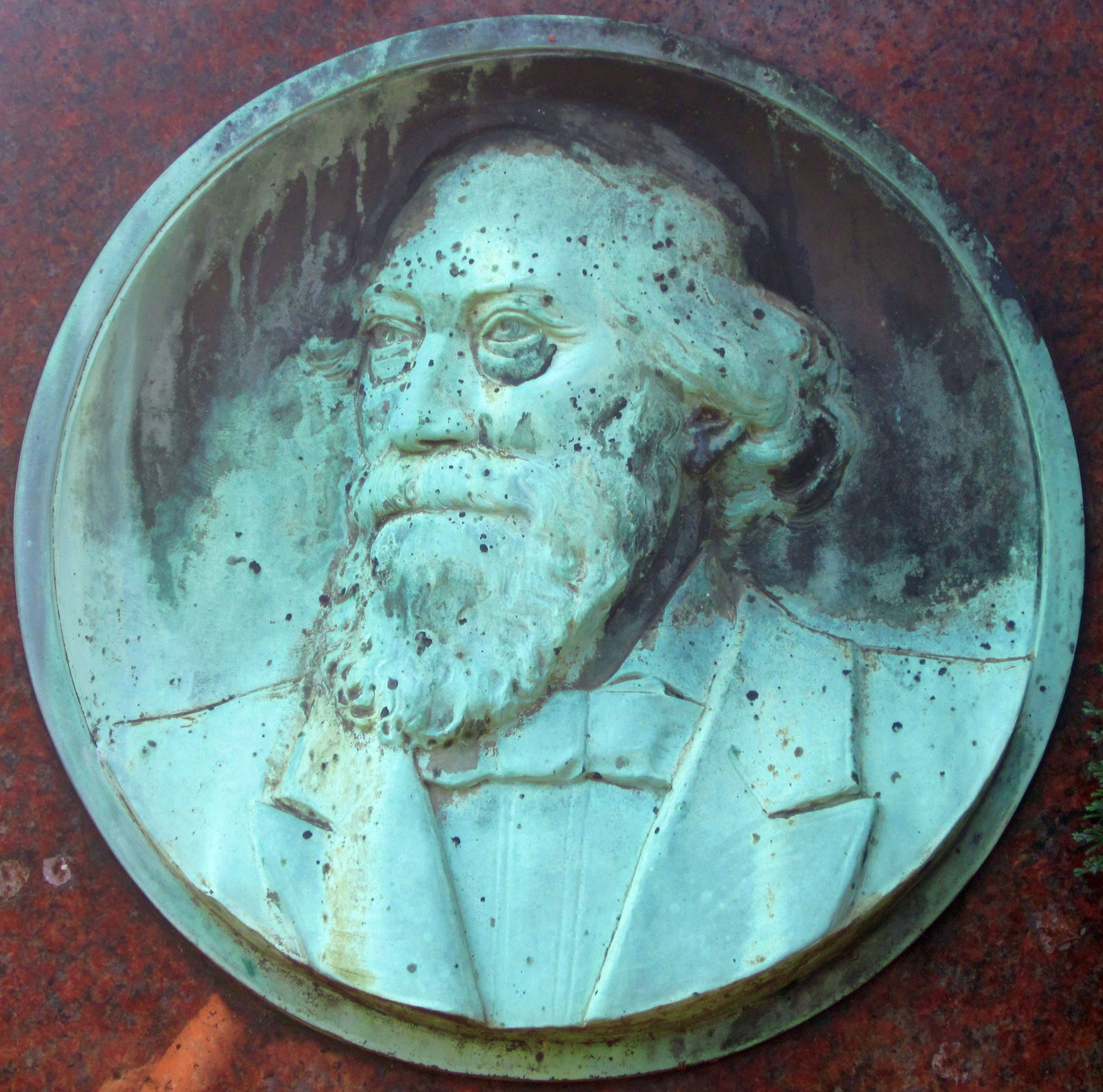
Plaque of Garcke at Friedhof III der Jerusalems- und Neuen Kirche on Mehringdamm 21 in Berlin-Kreuzberg.

He was author of the popular Flora von Nord- und Mitteldeutschland (Flora of North and Central Germany), a book that was published over numerous editions (first edition, 1849). Another significant work was the two-volume Flora von Halle (1848, 1856). From 1867 to 1882 he was editor of the journal Linnæa.

A number of botanical species bear his name; as an example, Thespesia garckeana.
