= Christianity or Europe (Novalis) =

1799 speech and pamphlet by Novalis

"Christianity or Europe" (German: "Die Christenheit oder Europa", also known simply as "Europa") is a pamphlet written by the German writer Novalis between October and November 1799. Novalis wrote the pamphlet to present to his Romantic contemporaries in Jena. The pamphlet presents a philosophy of history and religion, and culminates in a vision of a new epoch.

The pamphlet discusses the future of the European continent, which seemed unstable given the recent rise of Napoleon and the death of Pope Pius VI in 1799. He attempts to identify the roots of a perceived "withering of the sacral sense" in Europe, and investigates possibilities for its renewal. Novalis reminisces on the perceived glory of pre-Reformation Europe and advocates a greater political union between European states based on religion to bring Europe back to its former glory.

== Summary ==
In 1799, Europe was in a precarious situation. War between Germany and France seemed likely, and the Catholic Church was without a leader. Novalis believed that these conditions created an opportunity for a new, better era to begin. He saw the potential for Europe's regeneration through a renewal of the Catholic Church, which he hoped would allow Europe to be transformed into a universal spiritual community held together by a faith that transcended war and nationalism.

The central idea of the pamphlet is that in a place where religion has experienced a decline, ideologies fill the space once occupied by God. Novalis sensed a decline in the Catholic Church in Europe, and political ideologies, nationalism, and blind faith in science rushed in to fill the spiritual void. For Novalis, this replacement of God for ideology signified a loss, and was potentially even dangerous. A childlike sense of wonder present in the Middle Ages became replaced by a restless and mechanical modern world, causing Europe to become spiritually impoverished and disenchanted.

Novalis describes the beauty of the "primeval age" (German: Urzeit) which was followed by an intermediate phase of decay, which he and his contemporaries inhabited. This intermediate phase will, in Novalis' eyes, be followed by a restoration of the primeval age, but on a higher level. Novalis saw Europe at a possible transition from the intermediate to golden age at the time of his writing. The transformed Christianity that Novalis thought could herald this new epoch would replace beliefs in divine revelation with an inspired poetic spirit, and the new religion would have a strong emphasis on aesthetics.

At the end of the pamphlet, the author invites the reader to try and use this momentary threshold point in history to help reach the utopian final stage.

== Legacy ==
"Christianity or Europe" was controversial within Novalis' Jena circle. Some, such as Friedrich Schlegel, thought that the text should be published, but Goethe disagreed when he was asked for advice.

After Novalis' early death in 1801, the text remained unpublished in its entirety until 1826, when it was published by Georg Reimer.

== Sources ==
- Kleingeld, Pauline (2008). "Romantic Cosmopolitanism: Novalis's "Christianity or Europe"". Journal of the History of Philosophy. 46 (2): 269–284.
- Stockinger, Ludwig (2015). "Provokantes Christentum. Friedrich von Hardenbergs Beitrag zum Jenaer Romantikertreffen im November 1799". Das Jenaer Romantikertreffen im November 1799: Ein romantischer Streitfall. Paderborn: Ferdinand Schöningh. pp. 41–65. ISBN 978-3-506-78108-6.
