= Sandersleben =

- Stadtteil of Arnstein
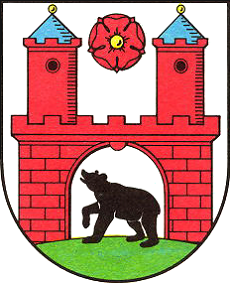
- Coat of arms
- Interactive map of Sandersleben
- Location within Germany Location within Saxony-Anhalt
- Coordinates: 51°40′N 11°34′E
- Country: Germany
- State: Saxony-Anhalt
- District: Mansfeld-Südharz
- Town: Arnstein

Area
  - Total: 18.22 km^{2} (7.03 sq mi)
- Elevation: 130 m (430 ft)

Population (2006-12-31)
  - Total: 1,988
  - Density: 109.1/km^{2} (282.6/sq mi)
- Time zone: UTC+01:00 (CET)
  - Summer (DST): UTC+02:00 (CEST)
- Postal codes: 06456
- Dialling codes: 034785
- Vehicle registration: MSH

Sandersleben (German pronunciation: [ˈzandɐsˌleːbn̩]; official name: Sandersleben (Anhalt)) is a town and a former municipality in the Mansfeld-Südharz district, in Saxony-Anhalt, Germany. It is situated on the river Wipper, approx. 17 km north of Eisleben. Since 1 January 2010, it has been administered as part of Arnstein.

Sandersleben (Anh) station lies on the Halle–Vienenburg and the Berlin-Blankenheim railways.

Notable residents of Sandersleben include:

- Bernhard von Krosigk (1582–1620)
- Gotthold Salomon (1784–1862)
- Georg Heinrich von Berenhorst (1733–1814)
