= Greifenhagen =

- Stadtteil of Arnstein
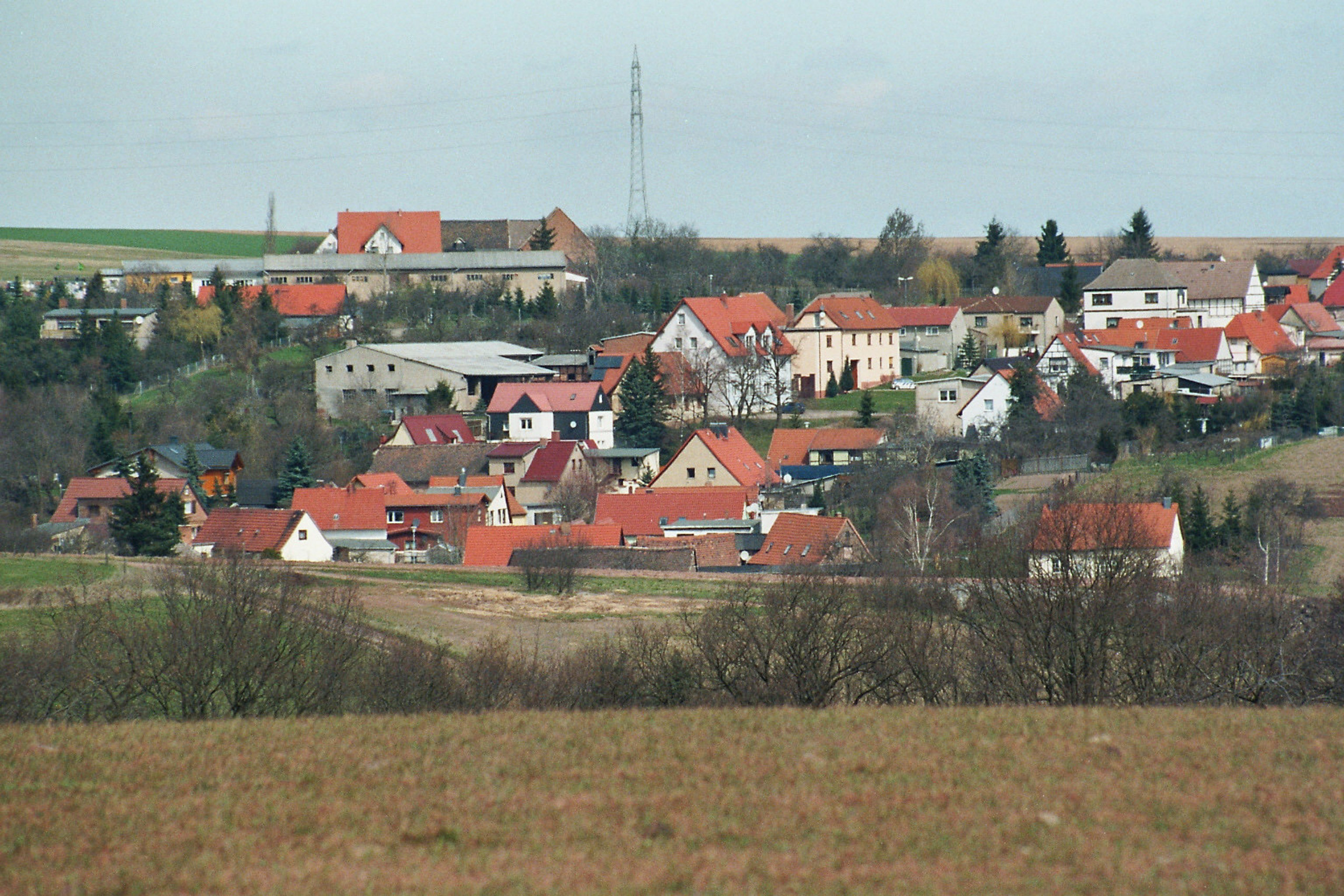
- Interactive map of Greifenhagen
- Location within Germany Location within Saxony-Anhalt
- Coordinates: 51°37′45″N 11°25′17″E
- Country: Germany
- State: Saxony-Anhalt
- District: Mansfeld-Südharz
- Town: Arnstein

Area
  - Total: 4.68 km^{2} (1.81 sq mi)
- Elevation: 279 m (915 ft)

Population (2006-12-31)
  - Total: 271
  - Density: 57.9/km^{2} (150/sq mi)
- Time zone: UTC+01:00 (CET)
  - Summer (DST): UTC+02:00 (CEST)
- Postal codes: 06333
- Dialling codes: 034781
- Vehicle registration: MSH

Greifenhagen is a village and a former municipality in the Mansfeld-Südharz district, Saxony-Anhalt, in east-central Germany. Since 1 January 2010, it has been part of the town of Arnstein.
