= Stangerode =

- Stadtteil of Arnstein
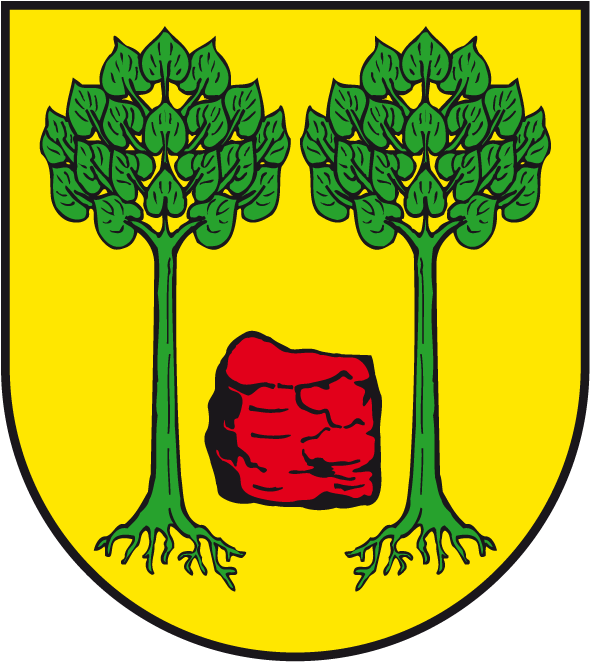
- Coat of arms
- Interactive map of Stangerode
- Location within Germany Location within Saxony-Anhalt
- Coordinates: 51°39′N 11°21′E
- Country: Germany
- State: Saxony-Anhalt
- District: Mansfeld-Südharz
- Town: Arnstein

Area
  - Total: 9.65 km^{2} (3.73 sq mi)
- Elevation: 276 m (906 ft)

Population (2006-12-31)
  - Total: 365
  - Density: 37.8/km^{2} (98.0/sq mi)
- Time zone: UTC+01:00 (CET)
  - Summer (DST): UTC+02:00 (CEST)
- Postal codes: 06543
- Dialling codes: 034742

Stangerode is a village and a former municipality in the Mansfeld-Südharz district, Saxony-Anhalt, Germany. Since 1 January 2010, it has been part of the town Arnstein. Olympian Joachim Marscheider was born here.
