= Quenstedt =

- Stadtteil of Arnstein
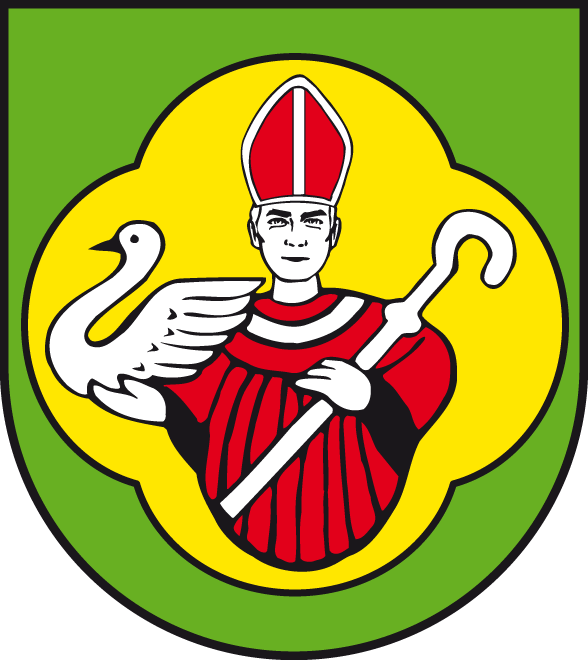
- Coat of arms
- Interactive map of Quenstedt
- Location within Germany Location within Saxony-Anhalt
- Coordinates: 51°42′N 11°28′E
- Country: Germany
- State: Saxony-Anhalt
- District: Mansfeld-Südharz
- Town: Arnstein

Area
  - Total: 15.20 km^{2} (5.87 sq mi)
- Elevation: 190 m (620 ft)

Population (2006-12-31)
  - Total: 846
  - Density: 55.7/km^{2} (144/sq mi)
- Time zone: UTC+01:00 (CET)
  - Summer (DST): UTC+02:00 (CEST)
- Postal codes: 06333
- Dialling codes: 03473
- Vehicle registration: MSH

Quenstedt is a village and a former municipality in the Mansfeld-Südharz district, Saxony-Anhalt, Germany.

Since 1 January 2010, it is part of the town Arnstein.
