= Sylda =

- Stadtteil of Arnstein
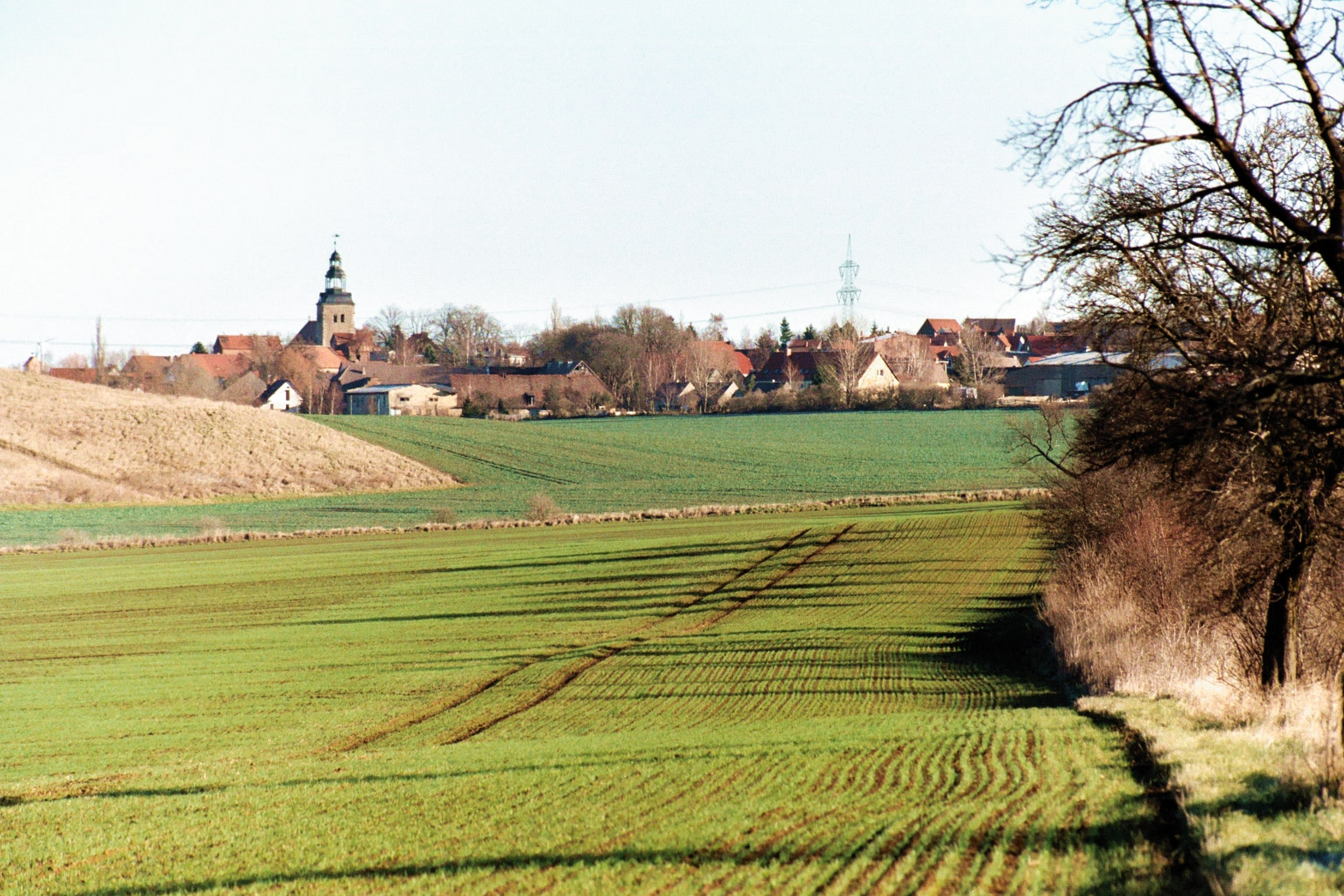

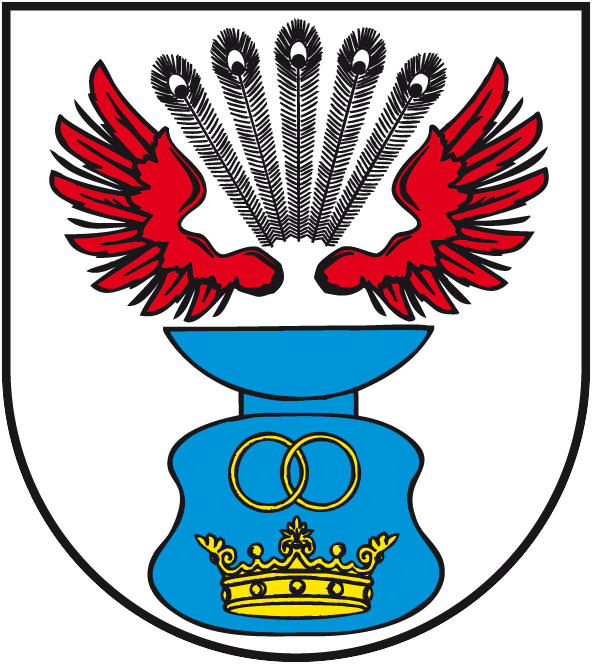
- Coat of arms
- Interactive map of Sylda
- Location within Germany Location within Saxony-Anhalt
- Coordinates: 51°40′45″N 11°25′32″E
- Country: Germany
- State: Saxony-Anhalt
- District: Mansfeld-Südharz
- Town: Arnstein

Area
  - Total: 9.33 km^{2} (3.60 sq mi)
- Elevation: 230 m (750 ft)

Population (2008-12-31)
  - Total: 512
  - Density: 54.9/km^{2} (142/sq mi)
- Time zone: UTC+01:00 (CET)
  - Summer (DST): UTC+02:00 (CEST)
- Postal codes: 06456
- Dialling codes: 034742
- Vehicle registration: MSH

Sylda is a village and a former municipality in the Mansfeld-Südharz district, Saxony-Anhalt, Germany. Since 1 January 2010, it is part of the town Arnstein.
