= Harkerode =

- Stadtteil of Arnstein
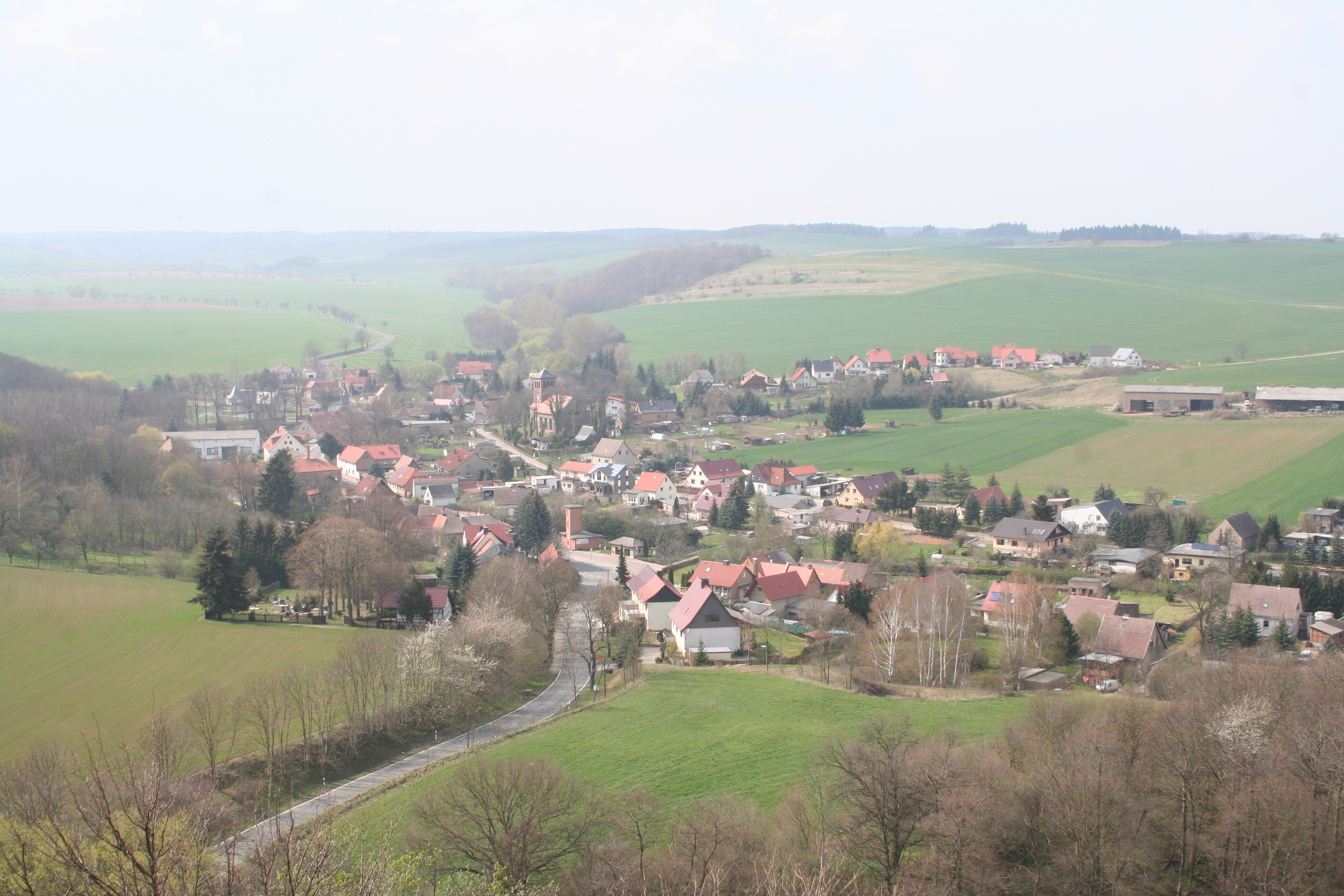

- Coat of arms
- Interactive map of Harkerode
- Location within Germany Location within Saxony-Anhalt
- Coordinates: 51°41′N 11°24′E
- Country: Germany
- State: Saxony-Anhalt
- District: Mansfeld-Südharz
- Town: Arnstein

Area
  - Total: 6.43 km^{2} (2.48 sq mi)
- Elevation: 214 m (702 ft)

Population (2006-12-31)
  - Total: 337
  - Density: 52.4/km^{2} (136/sq mi)
- Time zone: UTC+01:00 (CET)
  - Summer (DST): UTC+02:00 (CEST)
- Postal codes: 06543
- Dialling codes: 034742

Harkerode is a village and a former municipality in the Mansfeld-Südharz district, Saxony-Anhalt, Germany.

Since 1 January 2010, it is part of the town Arnstein.
