= Arnstedt =

- Stadtteil of Arnstein
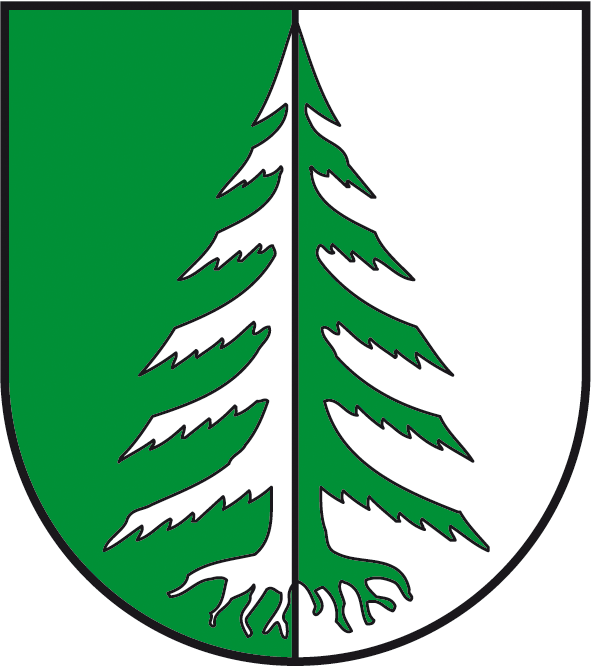
- Coat of arms
- Interactive map of Arnstedt
- Location within Germany Location within Saxony-Anhalt
- Coordinates: 51°41′N 11°30′E
- Country: Germany
- State: Saxony-Anhalt
- District: Mansfeld-Südharz
- Town: Arnstein

Area
  - Total: 8.76 km^{2} (3.38 sq mi)
- Elevation: 190 m (620 ft)

Population (2009-12-31)
  - Total: 552
  - Density: 63.0/km^{2} (163/sq mi)
- Time zone: UTC+01:00 (CET)
  - Summer (DST): UTC+02:00 (CEST)
- Postal codes: 06333
- Dialling codes: 034785
- Vehicle registration: MSH

Arnstedt is a village and a former municipality in the Mansfeld-Südharz district, Saxony-Anhalt, Germany.

Since 1 September 2010, it is part of the town Arnstein.
