= Wiederstedt =

- Stadtteil of Arnstein
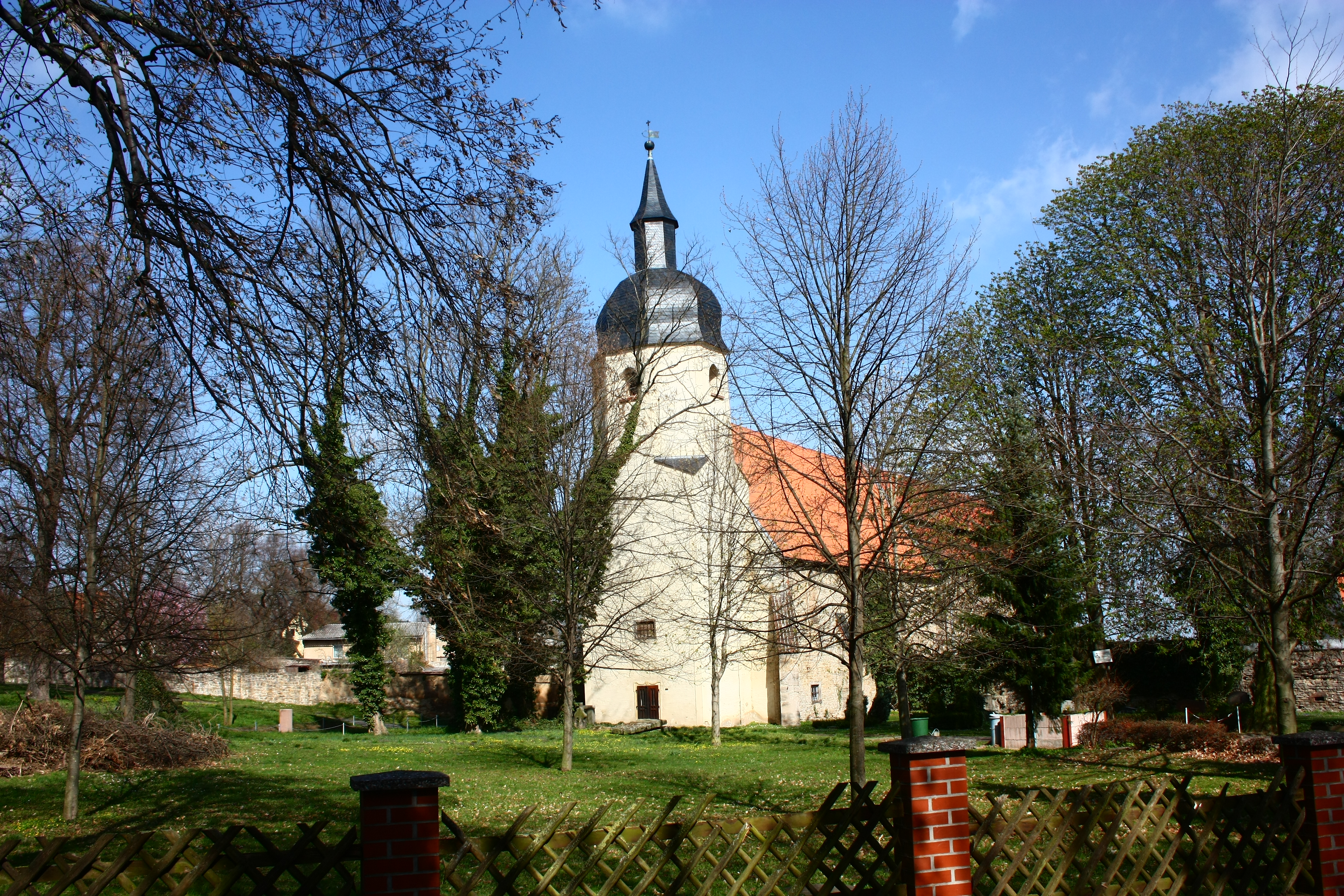
- The village church of Wiederstedt
- Interactive map of Wiederstedt
- Location within Germany Location within Saxony-Anhalt
- Coordinates: 51°40′N 11°32′E
- Country: Germany
- State: Saxony-Anhalt
- District: Mansfeld-Südharz
- Town: Arnstein

Area
  - Total: 9.54 km^{2} (3.68 sq mi)
- Elevation: 183 m (600 ft)

Population (2009-12-31)
  - Total: 1,074
  - Density: 113/km^{2} (292/sq mi)
- Time zone: UTC+01:00 (CET)
  - Summer (DST): UTC+02:00 (CEST)
- Postal codes: 06333
- Dialling codes: 03476
- Vehicle registration: MSH
- Website: www.wiederstedt.de

Wiederstedt is a village and a former municipality in the Mansfeld-Südharz district, Saxony-Anhalt, Germany.

Since 1 September 2010, it is part of the town Arnstein.

The village contains Schloss Oberwiederstedt the family home of the noted German romanticist Georg Philipp Friedrich Freiherr von Hardenberg.
