= Bräunrode =

- Stadtteil of Arnstein
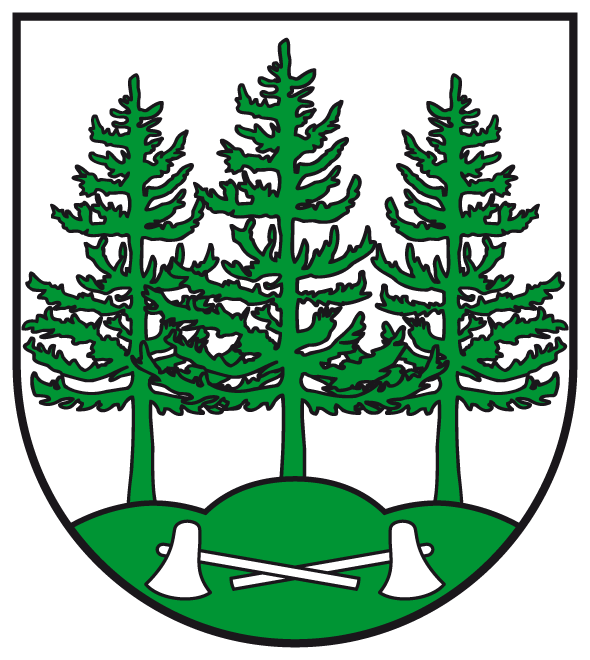
- Coat of arms
- Interactive map of Bräunrode
- Location within Germany Location within Saxony-Anhalt
- Coordinates: 51°38′N 11°24′E
- Country: Germany
- State: Saxony-Anhalt
- District: Mansfeld-Südharz
- Town: Arnstein

Area
  - Total: 17.75 km^{2} (6.85 sq mi)
- Elevation: 308 m (1,010 ft)

Population (2006-12-31)
  - Total: 477
  - Density: 26.9/km^{2} (69.6/sq mi)
- Time zone: UTC+01:00 (CET)
  - Summer (DST): UTC+02:00 (CEST)
- Postal codes: 06333
- Dialling codes: 034781

Bräunrode is a village and a former municipality in the Mansfeld-Südharz district, Saxony-Anhalt, Germany.

Since 1 January 2010, it is part of the town Arnstein.
