= Welbsleben =

- Stadtteil of Arnstein
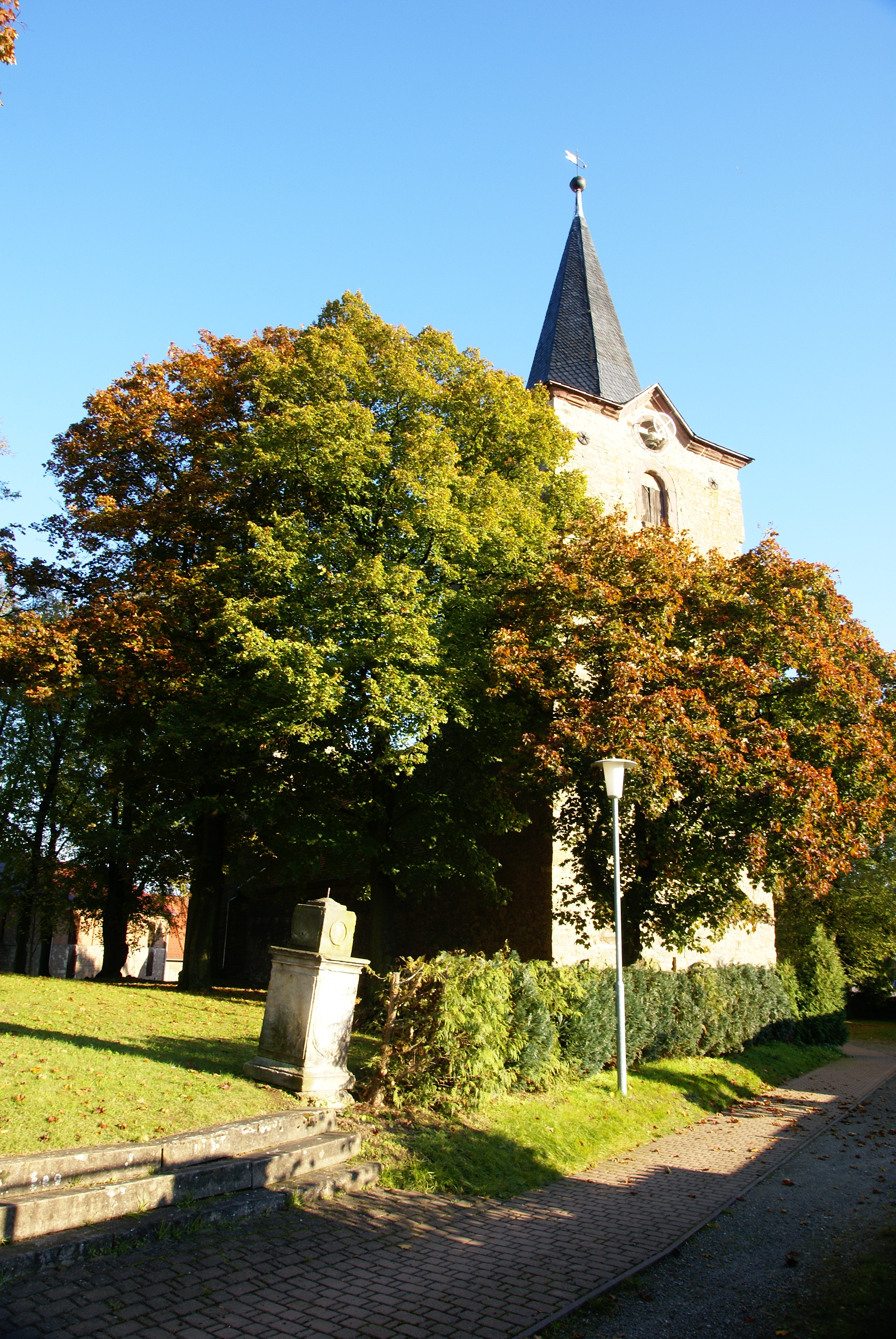

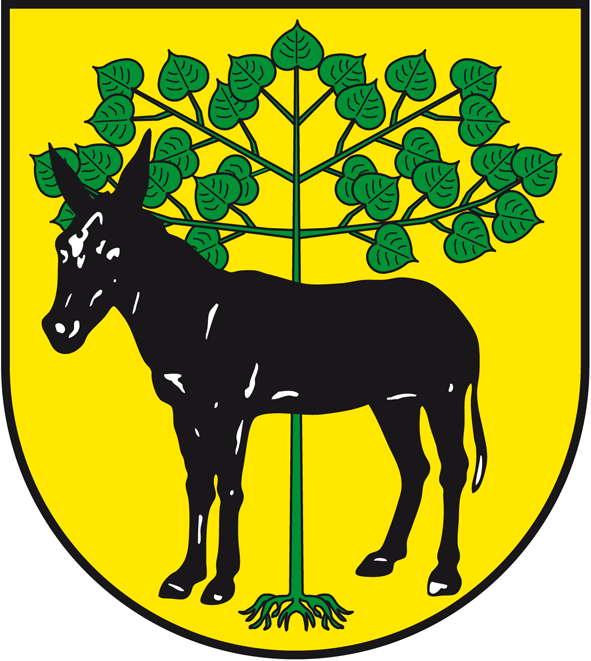
- Coat of arms
- Interactive map of Welbsleben
- Location within Germany Location within Saxony-Anhalt
- Coordinates: 51°42′N 11°25′E
- Country: Germany
- State: Saxony-Anhalt
- District: Mansfeld-Südharz
- Town: Arnstein

Area
  - Total: 9.06 km^{2} (3.50 sq mi)
- Elevation: 200 m (660 ft)

Population (2006-12-31)
  - Total: 743
  - Density: 82.0/km^{2} (212/sq mi)
- Time zone: UTC+01:00 (CET)
  - Summer (DST): UTC+02:00 (CEST)
- Postal codes: 06333
- Dialling codes: 03473

Welbsleben is a village and former municipality in the town of Arnstein, in the Mansfeld-Südharz district of Saxony-Anhalt, Germany.

Since 1 January 2010, it is part of the town Arnstein.
