= Hettstedt (Verwaltungsgemeinschaft) =

Coordinates: 51.633°N 11.500°E

Hettstedt was a Verwaltungsgemeinschaft ("collective municipality") in the Mansfeld-Südharz district, in Saxony-Anhalt, Germany. The seat of the Verwaltungsgemeinschaft was in Hettstedt. It was disbanded in September 2010.

The Verwaltungsgemeinschaft Hettstedt consisted of the following municipalities:

1. Hettstedt
2. Ritterode
3. Walbeck
