= Goldene Aue, Saxony-Anhalt =

Goldene Aue
- Verbandsgemeinde
- Map of Mansfeld-Südharz highlighting Goldene Aue
- Interactive map of Goldene Aue
- Location within Germany Location within Saxony-Anhalt
- Coordinates: 51°26′N 11°02′E
- Country: Germany
- State: Saxony-Anhalt
- District: Mansfeld-Südharz
- Seat: Kelbra
- Subdivisions: 5 municipalities

Area
  - Total: 127.31 km^{2} (49.15 sq mi)

Population (2025-12-31)
  - Total: 9,005
  - Density: 70.73/km^{2} (183.2/sq mi)
- Time zone: UTC+01:00 (CET)
  - Summer (DST): UTC+02:00 (CEST)
- Website: www.vwg-goldene-aue.de

Goldene Aue (German pronunciation: [ˈɡɔldənə ˈʔaʊə]) is a Verbandsgemeinde ("collective municipality") in the Mansfeld-Südharz district, in Saxony-Anhalt, Germany. Before 1 January 2010, it was a Verwaltungsgemeinschaft. It is situated south and west of Sangerhausen. It is named after the Goldene Aue valley. The seat of the Verbandsgemeinde is in Kelbra.

The Verbandsgemeinde Goldene Aue consists of the following municipalities:

1. Berga
2. Brücken-Hackpfüffel
3. Edersleben
4. Kelbra
5. Wallhausen
