= Berga-Kelbra station =

Railway station in Berga, Germany

Berga Kelbra
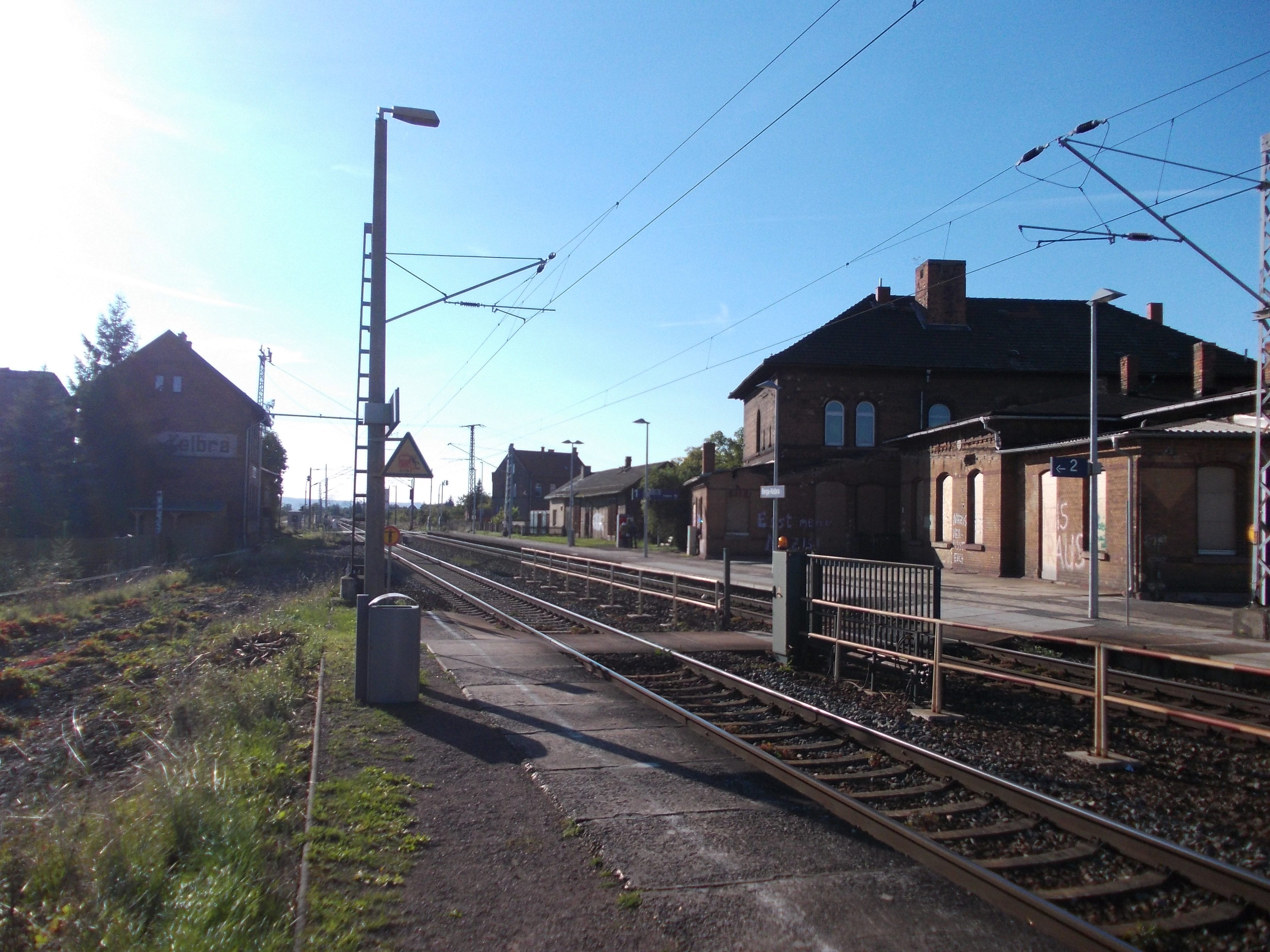
- 2013

General information
- Location: Bahnhofstr. 19, Berga, Saxony-Anhalt; Germany
- Coordinates: 51°27′08″N 11°00′56″E
- Owner: Deutsche Bahn
- Operator: DB Station&Service
- Lines: Halle–Kassel; former Berga-Kelbra–Stolberg; former Berga-Kelbra–Artern
- Platforms: 3

Construction
- Accessible: Yes

Other information
- Station code: 497
- DS100 code: UBK
- IBNR: 8010032
- Category: 6
- Website: www.bahnhof.de

History
- Opened: 1877

Services
Preceding station	Abellio Rail Mitteldeutschland	Following station
Nordhausen towards Leinefelde	RE 8	Sangerhausen towards Halle (Saale) Hbf
Görsbach towards Kassel-Wilhelmshöhe	RE 9	Roßla towards Halle (Saale) Hbf
Location
- Location within Saxony-Anhalt Location within Germany Location within Europe

Berga-Kelbra station is a keilbahnhof in the municipality of Berga and near Kelbra, which are both in the district of Mansfeld-Südharz in the German state of Saxony-Anhalt.

== History ==
The station is located on the territory of the municipality of Berga. It lies on the Halle–Hann. Münden railway, which was opened by the Magdeburg-Leipzig Railway Company (Magdeburg-Leipziger Eisenbahn-Gesellschaft) in 1866. However, the station was not opened until 1877.

From 1890 to 2011, it was the starting point for a branch line to Stolberg (Harz) and from 1916 to 1966 also for the Kyffhäuser Light Railway via Kelbra, Sittendorf, Tilleda and Hackpfüffel to Artern.

A fully occupied D-Zug (express train) on the line between Berga-Kelbra and Aumühle was attacked by American fighter-bombers on 21 February 1945. After they had blown up the locomotive’s steam boiler, they fired into the carriages. 40 people were killed immediately.

It is planned to renew the platforms and to build new platform accesses by 2018 at an estimated cost of €700,000.

== Rail services ==
In the 2025 timetable, Berga-Kelbra station is served by the following services:

Line	Route	Interval (min)	Operator
RE 9	Bitterfeld – Halle (Saale) – Lutherstadt Eisleben – Berga-Kelbra – Nordhausen – Kassel-Wilhelmshöhe	120	Abellio
RE 8	(Dessau –) Bitterfeld – Halle (Saale) – Lutherstadt Eisleben – Berga-Kelbra – Nordhausen – Leinefelde	120	Abellio

Buses run on state bus route 450 operated by Verkehrsgesellschaft Südharz from the station forecourt to Stolberg (Harz) via Rottleberode at two-hourly intervals. This bus route was established after the closure of passenger services on the Berga-Kelbra–Stolberg (Harz) railway.
