= Ingo Bodtke =

German politician (born 1965)

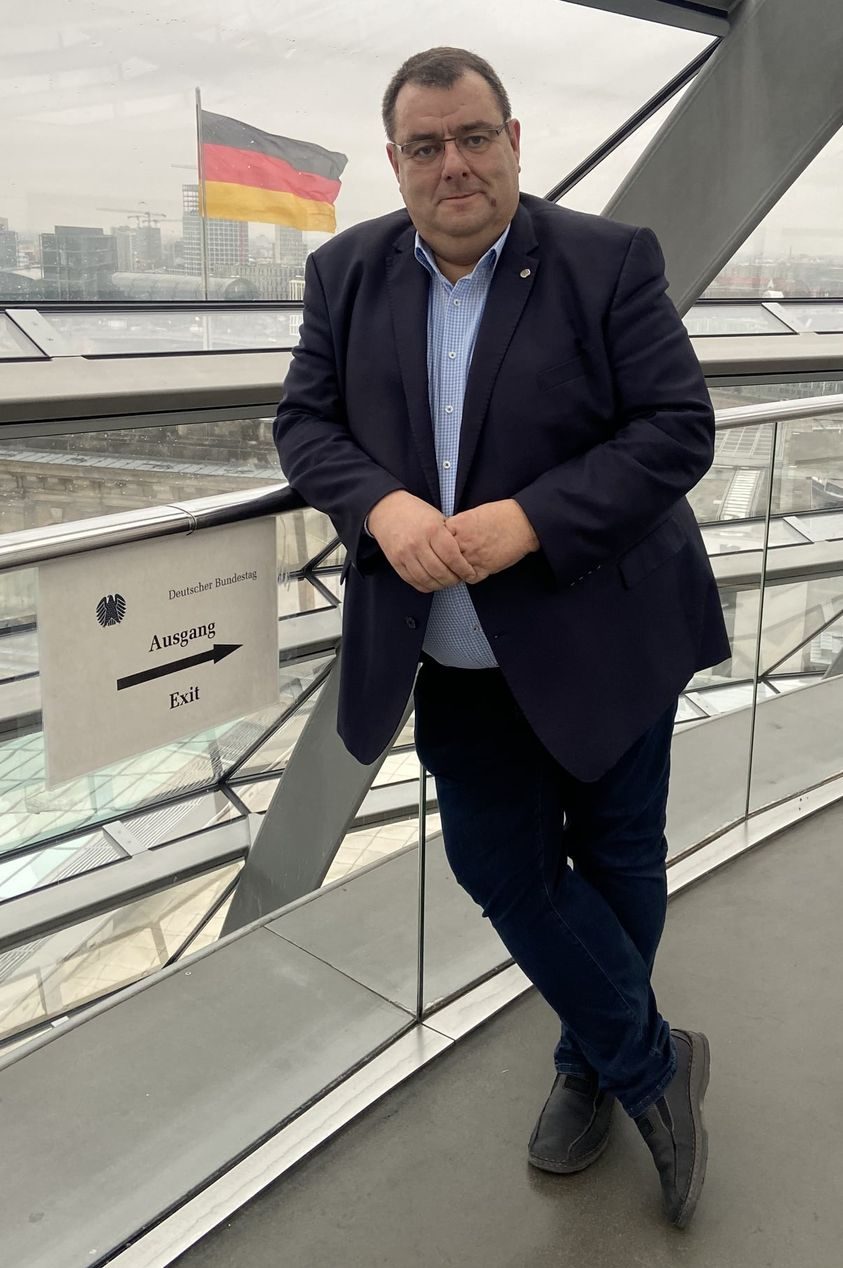
Ingo Bodtke in 2022.

Ingo Bodtke (born 6 June 1965 in Lutherstadt Eisleben) is a German politician from the Free Democratic Party (FDP) who served as a member of the German Bundestag from Saxony-Anhalt from 2021 to 2025.

== Early life and career ==
Ingo Bodtke grew up in a Christian home in the town of his birth. He completed an apprenticeship as a butcher and, after completing his basic military service, studied meat management and graduated as an engineer. He then worked as an instructor for insemination of cattle in animal breeding. He also worked in the insurance industry from 1987 and worked for LVM since 1990. Since the fall of the Berlin Wall, Bodtke has managed an insurance and financial agency as well as travel agencies.

== Political career ==
Bodtke is a member of the Wimmelburg municipal council.

In 2024, Bodtke announced that he isn't seeking re-election for Bundestag in the 2025 federal elections.

== Other activities ==
- Member of the supervisory board of Verkehrsgesellschaft Südharz mbH
- Conductor, organist and pastor at the New Apostolic Church in Hettstedt

== Personal life ==
Bodtke has been married since 1985 and is the father of four children.
