= Martinsrieth =

- Ortsteil of Wallhausen
- Interactive map of Martinsrieth
- Location within Germany Location within Saxony-Anhalt
- Coordinates: 51°25′N 11°13′E
- Country: Germany
- State: Saxony-Anhalt
- District: Mansfeld-Südharz
- Town: Wallhausen

Area
  - Total: 5.93 km^{2} (2.29 sq mi)
- Elevation: 126 m (413 ft)

Population (2006-12-31)
  - Total: 193
  - Density: 32.5/km^{2} (84.3/sq mi)
- Time zone: UTC+01:00 (CET)
  - Summer (DST): UTC+02:00 (CEST)
- Postal codes: 06528
- Dialling codes: 034656
- Vehicle registration: MSH
- Website: www.vwg-goldene-aue.de

Martinsrieth is a village and a former municipality in the Mansfeld-Südharz district, Saxony-Anhalt, Germany. Since 1 July 2009, it is part of the municipality Wallhausen.
