= Ritzgerode =

- Stadtteil of Mansfeld
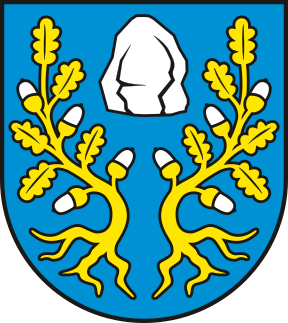
- Coat of arms
- Interactive map of Ritzgerode
- Location within Germany Location within Saxony-Anhalt
- Coordinates: 51°36′29″N 11°17′46″E
- Country: Germany
- State: Saxony-Anhalt
- District: Mansfeld-Südharz
- Town: Mansfeld

Area
  - Total: 2.46 km^{2} (0.95 sq mi)
- Elevation: 320 m (1,050 ft)

Population (2006-12-31)
  - Total: 87
  - Density: 35/km^{2} (92/sq mi)
- Time zone: UTC+01:00 (CET)
  - Summer (DST): UTC+02:00 (CEST)
- Postal codes: 06543
- Dialling codes: 034775
- Vehicle registration: MSH

Ritzgerode is a village and a former municipality in the Mansfeld-Südharz district, Saxony-Anhalt, Germany. Since 6 March 2009, it has been part of the town of Mansfeld.
