= Justi =

Justi is a surname. Notable people with the surname include:

- Carl Justi (1832–1912), German art historian
- Ferdinand Justi (1837–1907), German linguist and Orientalist
- Johann Heinrich Gottlob Justi (1717–1771), German political economist
