= List of Lutheran-Reformed primary schools =

List of Lutheran-Reformed primary schools is a list of primary schools, that are associated officially with a Protestant Christian denomination resulting from a merger of Lutheran and Calvinist churches.

== Germany ==
=== Berlin ===
- Evangelische Grundschule Berlin-Mitte, Berlin
- Evangelische Grundschule Friedrichshagen, Berlin
- Evangelische Schule Pankow, Berlin
- Evangelische Grundschule Wilmersdorf, Berlin
- Evangelische Grundschule Zehlendorf, Berlin

=== Brandenburg ===
- Evangelische Grundschule Bernau, Bernau
- Evangelische Grundschule Brandenburg, Brandenburg an der Havel
- Evangelische Gottfried-Forck-Grundschule, Cottbus
- Evangelische Grundschule Forst, Forst (Lausitz)
- Evangelische Grundschule Finsterwalde, Finsterwalde
- Evangelische Grundschule Frankfurt (Oder), Frankfurt (Oder)
- Evangelische Grundschule Babelsberg, Potsdam
- Evangelische Grundschule Potsdam, Potsdam
- Evangelische Grundschule Schwedt, Schwedt
- Evangelische Grundschule Tröbitz, Tröbitz
- Evangelische Grundschule Werder, Werder (Havel)

=== Mecklenburg-Western Pomerania ===
- Evangelische Grundschule Neustrelitz, Neustrelitz

=== North Rhine-Westphalia ===
- Grundschule an der Lippeaue, Bad Lippspringe
- Evangelische Grundschule Bensberg, Bergisch Gladbach
- Albert-Schweitzer-Schule, Bottrop
- Ernst-Moritz-Arndt-Schule, Burscheid
- EMAnuel Grundschule, Cologne
- Evangelische Grundschule Waldstraße, Duisburg
- Hanna-Zürndorfer-Schule, Düsseldorf
- Friedrich-von-Bodelschwingh, Düsseldorf
- Elsa-Brandström-Schule, Düsseldorf
- Evangelische Grundschule Schwanenberg, Erkelenz
- Evangelische Grundschule Stadtmitte, Eschweiler
- Käthe-Kollwitz-Schule, Essen
- Theodor-Heuss-Schule, Essen
- Paul-Gerhardt-Schule, Euskirchen
- Martin-Luther-Schule, Gelsenkirchen
- Evangelische Grundschule Sundern, Hiddenhausen
- Dudenrothschule, Holzwickede
- Bodelschwingh-Schule, Hürth
- Evangelische Schule Kerpen, Kerpen
- Evangelische Grundschule Pahlkestraße, Mönchengladbach
- Lutherschule, Paderborn
- Dietrich-Bonhoeffer-Schule, Pulheim
- Evangelische Grundschule Hangelar, Sankt Augustin
- Evangelische Martin Luther-Grundschule, Werdohl

=== Rhineland-Palatinate ===
- Evangelische Grundschule Mogendorf und Nordhofen, Mogendorf

=== Saxony-Anhalt ===
- Evangelische Grundschule Wolfen, Bitterfeld-Wolfen
- Evangelische Grundschule Burg, Burg
- Evangelische Grundschule Dessau, Dessau-Rosslau
- Evangelische Grundschule Gardelegen, Gardelegen
- Evangelische Grundschule Halberstadt Sankt Laurentius, Halberstadt
- Evangelische Grundschule Hettstedt, Hettstedt
- Evangelische Grundschule Köthen, Köthen
- Evangelische Grundschule Magdeburg, Magdeburg
- Evangelische Grundschule Stephan Praetorius, Salzwedel
- Evangelische Grundschule Rathmannsdorf, Stassfurt
- Evangelische Grundschule Wittenberg, Wittenberg

=== Thuringia ===
- Evangelische Grundschule Bad Langensalza, Bad Langensalza
- Evangelische Grundschule Erfurt, Erfurt
