= Riethnordhausen =

Riethnordhausen may refer to the following places in Germany:

- Riethnordhausen, Saxony-Anhalt
- Riethnordhausen, Thuringia
