= Hermerode =

- Stadtteil of Mansfeld
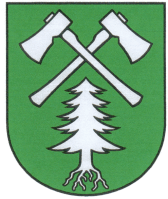
- Coat of arms
- Interactive map of Hermerode
- Location within Germany Location within Saxony-Anhalt
- Coordinates: 51°36′N 11°17′E
- Country: Germany
- State: Saxony-Anhalt
- District: Mansfeld-Südharz
- Town: Mansfeld

Area
  - Total: 4.06 km^{2} (1.57 sq mi)
- Elevation: 326 m (1,070 ft)

Population (2006-12-31)
  - Total: 127
  - Density: 31.3/km^{2} (81.0/sq mi)
- Time zone: UTC+01:00 (CET)
  - Summer (DST): UTC+02:00 (CEST)
- Postal codes: 06543
- Dialling codes: 034775

Hermerode is a village and a former municipality in the Mansfeld-Südharz district, Saxony-Anhalt, Germany. Since 6 March 2009, it is part of the town Mansfeld.
