= Mansfelder Grund-Helbra =

Collective municipality in Saxony-Anhalt, Germany

- Verbandsgemeinde
- Flag

- Map of Mansfeld-Südharz highlighting Mansfelder Grund-Helbra
- Interactive map of Mansfelder Grund-Helbra
- Location within Germany Location within Saxony-Anhalt
- Coordinates: 51°33′N 11°30′E
- Country: Germany
- State: Saxony-Anhalt
- District: Mansfeld-Südharz
- Seat: Helbra
- Subdivisions: 8 municipalities

Area
  - Total: 71.23 km^{2} (27.50 sq mi)

Population (2025-12-31)
  - Total: 13,423
  - Density: 188.4/km^{2} (488.1/sq mi)
- Time zone: UTC+01:00 (CET)
  - Summer (DST): UTC+02:00 (CEST)
- Website: www.verwaltungsamt-helbra.de

Mansfelder Grund-Helbra is a Verbandsgemeinde ("collective municipality") in the Mansfeld-Südharz district, in Saxony-Anhalt, Germany. Before 1 January 2010, it was a Verwaltungsgemeinschaft. It is situated between Eisleben and Mansfeld. The seat of the Verbandsgemeinde is in Helbra.

The Verbandsgemeinde Mansfelder Grund-Helbra consists of the following municipalities:

1. Ahlsdorf
2. Benndorf
3. Blankenheim
4. Bornstedt
5. Helbra
6. Hergisdorf
7. Klostermansfeld
8. Wimmelburg
