= Ilsenburg Abbey =

Former abbey of the Benedictine Order in Ilsenburg, Saxony-Anhalt, Germany

- Kloster Ilsenburg
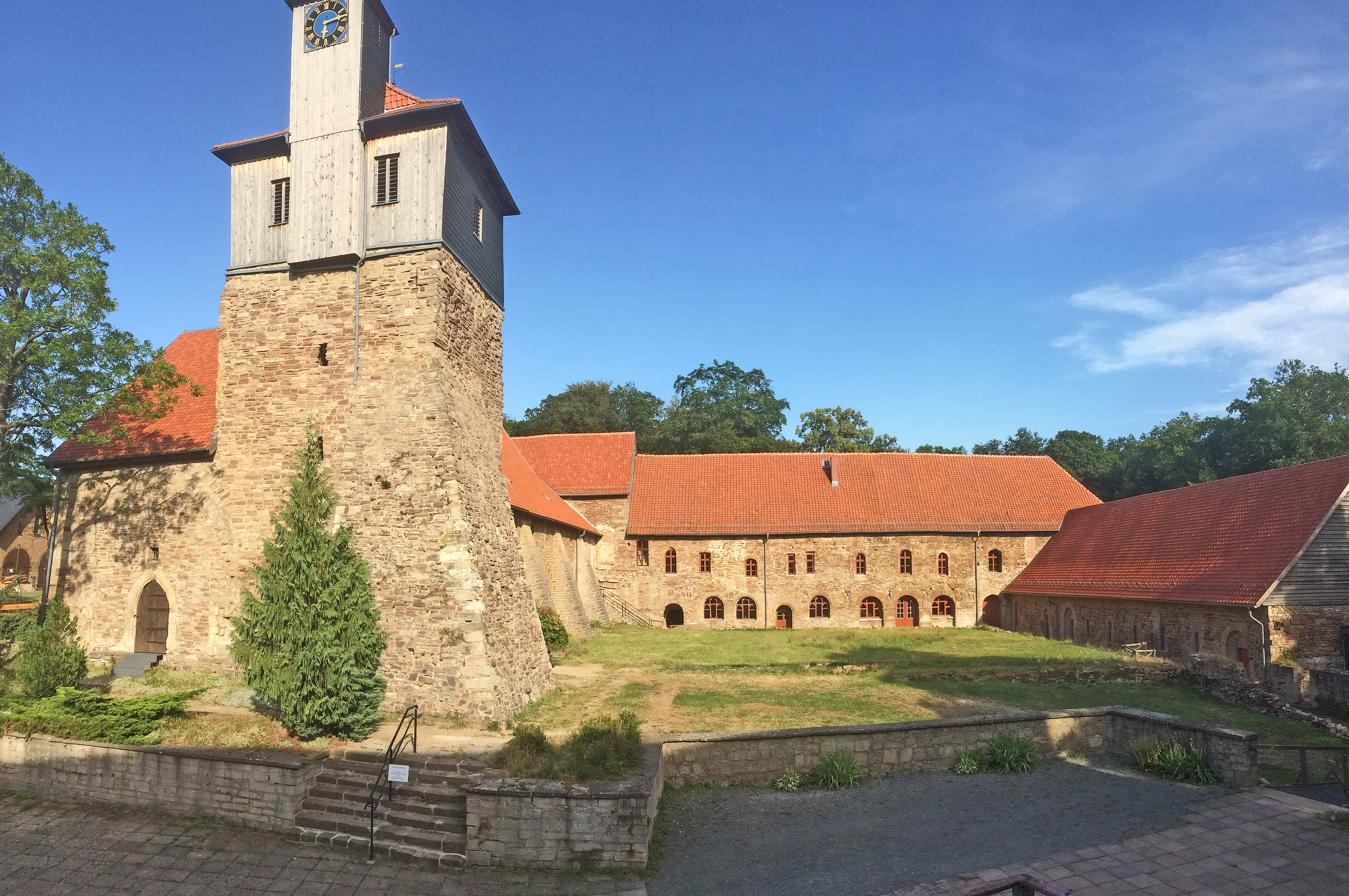
- Ilsenburg Abbey

- Location within Saxony-Anhalt Location within Germany

Religion
- Affiliation: Catholic
- Sect: Benedictines

Location
- Location: Ilsenburg, Saxony-Anhalt, Germany
- Country: Germany
- Coordinates: 51°51′35″N 10°40′43″E

Architecture
- Completed: 995

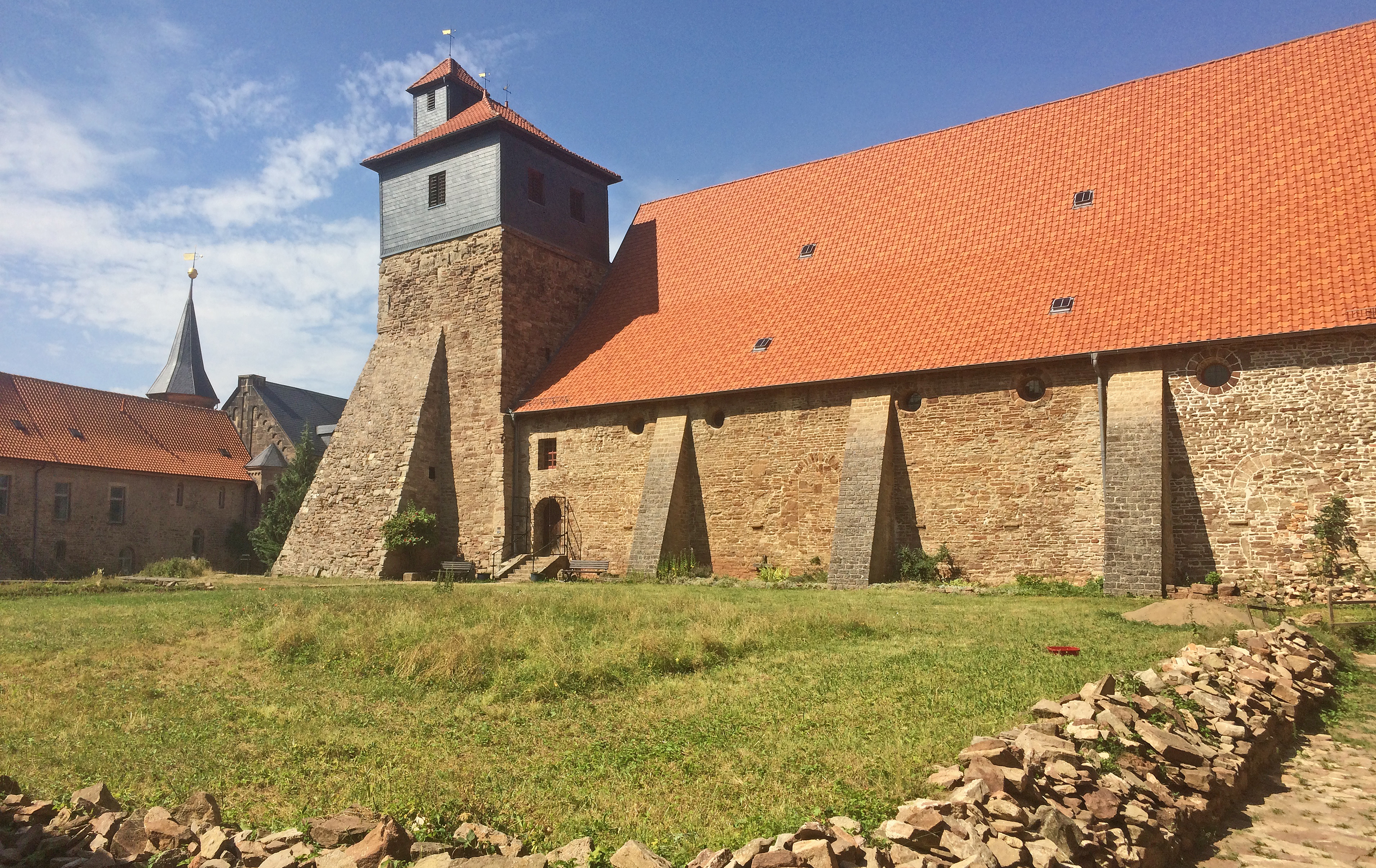
Abbey church

Ilsenburg Abbey (German: Kloster Ilsenburg) was a monastery of the Benedictine Order located at Ilsenburg near Wernigerode, in Saxony-Anhalt in Germany. The former abbey is a stop on the Romanesque Road.

== History ==
The monastery was built in the Saxon lands of Eastphalia at the site of a former Pfalz and hunting lodge, mentioned as Elysynaburg in a 995 deed issued by King Otto III. On 15 April 1003 King Henry II donated the estate for this purpose to the Bishop of Halberstadt, and the abbey had been founded by 1009. In 1018 the Halberstadt bishop vested the monastery with further possessions around Ilsenburg and Osterwieck. The first monks possibly descended from Fulda Abbey in Franconia.

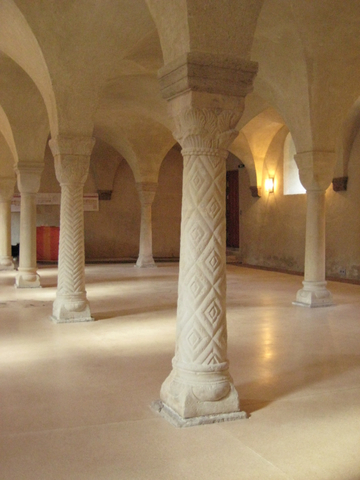
Refectory

Fostered by Bishop Burchard II of Halberstadt from about 1070, the convent experienced a flourishing period whereupon numerous filial monasteries were established, such as Huysburg, and the abbeys of Harsefeld, Hillersleben, and Wimmelburg. A larger Romanesque church was erected and dedicated to Sts Peter and Paul on 5 June 1087; including the oldest preserved three-aisled choir of all Benedictine sacral buildings in Germany. The adjacent cloister buildings were erected after a blaze in 1120 and finished in 1176. The monastic community included up to 25 monks, it joined the Benedictine Bursfelde Congregation in 1464/65.

The Vögte, or lords protectors, were the Counts of Wernigerode until 1429, when on their extinction their inheritance passed to the Counts of Stolberg, who were supporters of Lutheranism when the Reformation spread throughout the country. During the Peasants' War in 1525 it was stormed, plundered and largely demolished by rebellious peasants; the monks were driven away, and did not return for several months.

From 1546 onwards the abbey turned Protestant and was subjected to severe changes; in 1555 it became, with its properties and assets, part of the territorial possessions of the Counts. The northern part of the church was demolished in 1573; part of the premises was used for a choral school, as in other monastic properties acquired by the Counts, and considerable re-building and improvements were made for the better accommodation of the function. The Counts' financial difficulties however caused the school to be suspended while the property was mortgaged, and although they regained it in 1608, and indeed lived there themselves for some years, the school finally closed in 1626.

After the Counts finally relocated their residence to Wernigerode in 1716, also the cloister buildings were demolished and the premises were used for commercial purposes. The monastery remained a possession of the House of Stolberg even after the County of Stolberg-Wernigerode was mediatised and incorporated into the Prussian Province of Saxony in 1815. The Ilsenburg manor was finally disseized after World War II in the course of the land reform during Soviet occupation.

Today, the abbey site with its preserved buildings and the adjacent Ilsenburg House, built from 1861 at the behest of Count Otto zu Stolberg-Wernigerode, are managed by the Ilsenburg Abbey Foundation (Stiftung Kloster Ilsenburg).

== Garden dreams ==
Ilsenburg Abbey and Palace Garden (Harz) are part of the Saxony-Anhalt Garden Dreams project.
