= Riethnordhausen, Saxony-Anhalt =

Riethnordhausen
- Ortsteil of Wallhausen
- Interactive map of Riethnordhausen
- Location within Germany Location within Saxony-Anhalt
- Coordinates: 51°25′N 11°13′E
- Country: Germany
- State: Saxony-Anhalt
- District: Mansfeld-Südharz
- Town: Wallhausen

Area
  - Total: 6.79 km^{2} (2.62 sq mi)
- Elevation: 141 m (463 ft)

Population (2006-12-31)
  - Total: 563
  - Density: 82.9/km^{2} (215/sq mi)
- Time zone: UTC+01:00 (CET)
  - Summer (DST): UTC+02:00 (CEST)
- Postal codes: 06528
- Dialling codes: 0346456
- Vehicle registration: MSH
- Website: www.vwg-goldene-aue.de

Riethnordhausen is a village and a former municipality in the Mansfeld-Südharz district, Saxony-Anhalt, Germany. Since 1 July 2009, it is part of the municipality Wallhausen.

== Geography ==
Riethnordhausen is situated in the Rieth in the lower Helme valley, north-east of the Kyffhäuser and south-west of Sangerhausen, the capital of the Mansfeld-Südharz, from which the connecting road leads to the place, which crosses here with the road between Kelbra and Artern.
