= Hackpfüffel =

- Ortsteil of Brücken-Hackpfüffel
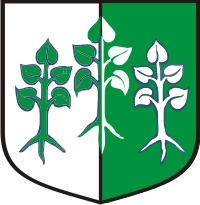
- Coat of arms
- Interactive map of Hackpfüffel
- Location within Germany Location within Saxony-Anhalt
- Coordinates: 51°25′N 11°11′E
- Country: Germany
- State: Saxony-Anhalt
- District: Mansfeld-Südharz
- Town: Brücken-Hackpfüffel

Area
  - Total: 5.73 km^{2} (2.21 sq mi)
- Elevation: 148 m (486 ft)

Population (2006-12-31)
  - Total: 262
  - Density: 45.7/km^{2} (118/sq mi)
- Time zone: UTC+01:00 (CET)
  - Summer (DST): UTC+02:00 (CEST)
- Postal codes: 06528
- Dialling codes: 034656
- Vehicle registration: MSH
- Website: www.vwg-goldene-aue.de

Hackpfüffel is a village and a former municipality in the Mansfeld-Südharz district, in Saxony-Anhalt, Germany. Since 1 January 2009, it is part of the municipality Brücken-Hackpfüffel.

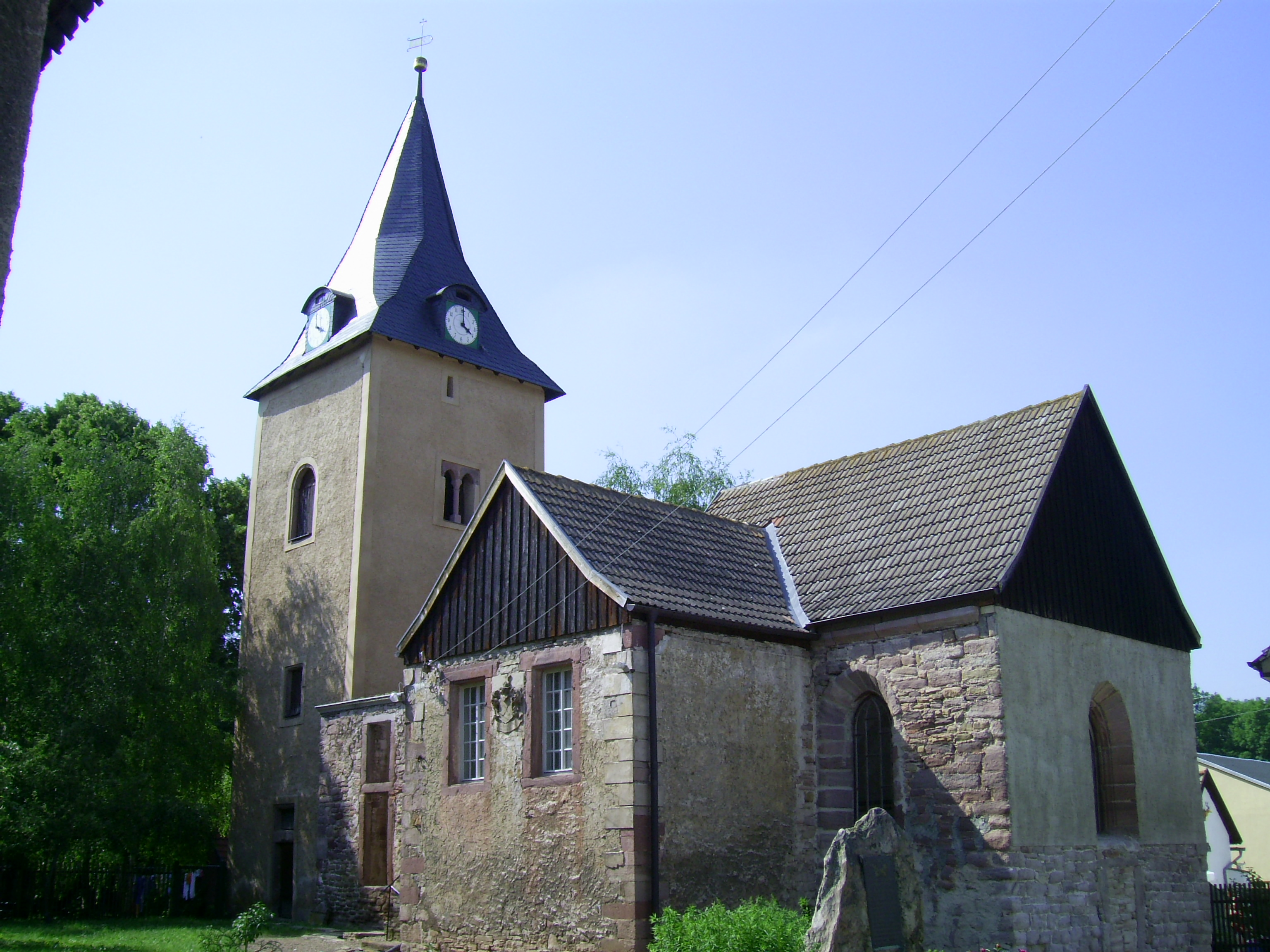
Hackpfüffel Church

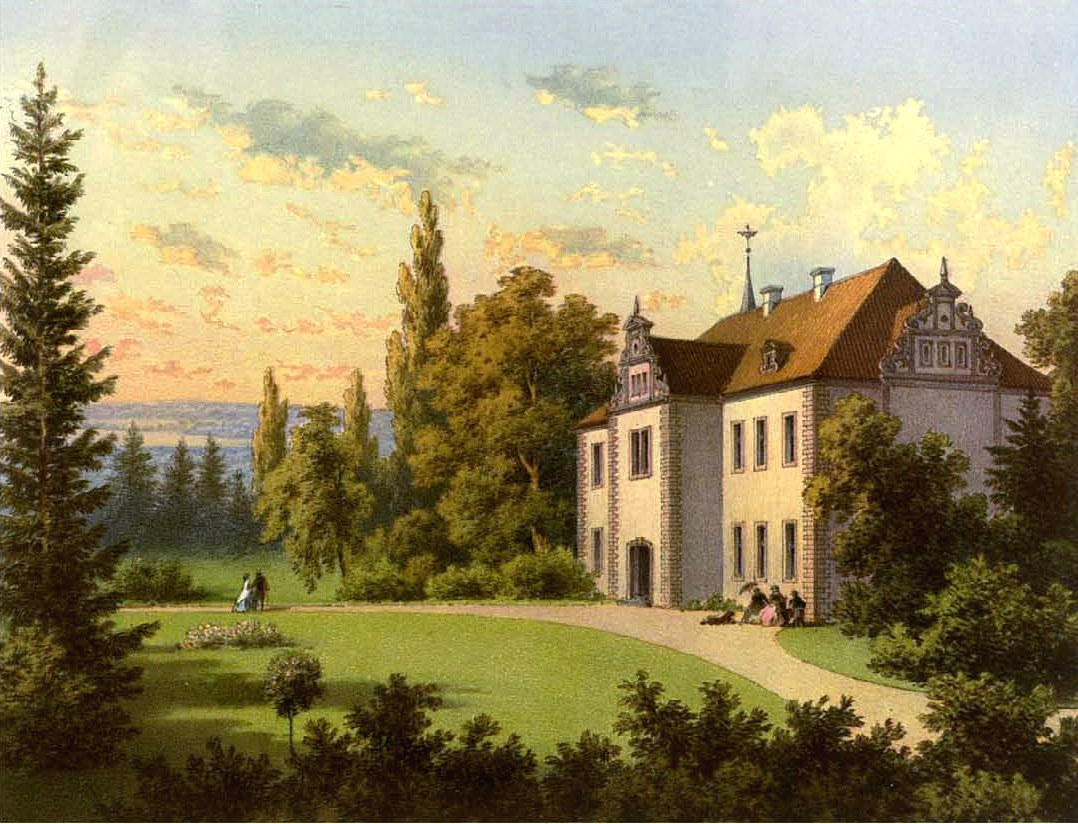
Schloss Hackpfüffel in 1860, Alexander Duncker collection

== Geographical Location ==
Hackpfüffel lies in the so-called Rieth in the lower Helme valley, north-east of the Kyffhäuser. The road between Kelbra and Artern goes through the town.

== History ==
=== Origins ===
In the year 899, the place was first mentioned as Bablide (German: Place on the swamp) erwähnt. In the year 1131, it was documented as Pefelde. At the beginning of the 13th Century, the place was in the possession of the Imperial Knight Thomas von Wallhausen. After 1231 Hackpfüffel was known as imperial estate Peflede. Variant spellings included Pefeld (1273) and Pefelde (1279).

In 1314 Hackpfüffel was split from Amt Brücken. On 23 April 1314 Fürst Otto II. von Anhalt pledged the village Pfeffele with all rights, except fiefdom of the church, for 70 Marks of Nordhäusen silver to Heinrich von Gehofen and his cousin Heinrich and Hermann Ha(c)ke. Since then the representatives of the family Hacke were in situ and the name of the family was added to the place name. So in 1436 the representation Hackinpfeffelde was used.

=== Historical population ===
Year	Inhabitants
1817	298
1858	378
1905	346
1933	368
1937	336
1965	424
1969	394
1992	310
1993	309
1994	295
1997	277
2006	259
2007	260
