= Brücken =

Brücken or Brucken may refer to:

== Places in Germany ==
- Brücken, Birkenfeld, municipality in the district of Birkenfeld, Rhineland-Palatinate
- Brücken, Kusel, municipality in the district of Kusel, Rhineland-Palatinate
- Brücken, Saxony-Anhalt, municipality in the district of Mansfeld-Südharz, Saxony-Anhalt

== People ==
- Claudia Brücken (born 1963), German singer who fronted the groups Propaganda and Act
- Gerard von Brucken Fock (1859–1935), classical Dutch pianist, composer and painter
