= Walbeck =

Walbeck may refer to the following places in Germany:

- Walbeck, Börde, a municipality in the Börde district, Saxony-Anhalt
- Walbeck, Mansfeld-Südharz, a municipality in the Mansfeld-Südharz district, Saxony-Anhalt
- Walbeck (Geldern), a village in the municipality Geldern, North Rhine-Westphalia

== See also ==
- Counts of Walbeck
