= Piskaborn =

Coordinates: 51.5833°N 11.3675°E

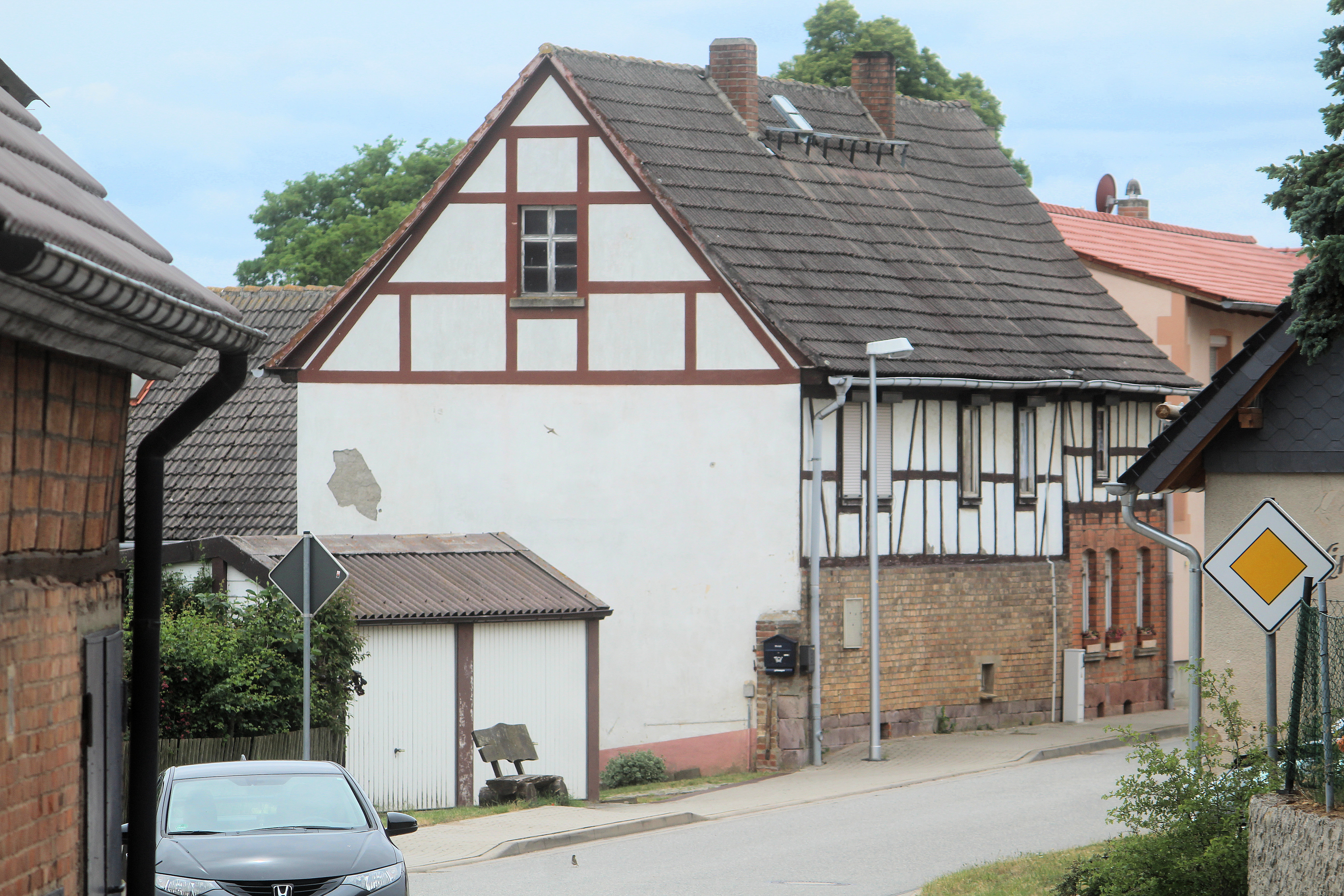

Piskaborn is a subdivision (Ortschaft) of the town Mansfeld in Saxony-Anhalt, Germany. It was an independent municipality until 2005. The village has about 300 inhabitants and is situated in the valley of the Wipper.
