= Bornstedt, Mansfeld-Südharz =

Bornstedt
- Municipality
- Location of Bornstedt within Mansfeld-Südharz district
- Interactive map of Bornstedt
- Location within Germany Location within Saxony-Anhalt
- Coordinates: 51°29′N 11°29′E
- Country: Germany
- State: Saxony-Anhalt
- District: Mansfeld-Südharz
- Municipal assoc.: Mansfelder Grund-Helbra

Government
  - Mayor (2022–29): Lars Rose

Area
  - Total: 9.31 km^{2} (3.59 sq mi)
- Elevation: 217 m (712 ft)

Population (2025-12-31)
  - Total: 766
  - Density: 82.3/km^{2} (213/sq mi)
- Time zone: UTC+01:00 (CET)
  - Summer (DST): UTC+02:00 (CEST)
- Postal codes: 06295
- Dialling codes: 03475
- Vehicle registration: MSH

Bornstedt (German pronunciation: [ˈbɔʁnʃtɛt]) is a municipality in the Mansfeld-Südharz district, Saxony-Anhalt, Germany.
