= Brücken, Saxony-Anhalt =

Brücken
- Ortsteil of Brücken-Hackpfüffel
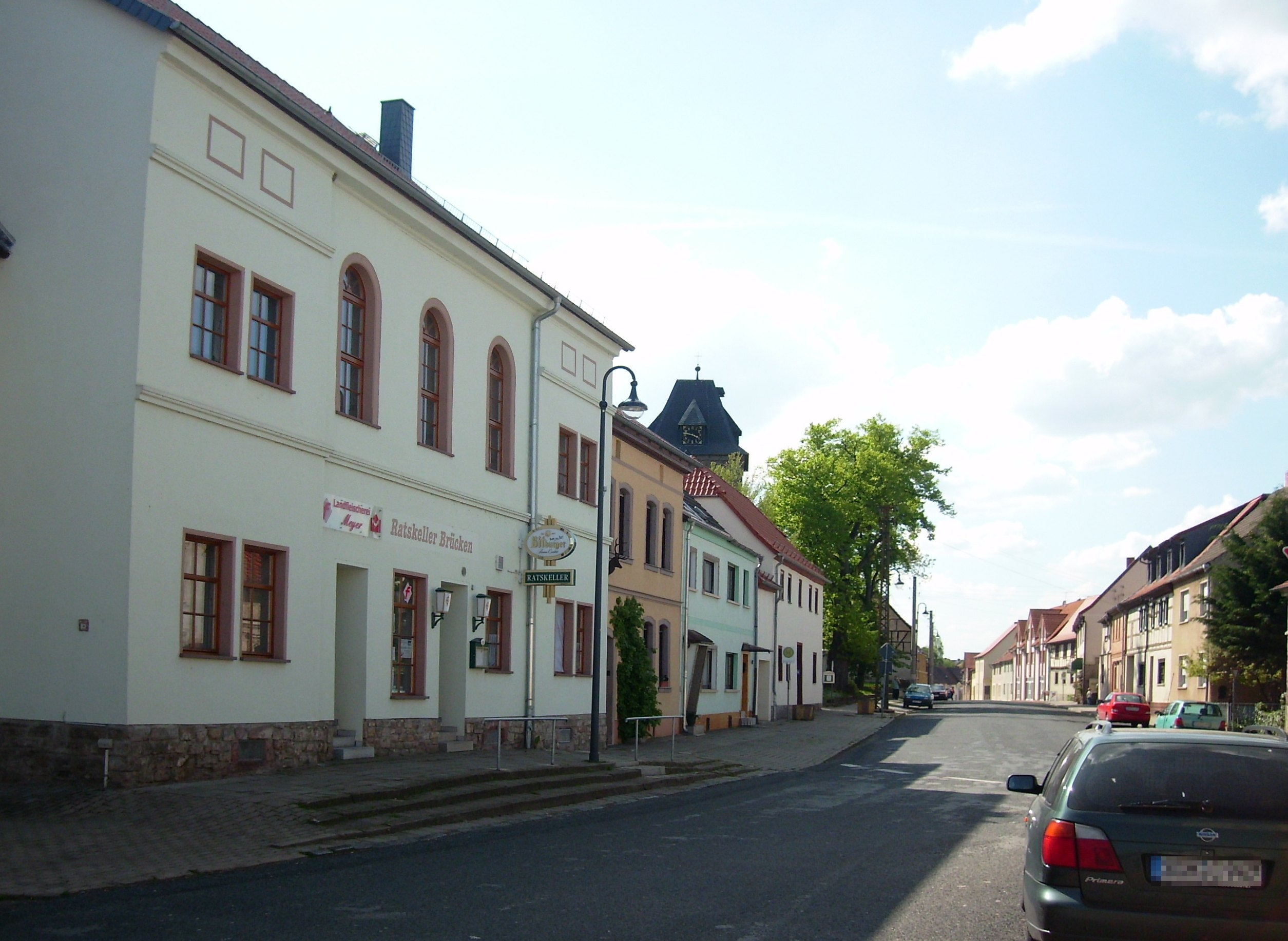
- Hauptstrasse with Ratskeller restaurant in Brücken-Hackpfüffel
- Interactive map of Brücken
- Location within Germany Location within Saxony-Anhalt
- Coordinates: 51°26′40″N 11°11′55″E
- Country: Germany
- State: Saxony-Anhalt
- District: Mansfeld-Südharz
- Town: Brücken-Hackpfüffel

Area
  - Total: 10.92 km^{2} (4.22 sq mi)
- Elevation: 131 m (430 ft)

Population (2006-12-31)
  - Total: 908
  - Density: 83.2/km^{2} (215/sq mi)
- Time zone: UTC+01:00 (CET)
  - Summer (DST): UTC+02:00 (CEST)
- Postal codes: 06528
- Dialling codes: 034656
- Vehicle registration: MSH
- Website: www.vwg-goldene-aue.de

Brücken (German pronunciation: [ˈbʁʏkn̩]) is a village and a former municipality in the Mansfeld-Südharz district, in Saxony-Anhalt, Germany. Since 1 January 2009, it is part of the municipality Brücken-Hackpfüffel.

== History ==
Brücken was referenced in a document at Hersfeld Abbey as Trizzebruccun at the start of the 9th Century.

The settlement of Brücken was awarded a town charter in 1518 by Kaiser Maximilian I, however this was withdrawn in the following centuries.

Brücken was occupied by US troops in April 1945, which were relieved by the Red Army in July of the same year.

== Famous Residents ==
Johann Heinrich Gottlob von Justi (1717 - 1771), political economist, was born in the town
