= Wallhausen, Saxony-Anhalt =

Wallhausen
- Municipality
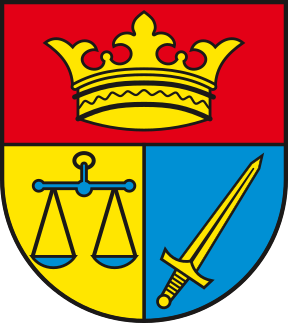
- Coat of arms

- Location of Wallhausen within Mansfeld-Südharz district
- Interactive map of Wallhausen
- Location within Germany Location within Saxony-Anhalt
- Coordinates: 51°27′39″N 11°12′26″E
- Country: Germany
- State: Saxony-Anhalt
- District: Mansfeld-Südharz
- Subdivisions: 4

Government
  - Mayor (2022–29): Dieter Gremmer

Area
  - Total: 35.34 km^{2} (13.64 sq mi)
- Elevation: 141 m (463 ft)

Population (2025-12-31)
  - Total: 2,330
  - Density: 65.9/km^{2} (171/sq mi)
- Time zone: UTC+01:00 (CET)
  - Summer (DST): UTC+02:00 (CEST)
- Postal codes: 06528
- Dialling codes: 034656
- Vehicle registration: MSH, EIL, HET, ML, SGH
- Website: www.wallhausen-helme.de

Wallhausen (German pronunciation: [ˈvalˌhaʊzn̩]) is a municipality in the Mansfeld-Südharz district of Saxony-Anhalt, Germany. It is located on the Helme river north of the Kyffhäuser mountain range and the border with Thuringia. Wallhausen is part of the Verbandsgemeinde ("collective municipality") Goldene Aue. The municipality consists of the 4 villages Wallhausen, Hohlstedt, Martinsrieth and Riethnordhausen. The former municipalities Martinsrieth and Riethnordhausen were absorbed into Wallhausen in July 2009.

In 909 Henry the Fowler, the son of Duke Otto I of Saxony, married Matilda at the Pfalz of Wallhausen, their son Otto was possibly born here in 912. King Otto III gave the castle to his aunt Abbess Matilda of Quedlinburg in 985. Wallhausen later was a possession of the Saxon Electorate, it became part of the Prussian Province of Saxony in 1815. Wallhausen Castle was owned by the House of Asseburg from 1414 until the expropriation in the Soviet occupation zone in 1945.

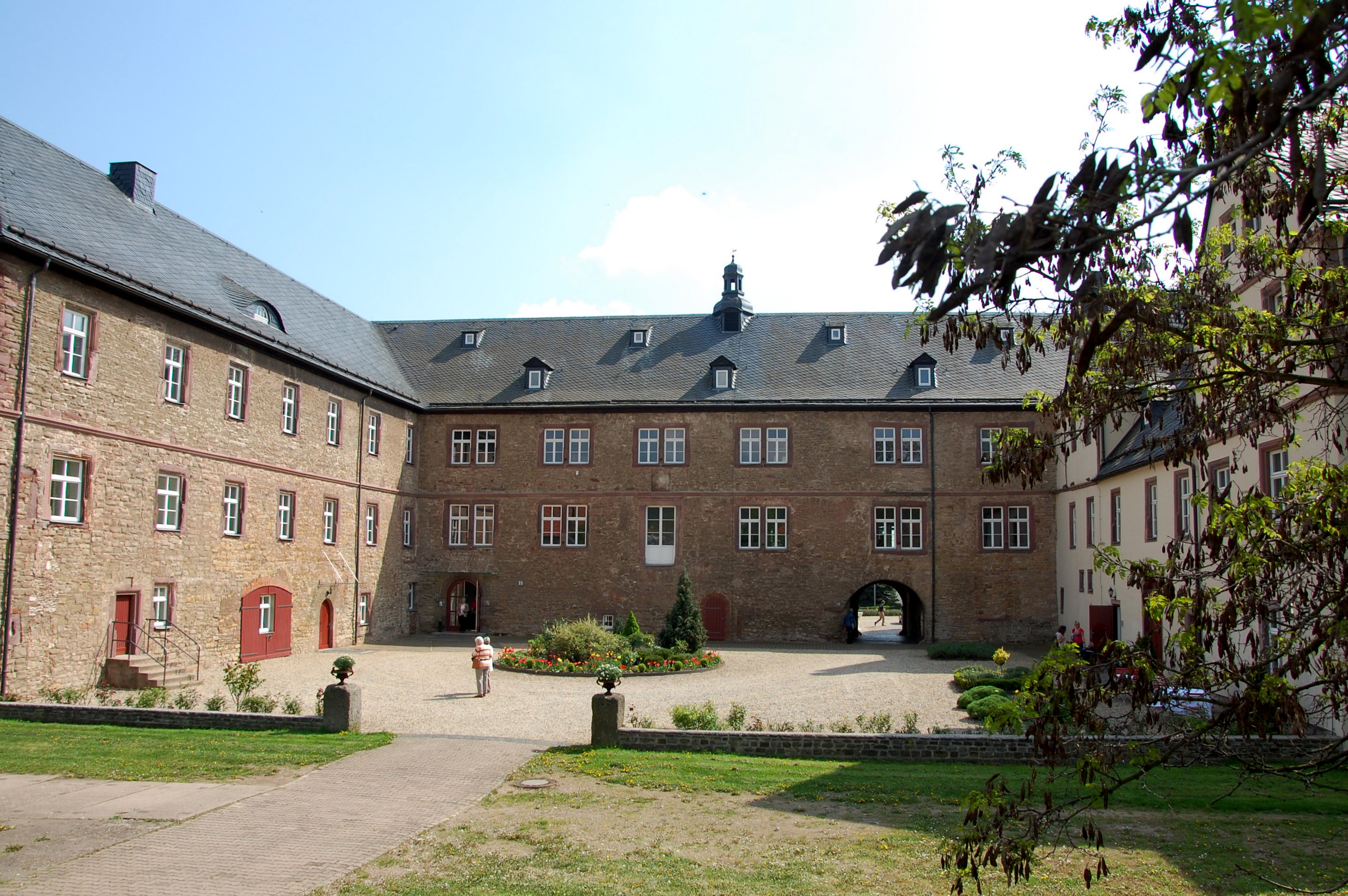
Wallhausen Castle
