= Blankenheim, Saxony-Anhalt =

Blankenheim
- Municipality
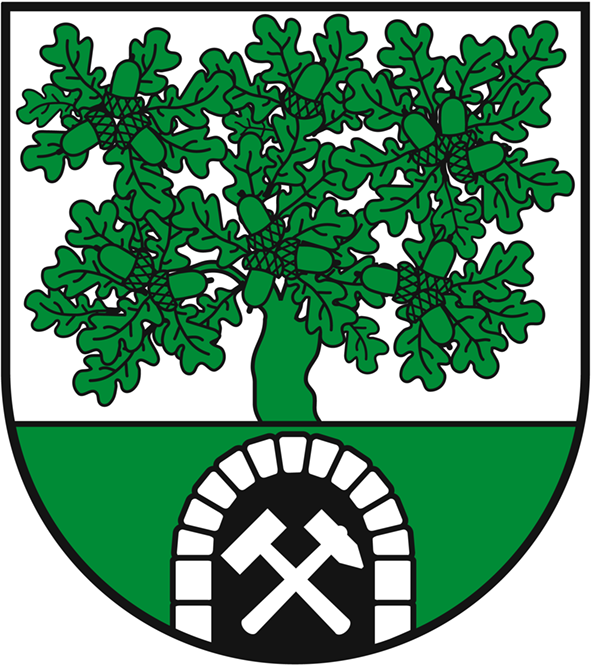
- Coat of arms

- Location of Blankenheim within Mansfeld-Südharz district
- Interactive map of Blankenheim
- Location within Germany Location within Saxony-Anhalt
- Coordinates: 51°30′27″N 11°25′51″E
- Country: Germany
- State: Saxony-Anhalt
- District: Mansfeld-Südharz
- Municipal assoc.: Mansfelder Grund-Helbra

Government
  - Mayor (2020–27): André Strobach (FDP)

Area
  - Total: 14.85 km^{2} (5.73 sq mi)
- Elevation: 280 m (920 ft)

Population (2025-12-31)
  - Total: 1,118
  - Density: 75.29/km^{2} (195.0/sq mi)
- Time zone: UTC+01:00 (CET)
  - Summer (DST): UTC+02:00 (CEST)
- Postal codes: 06528
- Dialling codes: 034659
- Vehicle registration: MSH, EIL, HET, ML, SGH

Blankenheim (German pronunciation: [ˈblaŋkn̩haɪm]) is a municipality in the Mansfeld-Südharz district, Saxony-Anhalt, Germany.

== History ==
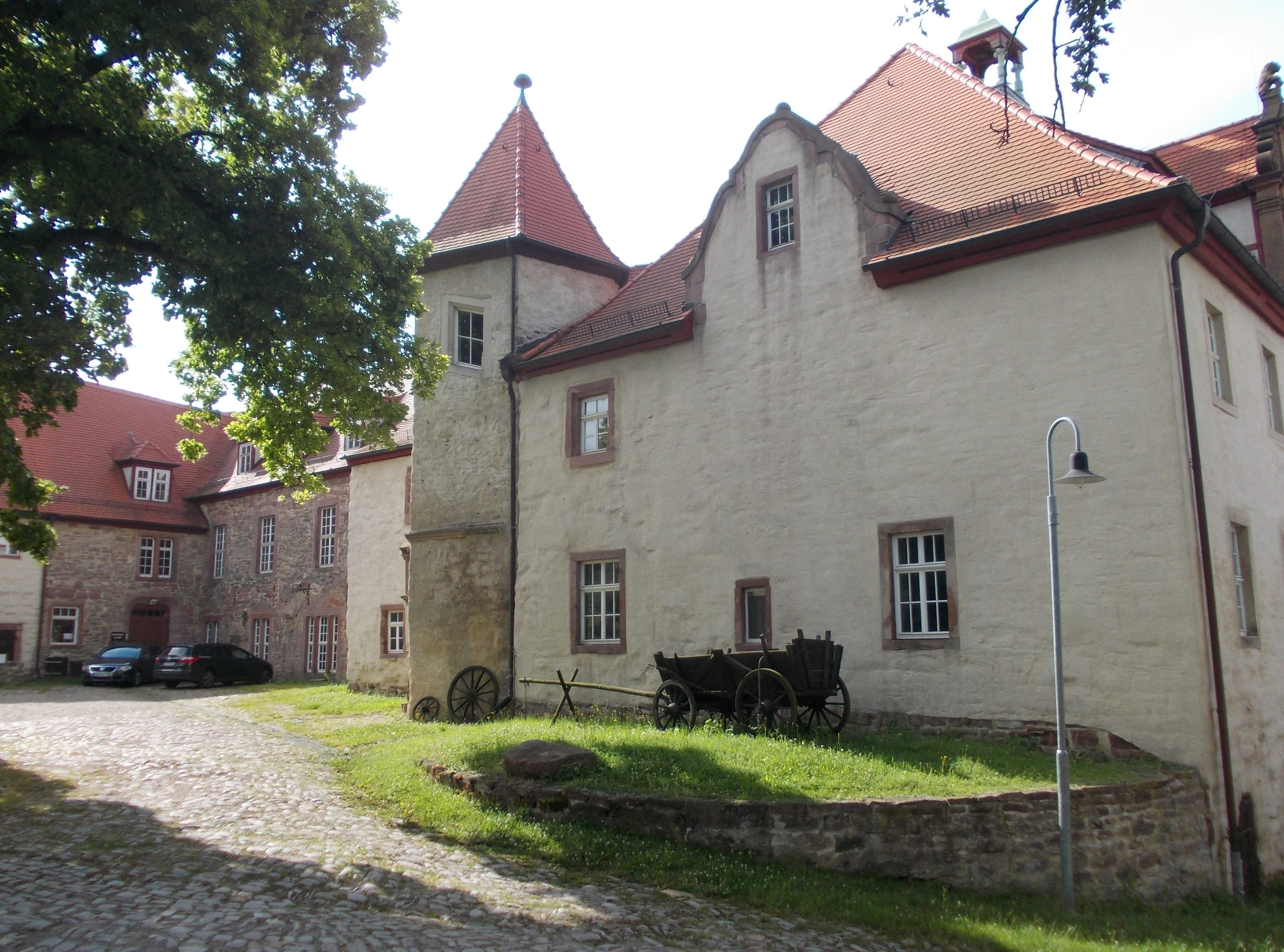
Klosterrode monastery

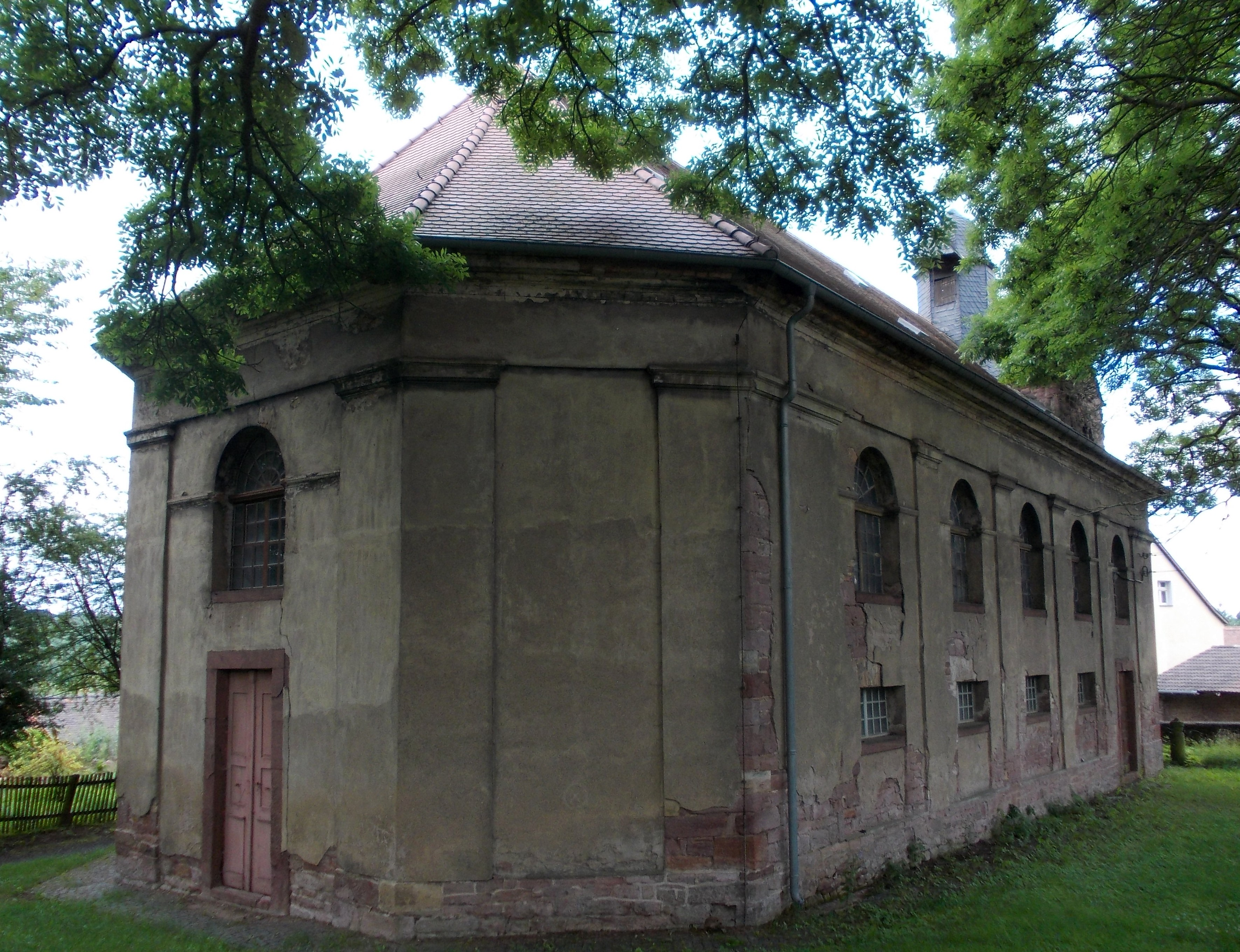
St. Lamberti Chapel in Blankenheim

The earliest known documented mention of Blankenheim dates from 1181. The development of the place was closely connected to the history of the Premonstratenian monastery Rode in the modern-day Klosterrode.
