= Ahlsdorf =

- Municipality
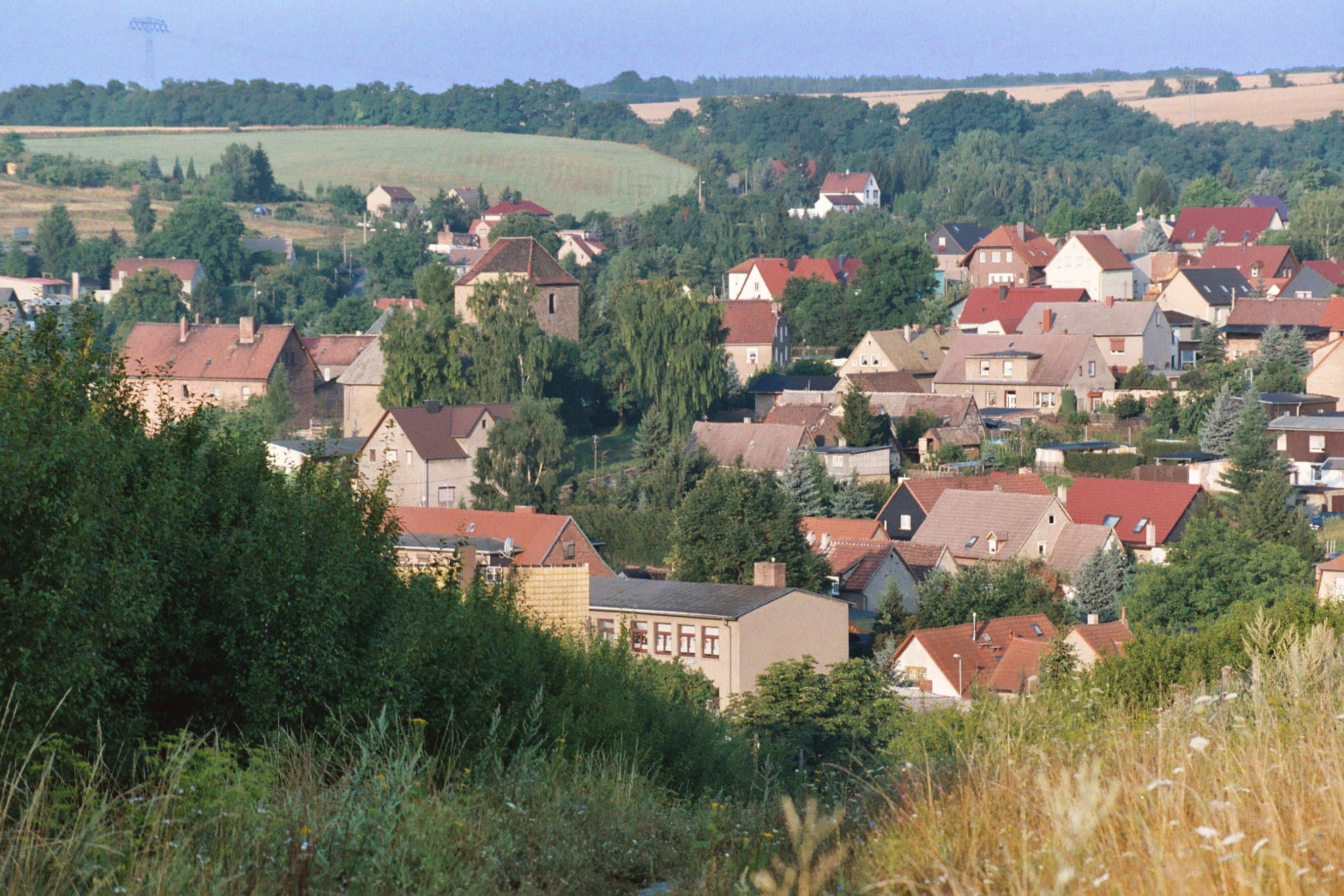

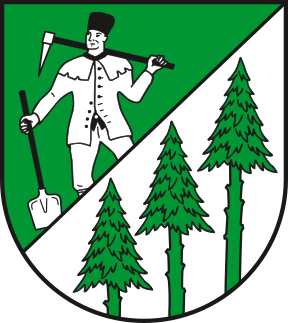
- Coat of arms

- Location of Ahlsdorf within Mansfeld-Südharz district
- Interactive map of Ahlsdorf
- Location within Germany Location within Saxony-Anhalt
- Coordinates: 51°33′N 11°28′E
- Country: Germany
- State: Saxony-Anhalt
- District: Mansfeld-Südharz
- Municipal assoc.: Mansfelder Grund-Helbra

Government
  - Mayor (2022–29): Karsten Patz

Area
  - Total: 5.09 km^{2} (1.97 sq mi)
- Elevation: 206 m (676 ft)

Population (2025-12-31)
  - Total: 1,489
  - Density: 293/km^{2} (758/sq mi)
- Time zone: UTC+01:00 (CET)
  - Summer (DST): UTC+02:00 (CEST)
- Postal codes: 06313
- Dialling codes: 034772
- Vehicle registration: MSH

Ahlsdorf is a municipality in the Mansfeld-Südharz district, Saxony-Anhalt, Germany.
