= Benndorf =

- Municipality
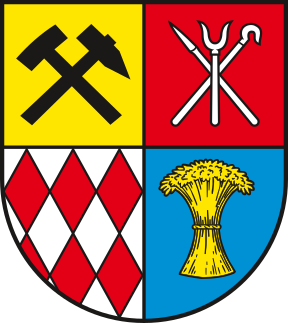
- Coat of arms

- Location of Benndorf within Mansfeld-Südharz district
- Interactive map of Benndorf
- Location within Germany Location within Saxony-Anhalt
- Coordinates: 51°34′N 11°29′E
- Country: Germany
- State: Saxony-Anhalt
- District: Mansfeld-Südharz
- Municipal assoc.: Mansfelder Grund-Helbra

Government
  - Mayor (2022–29): Matthias Jentsch

Area
  - Total: 5.77 km^{2} (2.23 sq mi)
- Elevation: 242 m (794 ft)

Population (2025-12-31)
  - Total: 1,891
  - Density: 328/km^{2} (849/sq mi)
- Time zone: UTC+01:00 (CET)
  - Summer (DST): UTC+02:00 (CEST)
- Postal codes: 06308
- Dialling codes: 034772
- Vehicle registration: MSH, EIL, HET, ML, SGH

Benndorf (German pronunciation: [ˈbɛndɔʁf]) is a municipality in the Mansfeld-Südharz district, Saxony-Anhalt, Germany.
