= Hergisdorf =

- Municipality
- Coat of arms

- Location of Hergisdorf within Mansfeld-Südharz district
- Interactive map of Hergisdorf
- Location within Germany Location within Saxony-Anhalt
- Coordinates: 51°32′N 11°29′E
- Country: Germany
- State: Saxony-Anhalt
- District: Mansfeld-Südharz
- Municipal assoc.: Mansfelder Grund-Helbra

Government
  - Mayor (2022–29): Jürgen Colawo

Area
  - Total: 9.54 km^{2} (3.68 sq mi)
- Elevation: 185 m (607 ft)

Population (2025-12-31)
  - Total: 1,383
  - Density: 145/km^{2} (375/sq mi)
- Time zone: UTC+01:00 (CET)
  - Summer (DST): UTC+02:00 (CEST)
- Postal codes: 06313
- Dialling codes: 034772
- Vehicle registration: MSH
- Website: www.verwaltungsamt-helbra.de

Hergisdorf is a municipality in the Mansfeld-Südharz district, Saxony-Anhalt, Germany.
