= Helbra =

- Municipality
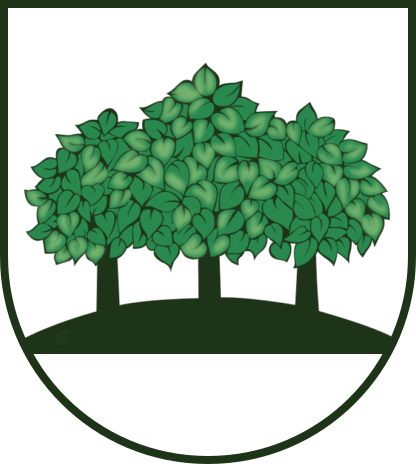
- Coat of arms

- Location of Helbra within Mansfeld-Südharz district
- Interactive map of Helbra
- Location within Germany Location within Saxony-Anhalt
- Coordinates: 51°33′N 11°30′E
- Country: Germany
- State: Saxony-Anhalt
- District: Mansfeld-Südharz
- Municipal assoc.: Mansfelder Grund-Helbra

Government
  - Mayor (2022–29): Gerd Wyszkowski (CDU)

Area
  - Total: 9.26 km^{2} (3.58 sq mi)
- Elevation: 221 m (725 ft)

Population (2025-12-31)
  - Total: 3,641
  - Density: 393/km^{2} (1,020/sq mi)
- Time zone: UTC+01:00 (CET)
  - Summer (DST): UTC+02:00 (CEST)
- Postal codes: 06311
- Dialling codes: 034772
- Vehicle registration: MSH
- Website: www.gemeinde-helbra.de

Helbra is a municipality in the Mansfeld-Südharz district, Saxony-Anhalt, Germany.

== People ==
- Fritz Schenk (1930-2006), journalist
