= Ritterode =

- Stadtteil of Hettstedt
- Interactive map of Ritterode
- Location within Germany Location within Saxony-Anhalt
- Coordinates: 51°38′N 11°27′E
- Country: Germany
- State: Saxony-Anhalt
- District: Mansfeld-Südharz
- Town: Hettstedt

Area
  - Total: 7.08 km^{2} (2.73 sq mi)
- Elevation: 228 m (748 ft)

Population (2009-12-31)
  - Total: 320
  - Density: 45/km^{2} (120/sq mi)
- Time zone: UTC+01:00 (CET)
  - Summer (DST): UTC+02:00 (CEST)
- Postal codes: 06333
- Dialling codes: 034781
- Vehicle registration: MSH

Ritterode is a village and a former municipality in the Mansfeld-Südharz district, Saxony-Anhalt, Germany. Since 1 September 2010, it is part of the town Hettstedt.
