= André Schröder =

German politician (born 1969)

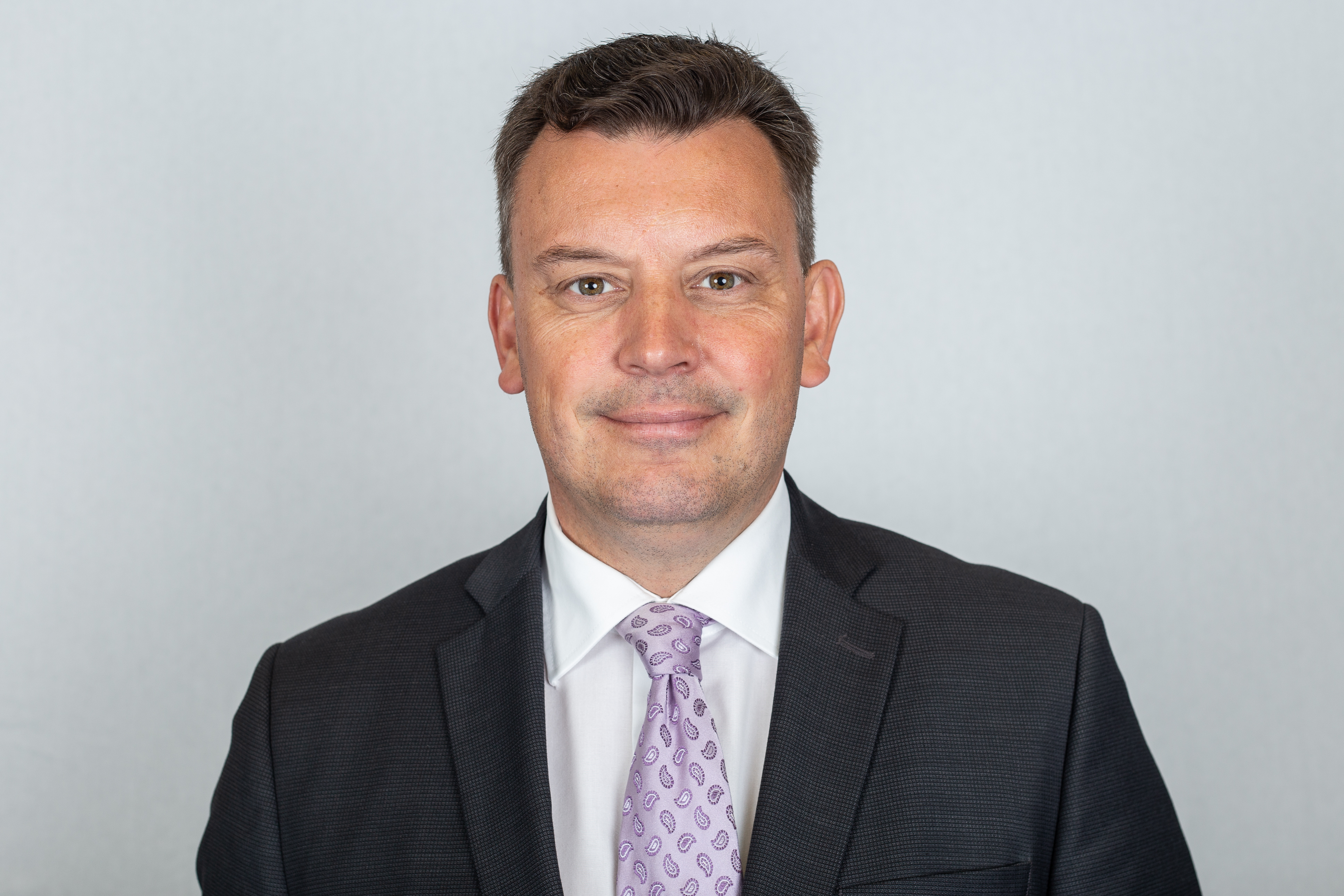
- Schröder in 2018

Landrat of Mansfeld-Südharz
- Incumbent
- Assumed office 21 July 2021
- Preceded by: Angelika Klein

Personal details
- Born: 21 April 1969 (age 56) Sangerhausen
- Party: Christian Democratic Union

André Schröder (born 21 April 1969 in Sangerhausen) is a German politician serving as Landrat of Mansfeld-Südharz since 2021. From 2016 to 2019, he served as minister of finance of Saxony-Anhalt. From 2002 to 2021, he was a member of the Landtag of Saxony-Anhalt.
