= Edersleben =

- Municipality
- Location of Edersleben within Mansfeld-Südharz district
- Interactive map of Edersleben
- Location within Germany Location within Saxony-Anhalt
- Coordinates: 51°25′N 11°16′E
- Country: Germany
- State: Saxony-Anhalt
- District: Mansfeld-Südharz

Government
  - Mayor (2017–24): Claudia Renner

Area
  - Total: 9.05 km^{2} (3.49 sq mi)
- Elevation: 132 m (433 ft)

Population (2025-12-31)
  - Total: 916
  - Density: 101/km^{2} (262/sq mi)
- Time zone: UTC+01:00 (CET)
  - Summer (DST): UTC+02:00 (CEST)
- Postal codes: 06528
- Dialling codes: 03464
- Vehicle registration: MSH, EIL, HET, ML, SGH
- Website: www.vwg-goldene-aue.de

Edersleben is a municipality in the Mansfeld-Südharz district, Saxony-Anhalt, Germany.
