= Brücken-Hackpfüffel =

- Municipality
- Location of Brücken-Hackpfüffel within Mansfeld-Südharz district
- Interactive map of Brücken-Hackpfüffel
- Location within Germany Location within Saxony-Anhalt
- Coordinates: 51°25′50″N 11°11′50″E
- Country: Germany
- State: Saxony-Anhalt
- District: Mansfeld-Südharz

Government
  - Mayor (2021–28): Christoph Vogler

Area
  - Total: 16.65 km^{2} (6.43 sq mi)
- Elevation: 140 m (460 ft)

Population (2025-12-31)
  - Total: 958
  - Density: 57.5/km^{2} (149/sq mi)
- Time zone: UTC+01:00 (CET)
  - Summer (DST): UTC+02:00 (CEST)
- Postal codes: 06528
- Dialling codes: 034656
- Vehicle registration: MSH
- Website: www.vwg-goldene-aue.de

Brücken-Hackpfüffel is a municipality in the Mansfeld-Südharz district, Saxony-Anhalt, Germany. It was formed on 1 January 2009 by the merger of the former municipalities Brücken and Hackpfüffel.

== Geography ==
The municipality lies north-east of the Kyffhäuser mountain in the Goldene Aue. Sangerhausen, the capital of Mansfeld-Südharz county is only 8 kilometers from the village of Brücken. The area of Brücken-Hackpfüffel stretches from the Unstrut tributary Helme in the north to the border with Thüringia in the south.

== Historical population ==
Figures prior to 2009 are a sum of the two separate municipalities of Brücken and Hackpfüffel.

| Year | Inhabitants |
|---|---|
| 2017 | 976 |
| 2010 | 1087 |
| 2009 | 1101 |
| 2008 | 1114 |
| 2007 | 1133 |
| 2006 | 1170 |
| 2005 | 1185 |
| 2004 | 1170 |
| 2003 | 1178 |
| 2002 | 1220 |
| 2001 | 1244 |
| 2000 | 1255 |
| 1995 | 1225 |
| 1990 | 1282 |
| 1989 | 1304 |
| 1985 | 1336 |
| 1981* | 1391 |
| 1971* | 1615 |
| 1964* | 1695 |

- Census

Data as of 31 December, except for census years.
