= Klostermansfeld =

- Municipality
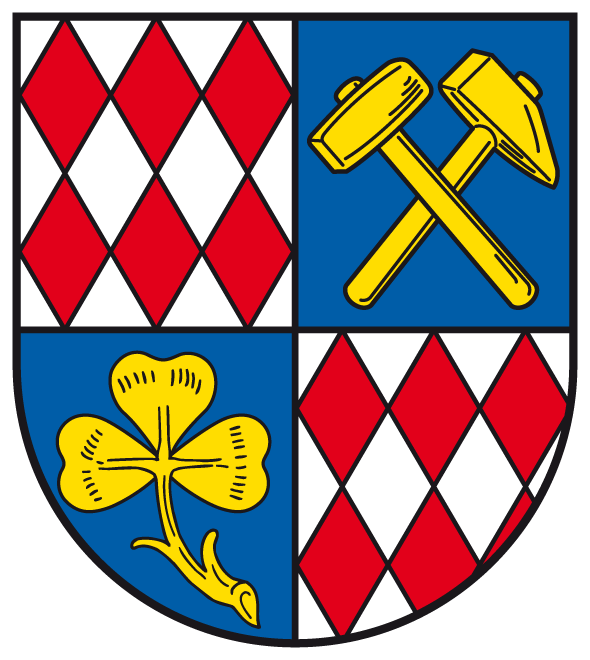
- Coat of arms

- Location of Klostermansfeld within Mansfeld-Südharz district
- Interactive map of Klostermansfeld
- Location within Germany Location within Saxony-Anhalt
- Coordinates: 51°35′N 11°30′E
- Country: Germany
- State: Saxony-Anhalt
- District: Mansfeld-Südharz
- Municipal assoc.: Mansfelder Grund-Helbra

Government
  - Mayor (2020–27): Frank Ochsner

Area
  - Total: 8.80 km^{2} (3.40 sq mi)
- Elevation: 249 m (817 ft)

Population (2025-12-31)
  - Total: 2,042
  - Density: 232/km^{2} (601/sq mi)
- Time zone: UTC+01:00 (CET)
  - Summer (DST): UTC+02:00 (CEST)
- Postal codes: 06308
- Dialling codes: 034772
- Vehicle registration: MSH

Klostermansfeld is a municipality in the Mansfeld-Südharz district, Saxony-Anhalt, Germany.
