= Johann Heinrich Gottlob Justi =

German political economist (1717–1771)

Johann Heinrich Gottlob von Justi (28 December 1717 – 21 July 1771) was one of the leading German political economists and a cameralists in the 18th century.

== Life ==
Justi was born in Brücken. From 1750 to 1753, Justi taught at the Theresianum Knights Academy in Vienna, Austria, where he established close contacts with Friedrich Wilhelm von Haugwitz whose administrative reforms exerted a strong influence on his political ideas. After briefly settling in Erfurt and Leipzig, Justi was appointed Director of Police in Göttingen in 1755. In Göttingen Justi started his systematic study of contemporary French works, in particular Montesquieu's Spirit of the Laws. In 1757, he accepted an invitation of the Danish minister Bernstorff to Copenhagen. In 1758, he settled in Altona. Hoping for a permanent position in Prussia, Justi moved to Berlin in 1760. Five years later, in 1765, he was appointed Prussian Inspector of Mines, Glass, and Steel Works. In 1768, he was accused of misappropriating government funds and imprisoned in Küstrin. New archival research by Andre Wakefield has revealed in how far Justi's activities as Prussian official in the Neumark can be considered 'a disaster in almost every way'. After being released in April 1771 he moved back to Berlin where he died soon after.

== Oeuvre ==
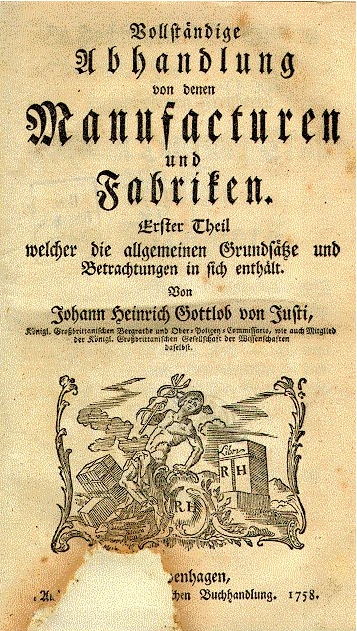
Abhandlung von denen Manufakturen und Fabriken (1758)

Justi's oeuvre consists of more than 50 independent works dealing with philosophical, literary, technological, geological, chemical, physical as well as political and economic issues. For most of his life, Justi did not hold a permanent position in academia or public administration but had to live from the royalties of his writings. Accordingly, he tried to present at least two new titles at each of the two large annual German book fairs in Leipzig and Frankfurt. This circumstance accounts for the manifold textual similarities that can be found within Justi's works.

Writing against the background of the European power struggle during the Seven Years' War, Justi's central aim was to create modern commercial monarchies in the larger states of the Holy Roman Empire that could equal the military strength, political standing and economic performance of England and France. In so doing, Justi took recourse to ideas of French thinkers such as Fénelon, Saint-Pierre, d'Argenson and Montesquieu.

In his political writings, Justi stressed that a country could only be economically and commercially successful if it was run by a moderate government that recognised the inviolability of private property. By contrast, despotism necessarily led to the impoverishment and military weakening of a country. Under the influence of Montesquieu Justi extensively discussed the advantages and disadvantages of different forms of government, yet concluded that the only form of government that would be able to coordinate and implement wide-ranging economic reforms was a modernised monarchical regime.

Justi came up with a broad range of ideas for economic reform. Apart from measures supporting population growth and fostering competition (by reducing the power of guilds and corporations), Justi viewed the increase in private consumption (by abolishing sumptuary laws), the spread of manufactures and companies as well as the growth in external trade (with the help of government-sponsored trade companies and the abolition of prohibitions regarding the import and export of goods) as cornerstones for economic success. These measures had to be accompanied by improvements in mining and agriculture.

Ultimately, these reforms could only be successful if they were supported by a comprehensive tax reform that would lead, among other things, to the abolition of the excise tax (Akzise). In his financial writings, the influence of contemporary French writings as well as cameralistic theories developed by Wolff and Pufendorf shines through.

On various issues, Justi seems to take positions that resemble the views of Adam Smith. However, his overall argument – the need for short-term government interventions in order to obtain a liberal economic order in the long term – is far closer to thinkers such as Sir James Steuart (economist).

Research on Justi has primarily focused on his works on political economy (see overview studies by Ferdinand Frensdorff and Ulrich Adam). Other parts of his comprehensive oeuvre have not yet been studied in detail.

== Secondary literature ==
- Ulrich Adam: The Political Economy of J.H.G. Justi. Peter Lang, Oxford 2006, ISBN 3-03910-278-8
- Ferdinand Frensdorff: Über das Leben und die Schriften des Nationalökonomen J.H.G. von Justi. Göttingen 1903
- Dirk Fleischer: "Kirchenverständnis aus polizeiwissenschaftlicher Sicht. Johann Heinrich Gottlob von Justis Verständnis der Kirche", in Albrecht Beutel et al.(ed.): Christentum im Übergang. Neue Studien zu Kirche und Religion in der Aufklärungszeit. Leipzig 2006, pp. 71–83, ISBN 3-374-02396-7
- Andre Wakefield: The Disordered Police State. German Cameralism as Science and Practice. University of Chicago Press, Chicago, 2009. ISBN 978-0-226-87020-5

== Selected writings ==
- Staatswirtschaft oder systematische Abhandlung aller ökonomischen und Cameralwissenschaft, 2 volumes, I+II (1755)
- Entdeckte Ursachen des verderbten Münzwesens in Teutschland; Leipzig 1755 Breitkopf
- Grundsätze der Polizeywissenschaft (1756)]
- Die Chimäre des Gleichgewichts von Europa (1758)
- Vollständige Abhandlung von denen Manufakturen und Fabriken, 2 Bände, I (1758), II (1761)
- Staatswirthschaft, oder systematische Abhandlung aller Oekonomischen und Cameral-Wissenschaften, die zur Regierung eines Landes erfodert werden. In zweien Theilen sgefertigt. Erster Theil, Welcher die Lehre -von Erhaltung und Vermehrung des Vermogens des Staats, und mithin die Staatskunst, die Policey- und Commereien-Wissenschaft nebst der Haushaltungskunst in sich begreifft. Zweyte stark vermehrte Auflage (1758)
- Die Chimäre des Gleichgewichts der Handlung und Schiffahrt (1759)
- Der Grundriss einer guten Regierung (1759)
- Psammitichus, 2 volumes, I (1759), II (1760)
- Natur und Wesen der Staaten (1760)
- Leben und Charakter des Königl. Polnischen und Churfürstl. Sächsischen Premier-Ministre Grafens von Brühl, 3 volumes, I (1760), II (1761), III (1764)
- Die Grundsätze zur Macht und Glückseligkeit der Staaten, 2 volumes, I (1760), II (1761)
- Gesammelte politische und Finanzschriften 3 volumes, I+II (1761), III (1764)
- Vergleichungen der europäischen mit den asiatischen und andern vermeintlich barbarischen Regierungen (1762)
- Ausführliche Abhandlung von denen Steuern und Abgaben (1762)
- Die Kunst das Silber zu affiniren oder das mit andern Metallen vermischte Silber wider fein zu machen (1765) Digitalisierte Ausgabe
- System des Finanzwesens (1766)
