= Kelbra =

- Town
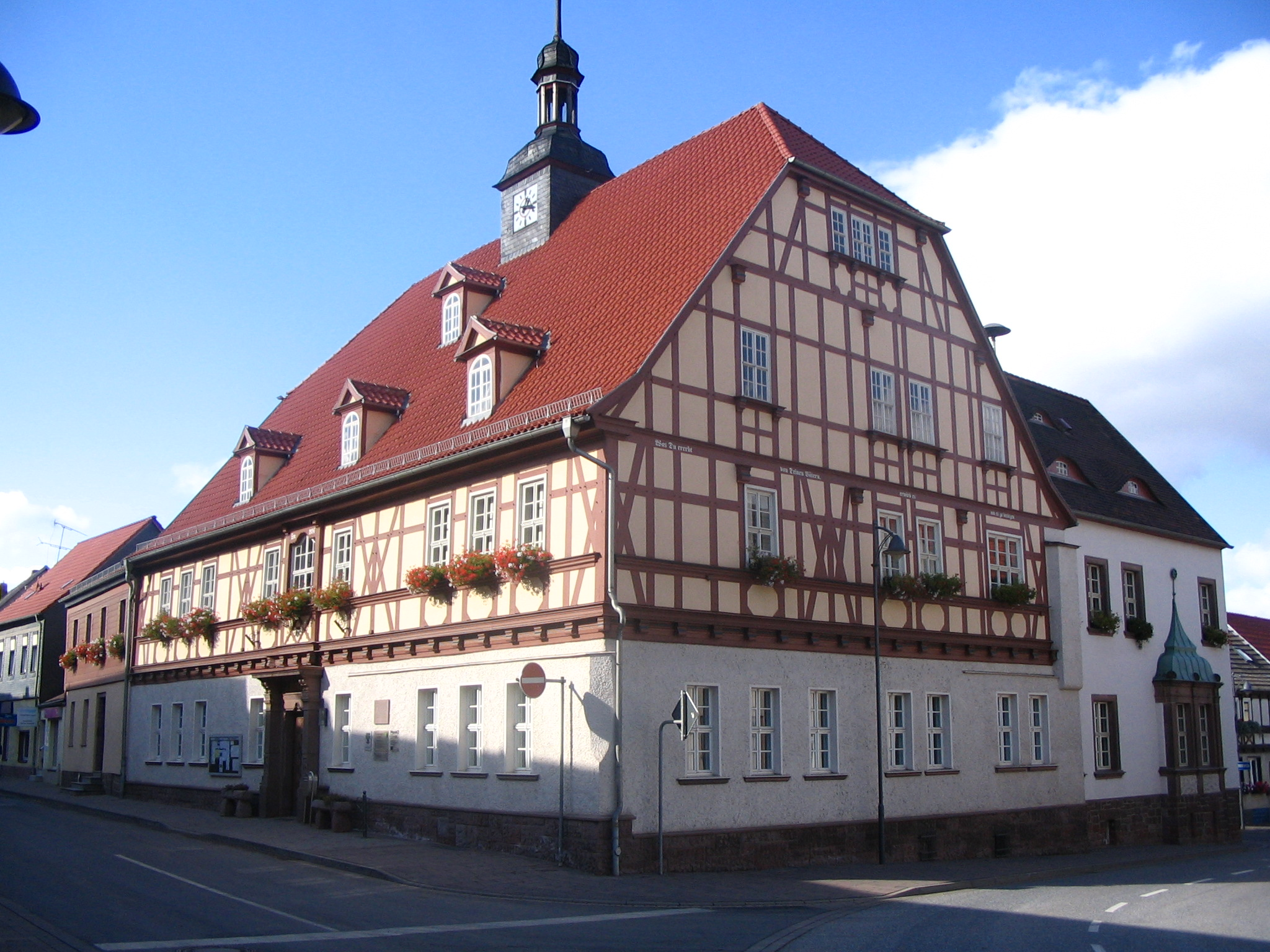
- Town hall

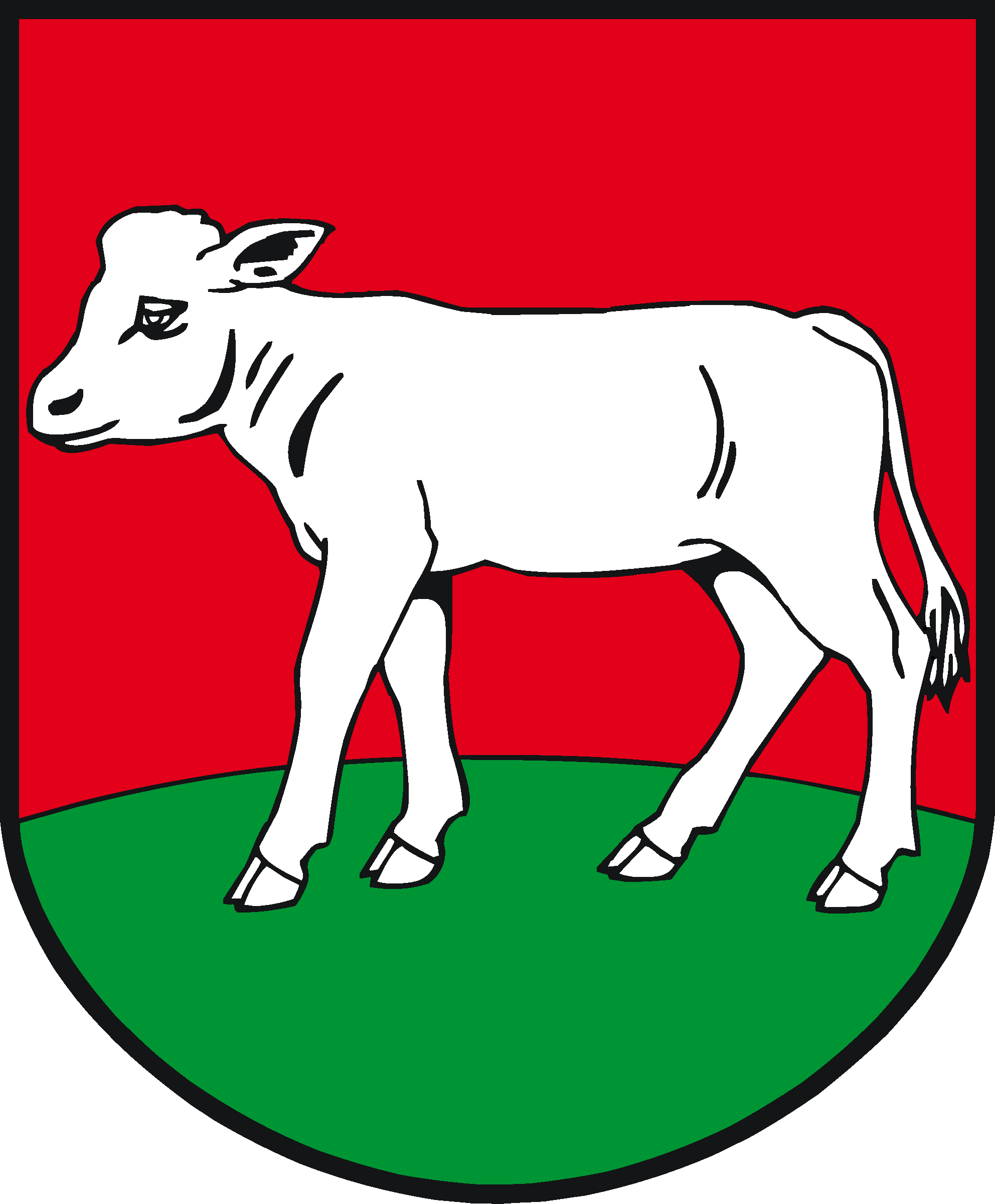
- Coat of arms

- Location of Kelbra within Mansfeld-Südharz district
- Interactive map of Kelbra
- Location within Germany Location within Saxony-Anhalt
- Coordinates: 51°26′N 11°2′E
- Country: Germany
- State: Saxony-Anhalt
- District: Mansfeld-Südharz

Government
  - Mayor (2017–24): Lothar Bornkessel

Area
  - Total: 40.55 km^{2} (15.66 sq mi)
- Elevation: 157 m (515 ft)

Population (2025-12-31)
  - Total: 3,160
  - Density: 77.9/km^{2} (202/sq mi)
- Time zone: UTC+01:00 (CET)
  - Summer (DST): UTC+02:00 (CEST)
- Postal codes: 06537
- Dialling codes: 034651
- Vehicle registration: MSH, SGH
- Website: www.kelbra.de

Kelbra (German: [ˈkɛlbʁa]) is a town the Mansfeld-Südharz district, in Saxony-Anhalt, in central Germany. It is situated north of the Kyffhäuser mountains, approx. 20 km (12 mi) west of Sangerhausen, and 20 km (12 mi) east of Nordhausen. Kelbra is part of the Verbandsgemeinde Goldene Aue.

Kelbra lies on the northern slopes of the Kyffhäuser mountains in the Goldene Aue. The B 85 federal road starts in the neighbouring village of Berga and runs through Kelbra over the Kyffhäuser to Passau.

Due to the proximity of the Kelbra Dam and the Kyffhäuser, the town is a type of tourist centre, but suffers from heavy day traffic, especially motorcycles, because the road climbing up to the Kyffhäuser starts here.

Nearby are the Barbarossa Cave and the Peasants' War Panorama in Bad Frankenhausen.

The villages of Sittendorf, Tilleda (Kyffhäuser) and Thürungen belong to the municipality of Kelbra.

Berga-Kelbra station, which is on the Halle–Hann. Münden railway is located nearby in Berga.

== History ==
During World War II, Kelbra was the location of a subcamp of the Mittelbau-Dora concentration camp, whose prisoners included Poles and Soviets. In April 1945, four prisoners escaped, whereas the remaining prisoners were sent on a death march, and the survivors were liberated by American troops at the Wöbbelin concentration camp on 2 May 1945.

== Town twinning ==
Kelbra is twinned with the English village of Frampton Cotterell and the German town of Bad Salzdetfurth.

== Notable people ==
- Paul Carell (1911–1997), SS-officer, journalist
