= Mansfeld =

Town in Saxony-Anhalt, Germany

- Town
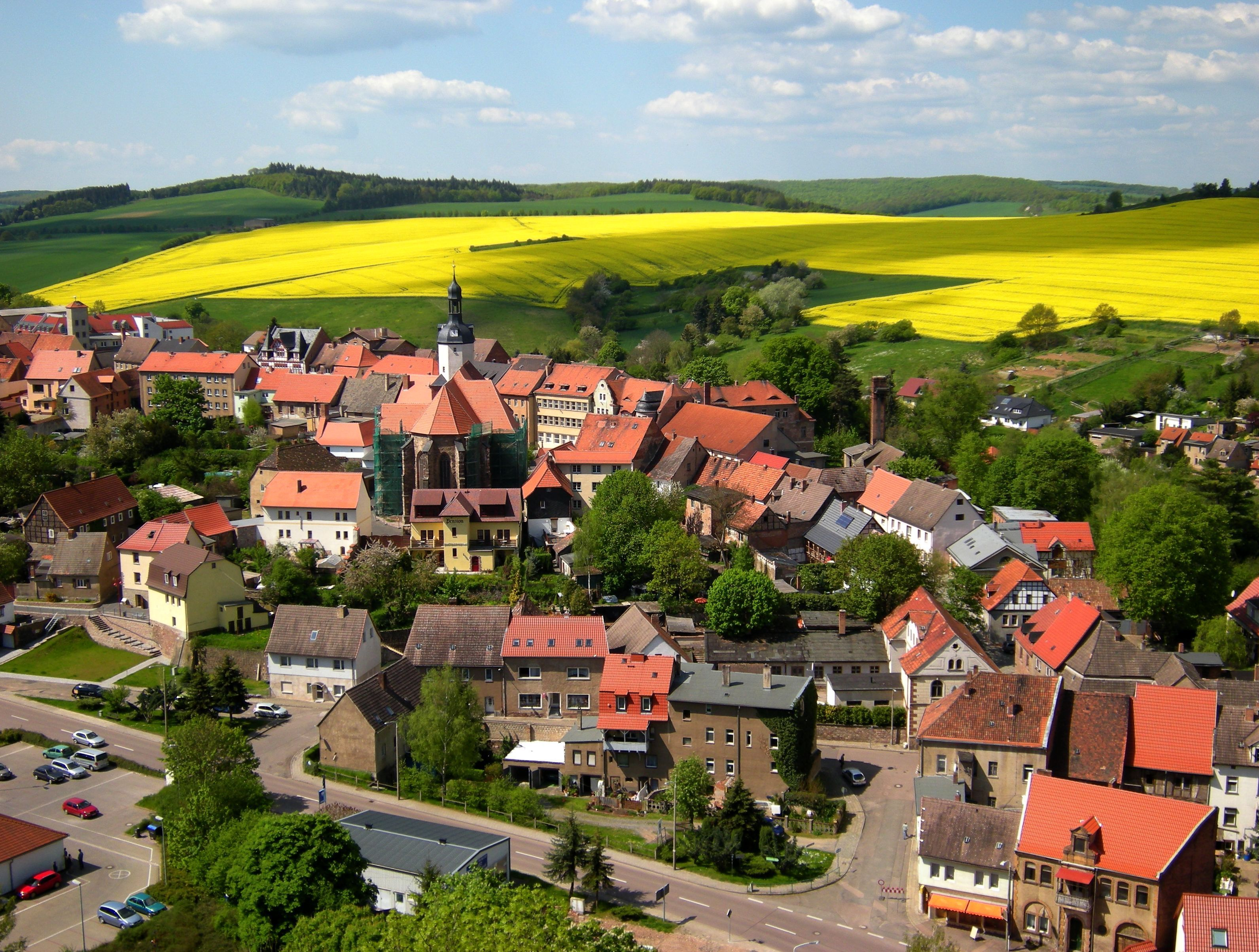
- Old town, view from the castle

- Coat of arms

- Location of Mansfeld within Mansfeld-Südharz district
- Interactive map of Mansfeld
- Location within Germany Location within Saxony-Anhalt
- Coordinates: 51°35′39″N 11°27′17″E
- Country: Germany
- State: Saxony-Anhalt
- District: Mansfeld-Südharz

Government
  - Mayor (2018–25): Andreas Koch (PdF–FBM)

Area
  - Total: 143.8 km^{2} (55.5 sq mi)
- Elevation: 255 m (837 ft)

Population (2025-12-31)
  - Total: 7,946
  - Density: 55.26/km^{2} (143.1/sq mi)
- Time zone: UTC+01:00 (CET)
  - Summer (DST): UTC+02:00 (CEST)
- Postal codes: 06343
- Dialling codes: 034782
- Vehicle registration: MSH
- Website: www.mansfeld.eu

Mansfeld (German pronunciation: [ˈmansˌfɛlt]), sometimes also unofficially Mansfeld-Lutherstadt, is a town in the district of Mansfeld-Südharz, in Saxony-Anhalt, Germany.

Protestant reformer Martin Luther grew up in Mansfeld, and in 1993 the town became one of sixteen places in Germany to be designated a Lutherstadt for this reason.

== Geography ==
It is situated east of the Harz mountain range on the river Wipper, a left tributary of the Saale, about 35 km (22 mi) northwest of Halle. Together with neighbouring Eisleben, it is part of the historic Mansfeld Land region, roughly corresponding to the former district of Mansfelder Land which in 2007 merged into present Mansfeld-Südharz district.

Mansfeld station is a stop on the Mansfeldbahn railway line (Wipperliese), a branch of the Berlin-Blankenheim railway, running from Klostermansfeld to Wippra.

=== Town districts ===
The township currently comprises 15 districts (Ortschaften):

- Abberode
- Annarode
- Biesenrode
- Braunschwende
- Friesdorf
- Gorenzen
- Großörner
- Hermerode
- Mansfeld proper
- Möllendorf
- Molmerswende
- Piskaborn
- Ritzgerode
- Siebigerode
- Vatterode

The former municipalities Annarode, Biesenrode, Gorenzen, Großörner, Möllendorf, Piskaborn, Siebigerode and Vatterode were merged into Mansfeld in 2005, Abberode, Braunschwende, Friesdorf, Hermerode, Molmerswende and Ritzgerode in 2009.

== History ==
The House of Mansfeld, whose members belonged to the Saxon nobility and served as counts in the Hassegau, was first documented in a 973 deed. The counts built Mansfeld Castle, whose foundations date back to the late 11th century, when one Hoyer of Mansfeld served as field marshal to Emperor Henry V. The first reference of the fortress coincides with the extinction of the elder line in 1229. The estates were inherited by the Lords of Querfurt, who also adopted the comital title, calling themselves Counts of Mansfeld from that time on.

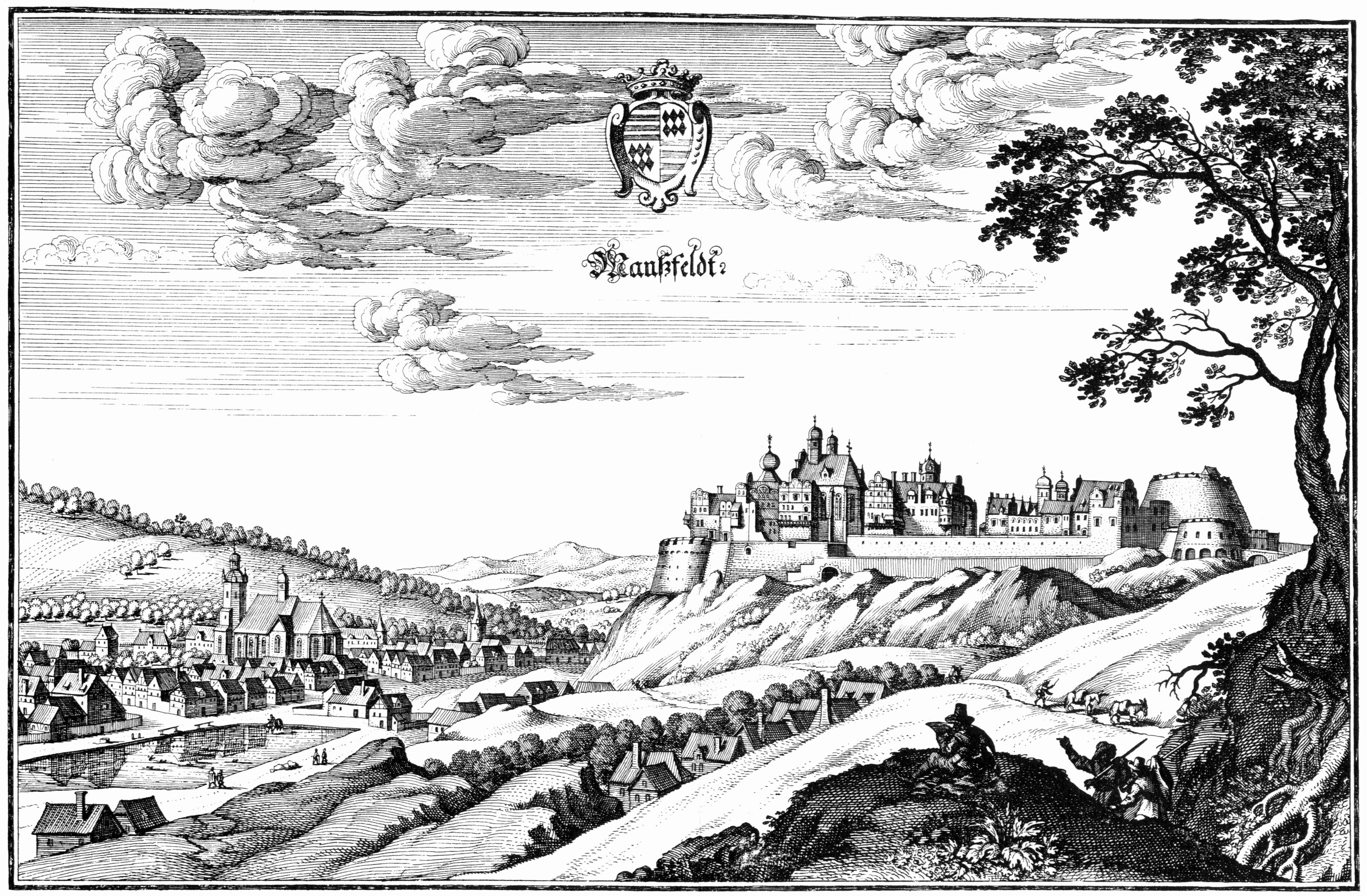
Mansfeld town and castle, 1650 engraving by Matthäus Merian

The settlement of Mansfeld received town privileges in 1400, and grew through the development of copper and silver mining, an activity in which Hans Luder from Möhra, father to Martin Luther and Mansfeld citizen from 1484, was employed as a master smelter. Luther's family had arrived into a modest prosperity, he himself attended the local school between 1488 and 1496. The building known as "Luther's School" had to be torn down and rebuilt in 2000 due to structural problems. His parents' house is preserved and today a museum. Luther also acted as an altar server at the St George parish church.

The Counts of Mansfeld had already lost Imperial immediacy in 1580. When the comital line finally became extinct in 1780, the estates around Mansfeld were incorporated into the Prussian Duchy of Magdeburg. The town retained the status of an independent city (Immediatstadt), it was temporarily part of the Napoleonic Kingdom of Westphalia and after the 1815 Congress of Vienna belonged to the Prussian Province of Saxony.

== Politics ==
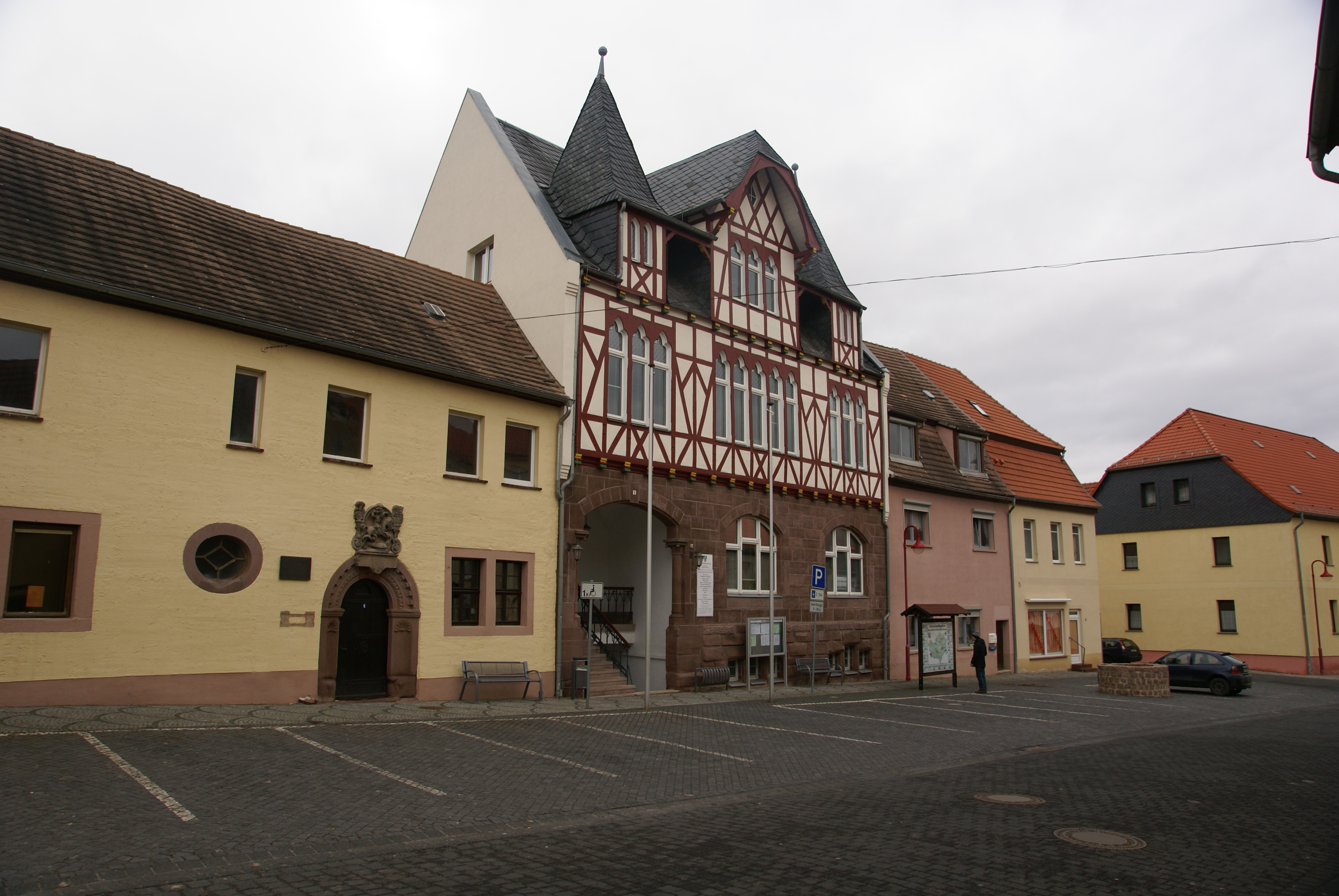
Town hall

Seats in the town's assembly (Stadtrat) as of 2014 local elections:

- Christian Democratic Union of Germany (CDU): 5
- Social Democratic Party of Germany (SPD): 4
- The Left: 2
- Free Voters: 8
- Independent: 1

== Notable people ==
- Martin Luther Religious revolutionary, leader of Protestant revolution, philosopher
- Johann Wigand (c. 1523–1587), Lutheran cleric
- Johann Karl Ehrenfried Kegel (1784–1863), agronomist and explorer of the Kamchatka Peninsula
- Franz Wilhelm Junghuhn (1809–1864), botanist and geologist
- Arthur Gaebelein (1891–1964), footballer
- Wolfgang Zeller (1893–1967), composer
