= Walbeck, Mansfeld-Südharz =

Walbeck
- Stadtteil of Hettstedt
- Interactive map of Walbeck
- Location within Germany Location within Saxony-Anhalt
- Coordinates: 51°40′N 11°28′E
- Country: Germany
- State: Saxony-Anhalt
- District: Mansfeld-Südharz
- Town: Hettstedt

Area
  - Total: 9.66 km^{2} (3.73 sq mi)
- Elevation: 214 m (702 ft)

Population (2009-12-31)
  - Total: 882
  - Density: 91.3/km^{2} (236/sq mi)
- Time zone: UTC+01:00 (CET)
  - Summer (DST): UTC+02:00 (CEST)
- Postal codes: 06333
- Dialling codes: 03476
- Vehicle registration: MSH

Walbeck (German pronunciation: [ˈvalbɛk]) is a village and a former municipality in the Mansfeld-Südharz district, Saxony-Anhalt, Germany. Since 1 September 2010, it is part of the town Hettstedt.
