= Wimmelburg =

- Municipality
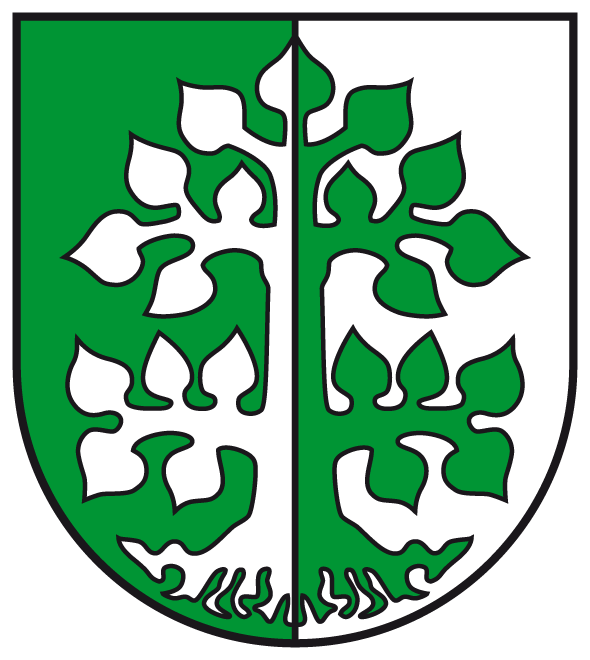
- Coat of arms

- Location of Wimmelburg within Mansfeld-Südharz district
- Interactive map of Wimmelburg
- Location within Germany Location within Saxony-Anhalt
- Coordinates: 51°31′N 11°31′E
- Country: Germany
- State: Saxony-Anhalt
- District: Mansfeld-Südharz
- Municipal assoc.: Mansfelder Grund-Helbra

Government
  - Mayor (2021–28): Andreas Zinke (Ind.)

Area
  - Total: 8.56 km^{2} (3.31 sq mi)
- Elevation: 170 m (560 ft)

Population (2025-12-31)
  - Total: 1,093
  - Density: 128/km^{2} (331/sq mi)
- Time zone: UTC+01:00 (CET)
  - Summer (DST): UTC+02:00 (CEST)
- Postal codes: 06313
- Dialling codes: 03475
- Vehicle registration: MSH, EIL, HET, ML, SGH

Wimmelburg is a municipality in the Mansfeld-Südharz district, Saxony-Anhalt, Germany.
