= Hettstedt =

- Town
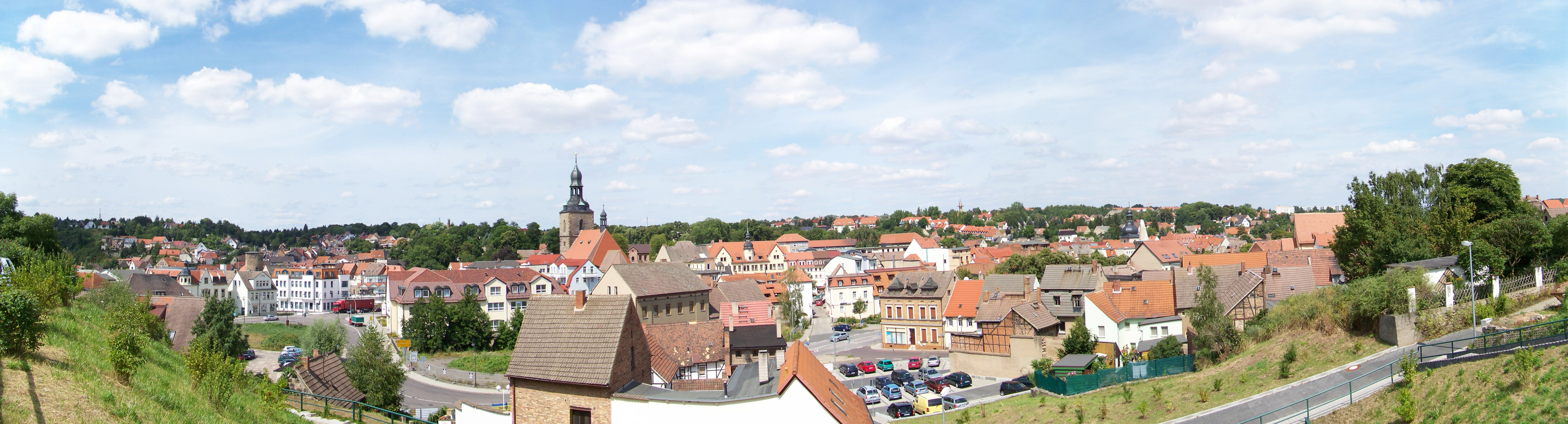

- Coat of arms

- Location of Hettstedt within Mansfeld-Südharz district
- Interactive map of Hettstedt
- Location within Germany Location within Saxony-Anhalt
- Coordinates: 51°38′N 11°30′E
- Country: Germany
- State: Saxony-Anhalt
- District: Mansfeld-Südharz

Government
  - Mayor (2018–25): Dirk Fuhlert (PdF–FBM)

Area
  - Total: 36.93 km^{2} (14.26 sq mi)
- Elevation: 200 m (660 ft)

Population (2025-12-31)
  - Total: 12,626
  - Density: 341.9/km^{2} (885.5/sq mi)
- Time zone: UTC+01:00 (CET)
  - Summer (DST): UTC+02:00 (CEST)
- Postal codes: 06333
- Dialling codes: 03476
- Vehicle registration: MSH, EIL, HET, ML, SGH
- Website: www.hettstedt.de

Hettstedt (German pronunciation: [ˈhɛtˌʃtɛt]) is a town in Mansfeld-Südharz district, Saxony-Anhalt, Germany, on the Wipper. It consists of Hettstedt proper and the Ortschaften (municipal divisions) Ritterode and Walbeck. The former municipalities Ritterode and Walbeck were absorbed into Hettstedt in September 2010.

== History ==
As of 1911, Hettstedt engaged in the manufacture of machinery, pianofortes, and artificial manure, and the surrounding district and villages were occupied with smelting due to the nearby mines of argentiferous copper. Other products included silver, sulphuric acid, and small quantities of nickel and gold.

In the Kaiser Friedrich mine close by, the first steam engine in Germany was erected on 23 August 1785. Hettstedt is mentioned as early as 1046; in 1220 it possessed a castle; in 1380 it received civic privileges. When the county of Mansfeld was sequestrated, Hettstedt came into the possession of Saxony, passing to Prussia in 1815.

== Notable people ==
Politician Roland Claus, member of the Bundestag, is from Hettstedt.

== International relations ==
Hettstedt is twinned with:

- Vöhringen, Germany
- Bergkamen, Germany
