= Berga, Saxony-Anhalt =

Berga
- Municipality
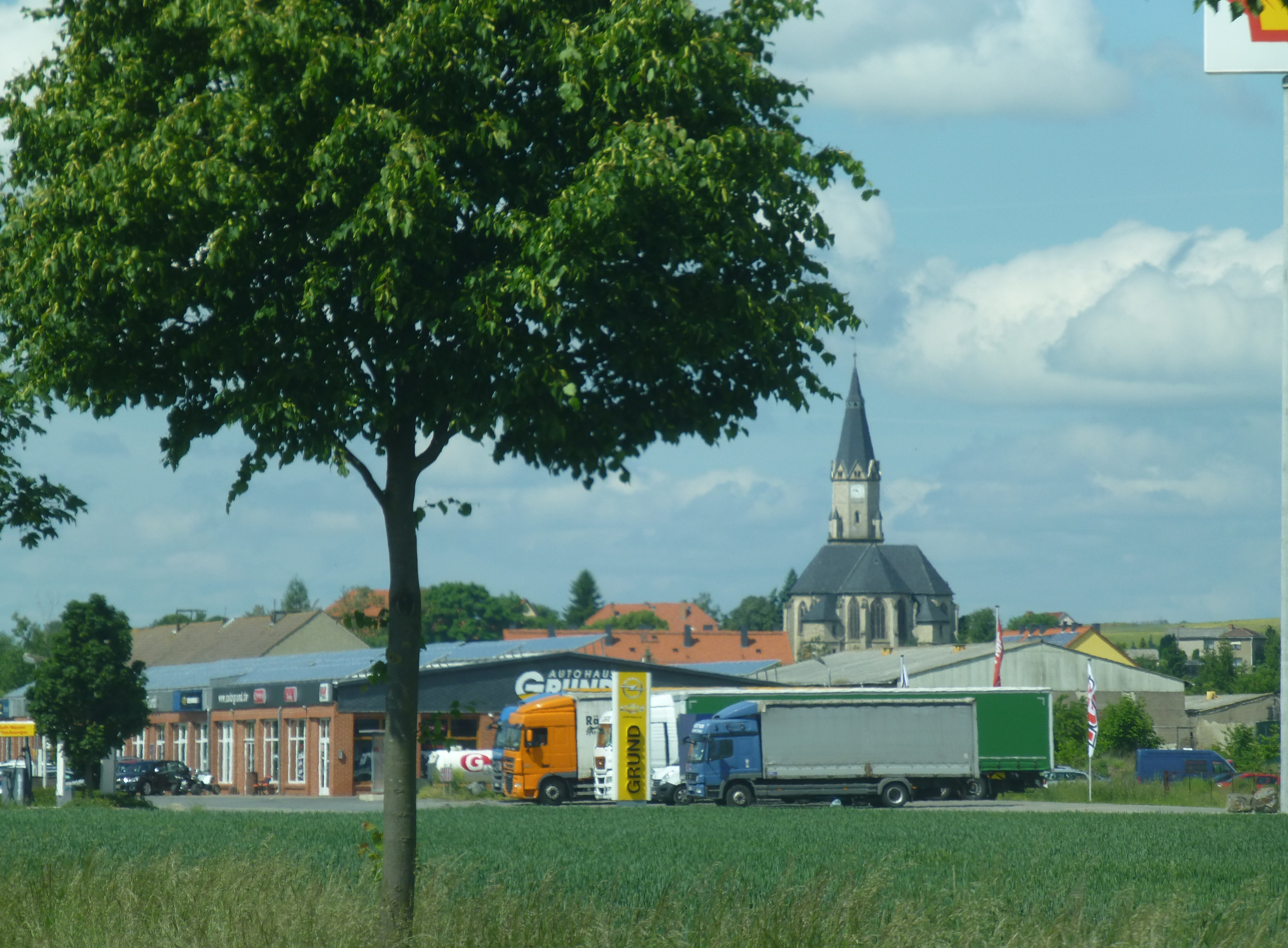
- Lutheran Saints Peter and Paul Church

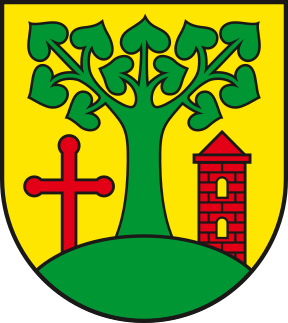
- Coat of arms

- Location of Berga within Mansfeld-Südharz district
- Interactive map of Berga
- Location within Germany Location within Saxony-Anhalt
- Coordinates: 51°27′24″N 11°0′28″E
- Country: Germany
- State: Saxony-Anhalt
- District: Mansfeld-Südharz
- Subdivisions: 3

Government
  - Mayor (2022–29): Gunter Pabst

Area
  - Total: 25.67 km^{2} (9.91 sq mi)
- Elevation: 159 m (522 ft)

Population (2025-12-31)
  - Total: 1,641
  - Density: 63.93/km^{2} (165.6/sq mi)
- Time zone: UTC+01:00 (CET)
  - Summer (DST): UTC+02:00 (CEST)
- Postal codes: 06536
- Dialling codes: 034651
- Vehicle registration: MSH

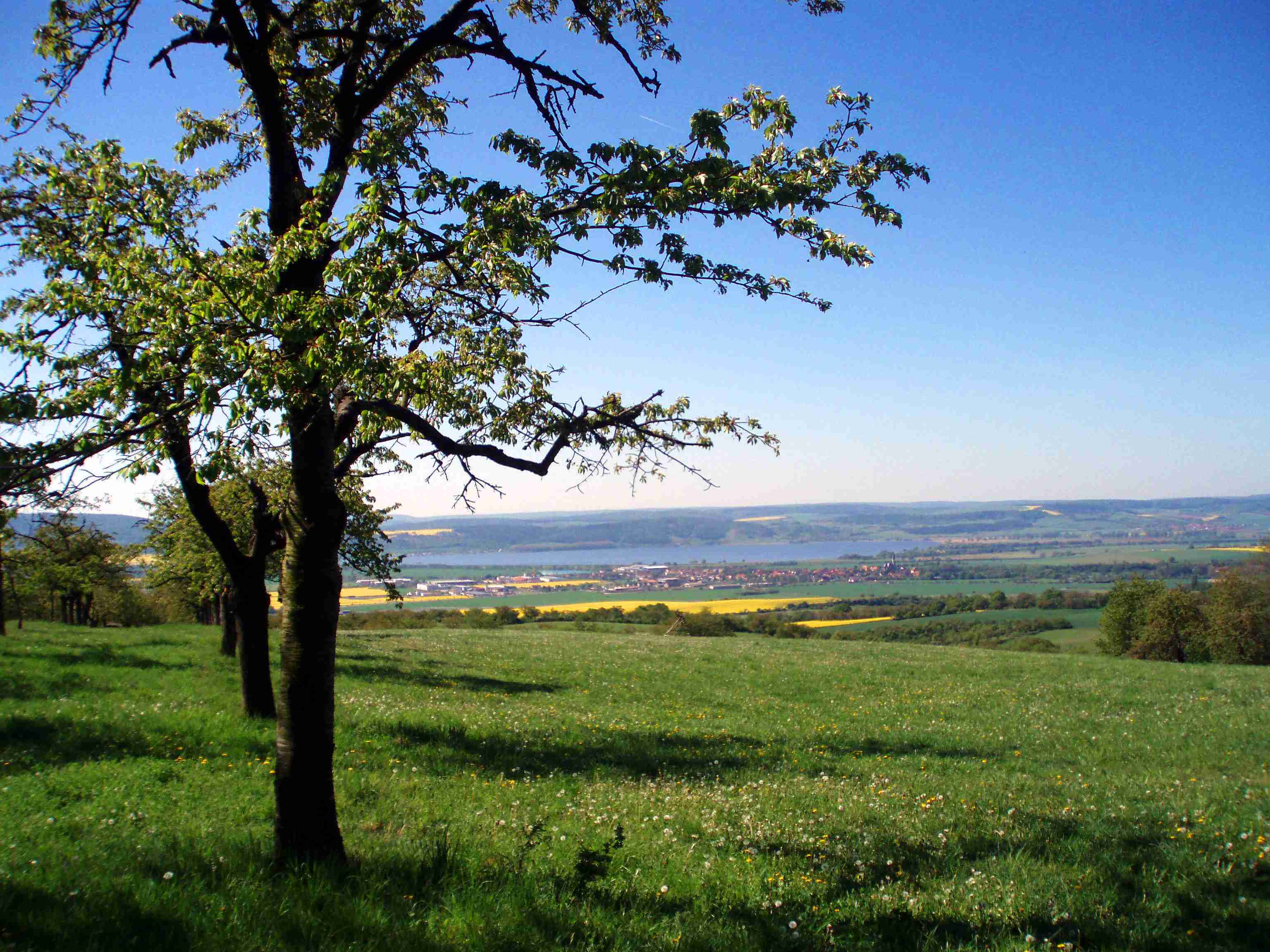
View of Berga and the Kelbra reservoir

Berga (German pronunciation: [ˈbɛʁɡa]) is a municipality in the Mansfeld-Südharz district, Saxony-Anhalt, Germany.

The municipality consists of three villages:

- Berga
- Bösenrode
- Rosperwenda

Berga-Kelbra station, which is on the Halle–Hann. Münden railway is located in Berga.
