= Mansfeld-Südharz =

Coordinates: 51°32′N 11°22′E

- District
- Flag Coat of arms
- Country: Germany
- State: Saxony-Anhalt
- Capital: Sangerhausen

Government
  - District admin.: André Schröder (CDU)

Area
  - Total: 1,449.1 km^{2} (559.5 sq mi)

Population (31 December 2024)
  - Total: 129,029
  - Density: 89.041/km^{2} (230.61/sq mi)
- Time zone: UTC+01:00 (CET)
  - Summer (DST): UTC+02:00 (CEST)
- Vehicle registration: MSH, EIL, HET, ML, SGH
- Website: mansfeldsuedharz.de

Mansfeld-Südharz is a district in Saxony-Anhalt, Germany. Its area is 1,449.1 km^{2} (559.5 sq mi).

== History ==
The district was established by merging the former districts of Sangerhausen and Mansfelder Land as part of the reform of 2007. In the German parliament, the Bundestag, the area forms part of the Mansfeld electoral district.

== Towns and municipalities ==
Clickable map of towns and municipalities in the district

The district Mansfeld-Südharz consists of the following subdivisions:

Free towns
1. Allstedt
2. Arnstein
3. Eisleben
4. Gerbstedt
5. Hettstedt
6. Mansfeld
7. Sangerhausen
Free municipalities
1. Seegebiet Mansfelder Land
2. Südharz

Verbandsgemeinden
1. Goldene Aue; 1. Berga; 2. Brücken-Hackpfüffel; 3. Edersleben; 4. Kelbra^{1, 2}; 5. Wallhausen	2. Mansfelder Grund-Helbra; 1. Ahlsdorf; 2. Benndorf; 3. Blankenheim; 4. Bornstedt; 5. Helbra^{1}; 6. Hergisdorf; 7. Klostermansfeld; 8. Wimmelburg
^{1}seat of the Verbandsgemeinde; ^{2}town;
