= Gerbstedt (Verwaltungsgemeinschaft) =

Coordinates: 51.633°N 11.617°E

Gerbstedt was a Verwaltungsgemeinschaft ("collective municipality") in the Mansfeld-Südharz district, in Saxony-Anhalt, Germany. The seat of the Verwaltungsgemeinschaft was in Gerbstedt. It was disbanded on 1 January 2010.

The Verwaltungsgemeinschaft Gerbstedt consisted of the following municipalities:

1. Augsdorf
2. Freist
3. Friedeburg
4. Friedeburgerhütte
5. Gerbstedt
6. Heiligenthal
7. Hübitz
8. Ihlewitz
9. Rottelsdorf
10. Siersleben
11. Welfesholz
12. Zabenstedt
