= Rote Welle (abandoned village) =

Coordinates: 51°39′31″N 11°33′45″E

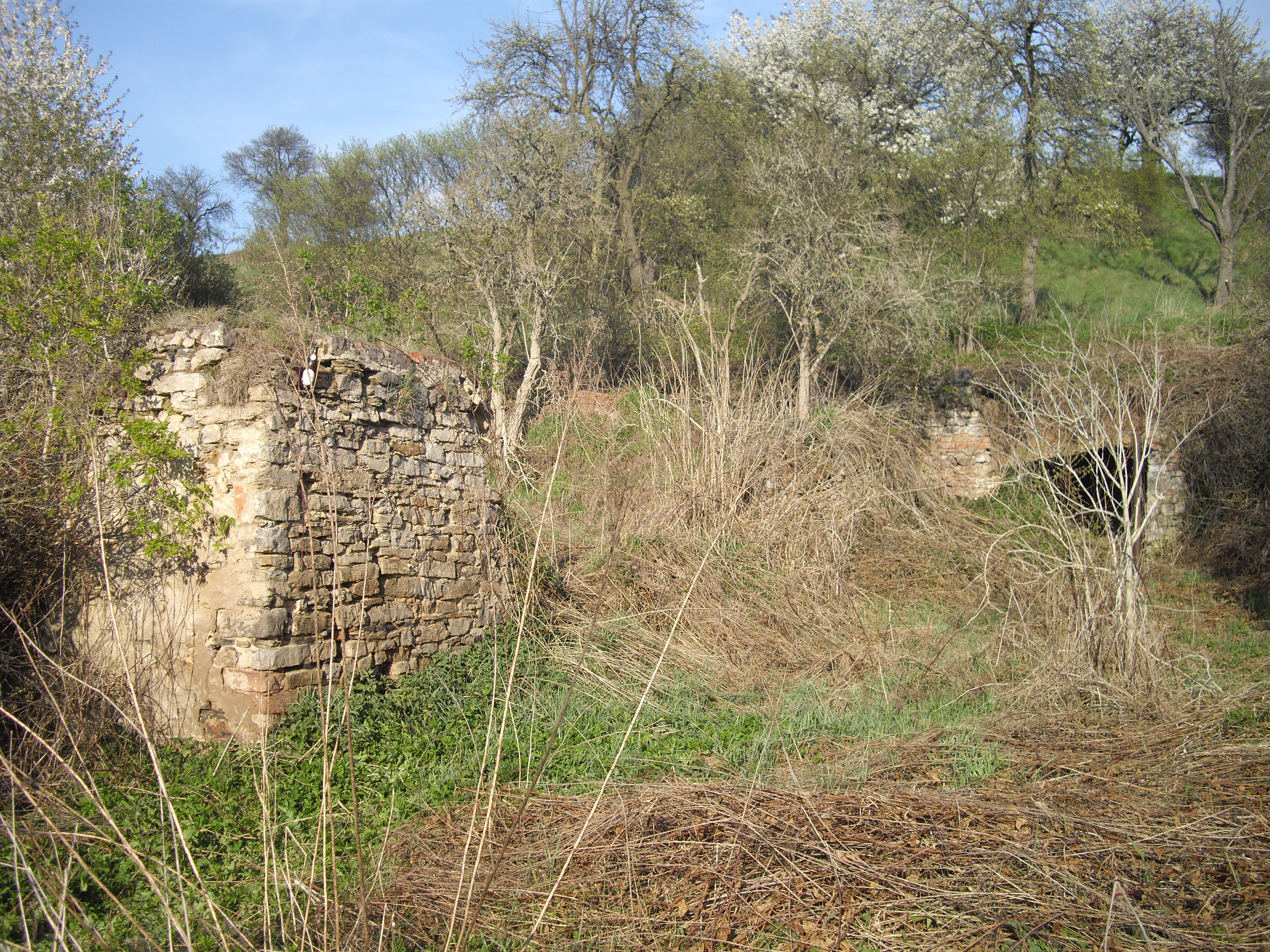
ruin in Rote Welle

Rote Welle (in English Red Wave) is an abandoned village in Saxony-Anhalt, Germany. Today, there can be found ruins, some of them are from a time when the village did not exist any more.

The place is located in the valley of the same named stream Rote Welle, circa 2.3 kilometres (1.4 mi) north of the village Welfesholz.

After the Battle of Welfesholz in 1115, Rote Welle got plundered and burned down together with the villages Lodderstedt, Nisselsdorf, Milrode, Wesenstedt and Disdorf.
