= Rote Welle =

Rote Welle may refer to:

- Rote Welle (Wipper), a river of Saxony-Anhalt, Germany, a tributary of the Wipper
- Rote Welle (abandoned village), in Saxony-Anhalt, Germany
