= Fleischbach =

River in Germany

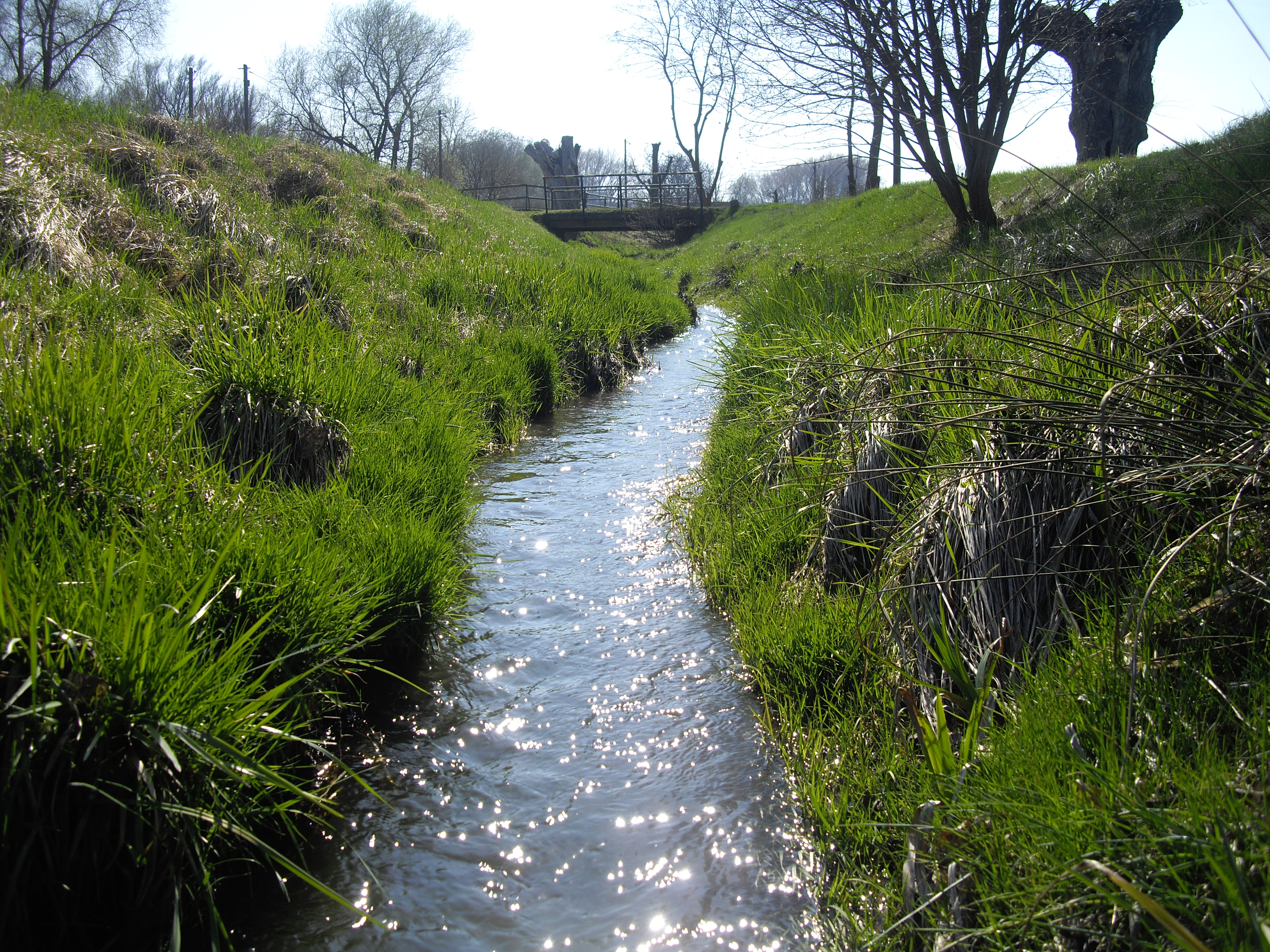

Location
- Country: Germany
- State: Saxony-Anhalt

Physical characteristics
- Mouth
  - location: Schlenze
  - coordinates: 51.6125°N 11.7175°E

Basin features
- Progression: Schlenze→ Saale→ Elbe→ North Sea

Fleischbach is a small river of Saxony-Anhalt, Germany. It flows into the Schlenze near Friedeburg.

== See also ==
- List of rivers of Saxony-Anhalt
