= Helmsdorf =

Helmsdorf may refer to the following places in Germany:

- Helmsdorf, Thuringia, in the Eichsfeld district, Thuringia
- Helmsdorf (Gerbstedt), a locality in Heiligenthal, in Mansfeld-Südharz district, Sachsen-Anhalt
- A locality in Stolpen, in the Sächsische Schweiz district, Saxony
- A locality in Geisenhausen, in Landshut district, Bavaria
