= Marie Ahlers =

German politician (1898–1968)

Member of the Reichstag
- In office 30 September 1930 – 5 March 1933
- Constituency: Merseburg

Personal details
- Born: Marie Albrecht; 4 April 1898 Siersleben
- Died: 17 April 1968 (aged 70)
- Party: SED
- Other political affiliations: KPD(1920-1933); USPD(1918-1920)
- Spouse: Gerhard Taubenheim

Marie Ahlers (born Marie Albrecht: 4 April 1898 — 17 April 1968) was a German politician (KPD/SED). She sat as a member of the Reichstag between 1930 and 1933, and was a senior party official in the Soviet occupation zone and German Democratic Republic after 1945.

== Life ==
Marie Albrecht was born in Siersleben, a small town in the countryside northwest of Halle. Although the little town is surrounded by arable land, it is on the edge of a large coal field, and her father worked as a miner. After leaving school she undertook farm work and worked in clothes making. In 1917 she married Hermann Ahlers.

In 1918 she joined the Independent Social Democratic Party ("Unabhängige Sozialdemokratische Partei Deutschlands" / USPD) which had broken away from the mainstream Social Democratic Party following intense and sustained disagreement within the party following a leadership decision to operate a parliamentary truce for the duration of the war. The next year she joined the Young Socialists. 1919 was also the year in which she was excluded from church membership. In 1920 she joined both the Young Communists and the newly founded Communist Party itself. From the foundation of the "Red Front Women's and Girls' League" (RFMB), which was the women's section of the quasi-military "Red Front Fighters' Alliance" ("Roter Frontkämpferbund") she was a member of its national leadership. Between 1929 and 1933 she served as a town councillor in Eisleben and a member of the enlarged women's secretariat of the Communist Party. She also served, between 1930 and 1933, as a member of the national parliament ("Reichstag"), representing the Merseburg electoral district.

The political backdrop changed abruptly in January 1933 when the Nazi party took power and lost little time in creating a one-party state. The Reichstag fire at the end of February 1933 was instantly blamed, by the authorities, on "communists": politicians with a known communist past found themselves targeted for surveillance and worse. Ahlers did not stand for re-election to the Reichstag in March 1933, the results of which were in any case arranged to give the Nazis a small overall majority in what now became an assembly of greatly diminished relevance. Ahlers found herself persecuted for her involvement in "national high treason" ("Hoch- und Landesverrates", Communist Party work being now illegal) and for a time lived illegally (unregistered and in hiding).

War ended in May 1945, with a large territory in central Germany now administered as the Soviet occupation zone. Communist Party membership and activism were legal for the first time since 1933. Ahlers worked for the party's administration in the Berlin-Tegel quarter and became the leader of the "Antifascist Women's Committee" there. Following the contentious political merger which became the creation, in April 1946, of the Socialist Unity Party ("Sozialistische Einheitspartei Deutschlands" / SED), Ahlers was one of hundreds of thousands of Communist Party members in the Soviet zone who lost no time in signing their party membership across to the SED, which by October 1949 would become the ruling party in the Soviet-sponsored German Democratic Republic. Having joined the SED, she became a member of its local leadership team for Lower Barnim.

Between 1948 and 1953 she served as "second chair" on the national executive of the Agriculture and Forestry Union. Individual trades unions were relatively powerless, but her position as a representative of one of the fourteen recognised trades union s in East Germany made her a member of the ruling body of the important Free German Trade Union Federation ("Freier Deutsche Gewerkschaftsbund" / FDGB). Between 1958 and 1963 Marie Ahlers was a member of the ruling party's Audit Commission.

== Personal ==
After 1930 Marie Ahlers lived with Gerhard Taubenheim (1891–1973). They married in 1945, when she took his name. Some sources concerning the final years of her political career, notably those held in the (formerly West) German Federal Archives, may appear under the name "Marie Taubenheim".
