= Bösenburg =

Coordinates: 51°35′N 11°40′E

Bösenburg is a village in the Mansfeld-Südharz rural district in the German state of Saxony-Anhalt. It is a part of the town Gerbstedt (Ortschaft Rottelsdorf) and is located 5.5 km (3.4 mi) south of Gerbstedt. Through Bösenburg flows the stream Fleischbach.
