= Schlenze =

River in Germany

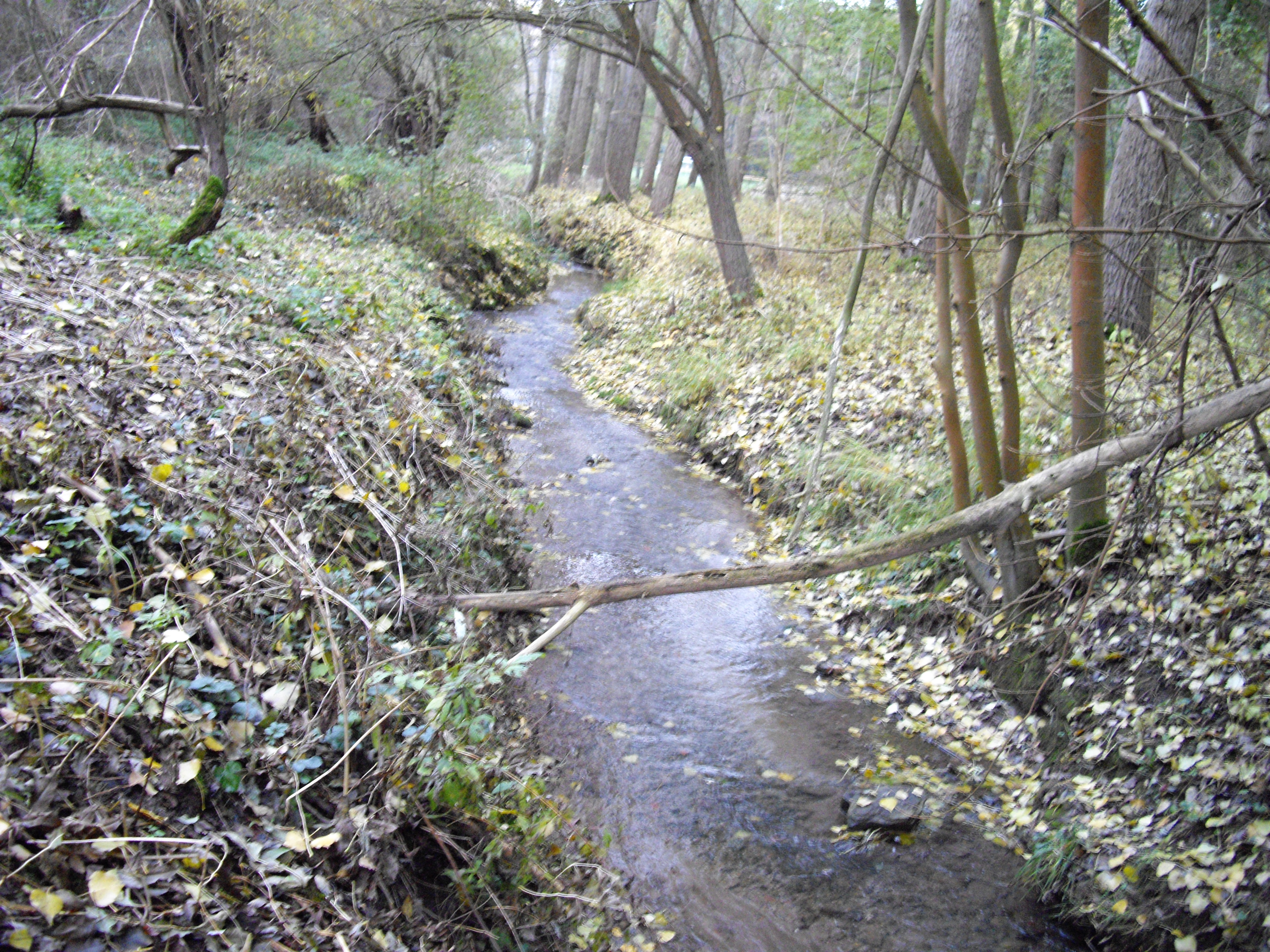

Location
- Country: Germany
- State: Saxony-Anhalt

Physical characteristics
- Mouth
  - location: Saale
  - coordinates: 51°37′14″N 11°44′52″E
- Length: 15 km (9.3 mi)

Basin features
- Progression: Saale→ Elbe→ North Sea

The Schlenze is a river in Saxony-Anhalt, Germany. It is a left-bank tributary of the Saale. It starts at Polleben (a district of Eisleben) and flows into the Saale at Friedeburg.

== See also ==
- List of rivers of Saxony-Anhalt
