= Lodderstedt =

Village in Mandfeld-Südharz, Germany

Coordinates: 51°38′56″N 11°36′17″E

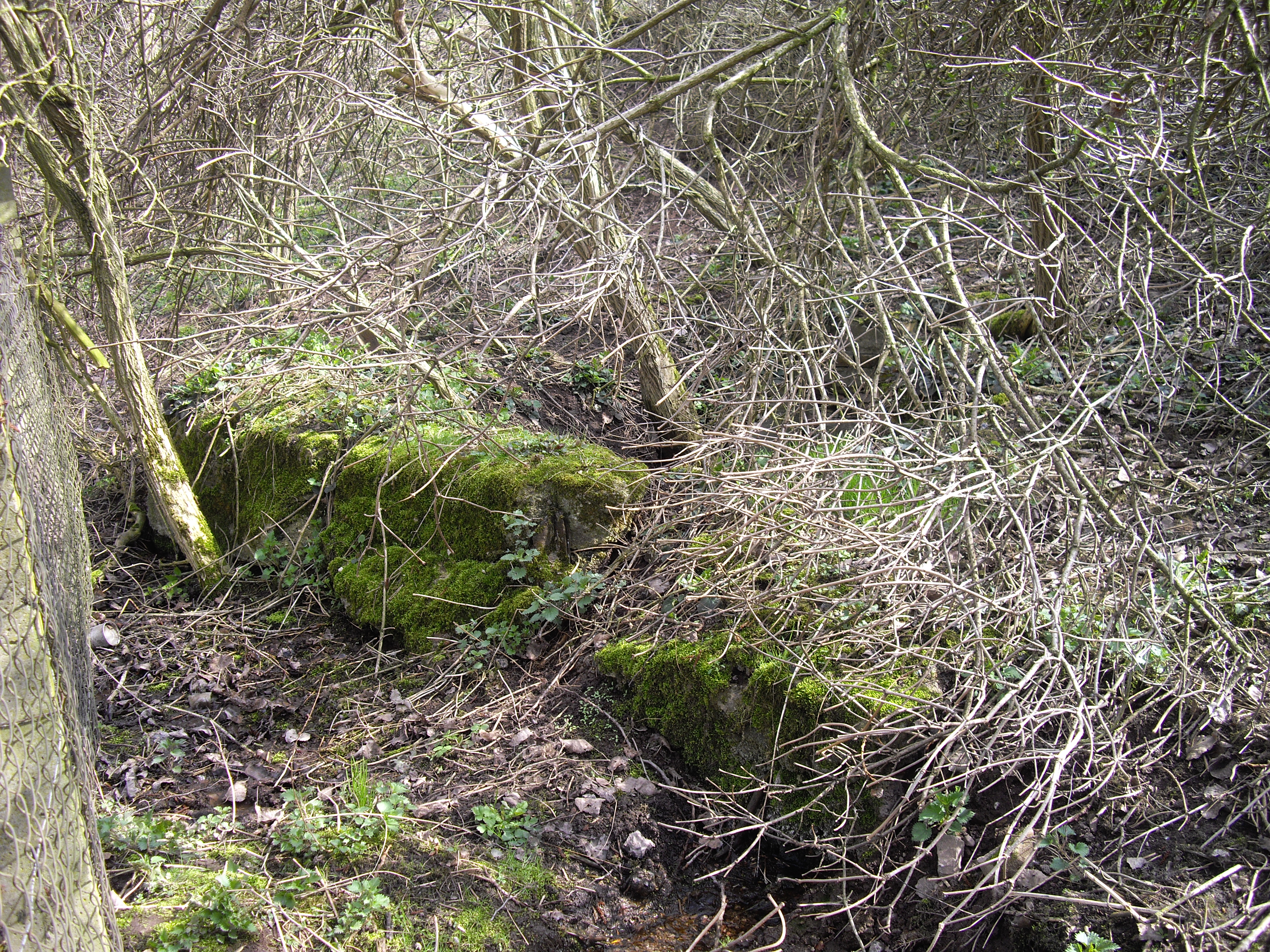
ruins in Lodderstedt

Lodderstedt is an abandoned village in the German Mandfeld-Südharz rural district. It is located lakeside of Lodderstedt, 2.5 kilometers northwest of the town Gerbstedt.

== Name ==
The town name; 'Lodderstedt', means home of Lothar.

== History ==
- The village is thought to have been founded around 500 AD.
- Lodderstedt is thought to have been destroyed in the Halberstadt Bishop's Feud.
- Around 1390, it was officially recorded that Loderstede was an abandoned village.
- In 1560, the church was partially destroyed.
