= Valentin Haussmann =

17th-century German composer

Valentin Haussmann (c. 1560 – c. 1613–14) was a German composer, music editor and poet, known from the publications of his compositions, derived from Italian and Polish models.

== Life ==
Little is known of Haussmann's life, and information is ascertained from the titles, prefaces and dedications of his printed works. He published compositions between 1588 and 1611, and was very active from 1602 to 1606. He appended "Gerbipola" (a Latinized form of Gerbstedt, a town in Saxony-Anhalt) to his name, so this is assumed to be his home town.

It is thought he did not have a permanent position anywhere, but travelled throughout Germany, composing in various places works which he dedicated to princes and towns. There are many songs in German that are derived from Italian canzonettas, and there is instrumental music where he uses the melodies and rhythms of Polish folk music. In later years, from 1606 to 1609, he published, with German translations, villanellas by Luca Marenzio, canzonettas by Orazio Vecchi, tricinia by Giovanni Giacomo Gastoldi and ballets by Thomas Morley.

His publications were evidently popular, since collections went through several editions within a few years.

His biographer in Allgemeine Deutsche Biographie (1880) wrote: "... He is the real mediator between the Italian canzonetta and the German Lied. From the former he took the grace and accomplished manner of expression, and combined it with the German intimacy and heartiness, and thereby achieved in this genre a perfection that we do not come across again in any composer before or after him. But we must not overlook that as a result he indeed lost some depth, and did not reach as far as a Hassler in his love songs, much less surpass."
