= Friedeburgerhütte =

- Stadtteil of Gerbstedt
- Interactive map of Friedeburgerhütte
- Location within Germany Location within Saxony-Anhalt
- Coordinates: 51°37′N 11°41′E
- Country: Germany
- State: Saxony-Anhalt
- District: Mansfeld-Südharz
- Town: Gerbstedt

Area
  - Total: 2.6 km^{2} (1.0 sq mi)
- Elevation: 94 m (308 ft)

Population (2009-12-31)
  - Total: 255
  - Density: 98/km^{2} (250/sq mi)
- Time zone: UTC+01:00 (CET)
  - Summer (DST): UTC+02:00 (CEST)
- Postal codes: 06347
- Dialling codes: 034783

Friedeburgerhütte is a village and a former municipality in the Mansfeld-Südharz district, Saxony-Anhalt, Germany. Since 1 January 2010, it is part of the town Gerbstedt.

On August 6, 2010 the village celebrated the 270th anniversary of its foundation.
