= Freist =

- Stadtteil of Gerbstedt
- Interactive map of Freist
- Location within Germany Location within Saxony-Anhalt
- Coordinates: 51°36′N 11°42′E
- Country: Germany
- State: Saxony-Anhalt
- District: Mansfeld-Südharz
- Town: Gerbstedt

Area
  - Total: 10.14 km^{2} (3.92 sq mi)
- Elevation: 136 m (446 ft)

Population (2006-12-31)
  - Total: 353
  - Density: 34.8/km^{2} (90.2/sq mi)
- Time zone: UTC+01:00 (CET)
  - Summer (DST): UTC+02:00 (CEST)
- Postal codes: 06347
- Dialling codes: 034783

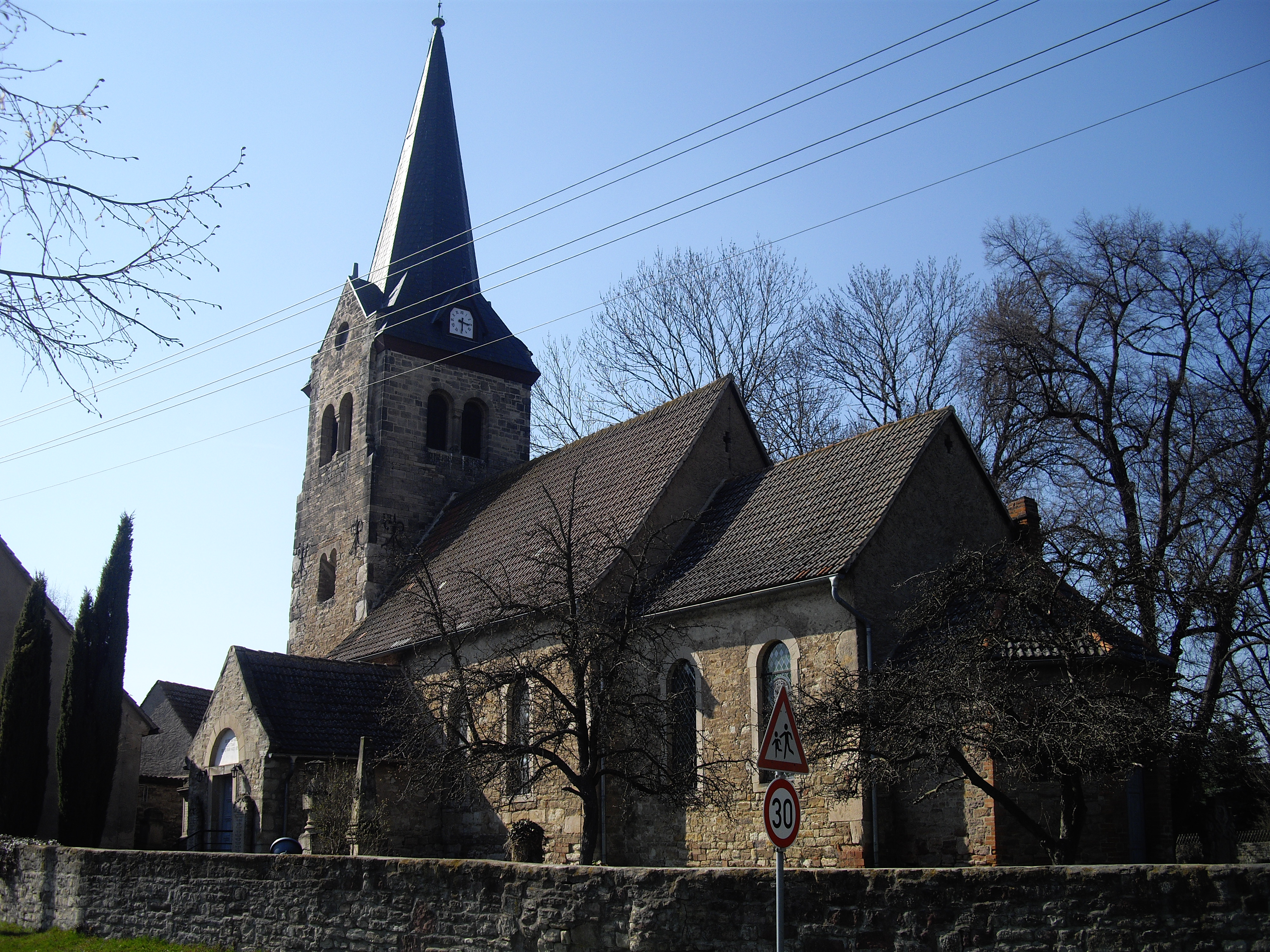
Village church of Freist

Freist is a village and a former municipality in the Mansfeld-Südharz district, Saxony-Anhalt, Germany.

Since 24 January 2010, it is part of the town Gerbstedt.
