= Hübitz =

- Stadtteil of Gerbstedt
- Interactive map of Hübitz
- Location within Germany Location within Saxony-Anhalt
- Coordinates: 51°35′49″N 11°33′15″E
- Country: Germany
- State: Saxony-Anhalt
- District: Mansfeld-Südharz
- Town: Gerbstedt

Area
  - Total: 3.83 km^{2} (1.48 sq mi)
- Elevation: 210 m (690 ft)

Population (2006-12-31)
  - Total: 377
  - Density: 98.4/km^{2} (255/sq mi)
- Time zone: UTC+01:00 (CET)
  - Summer (DST): UTC+02:00 (CEST)
- Postal codes: 06308
- Dialling codes: 03476
- Vehicle registration: MSH
- Website: www.vgem-gerbstedt.de

Hübitz is a village and a former municipality in the Mansfeld-Südharz district, Saxony-Anhalt, Germany.

Since 1 January 2010, it is part of the town Gerbstedt.
