= Augsdorf =

- Stadtteil of Gerbstedt
- Interactive map of Augsdorf
- Location within Germany Location within Saxony-Anhalt
- Coordinates: 51°36′N 11°34′E
- Country: Germany
- State: Saxony-Anhalt
- District: Mansfeld-Südharz
- Town: Gerbstedt

Area
  - Total: 4.51 km^{2} (1.74 sq mi)
- Elevation: 188 m (617 ft)

Population (2009-12-31)
  - Total: 573
  - Density: 127/km^{2} (329/sq mi)
- Time zone: UTC+01:00 (CET)
  - Summer (DST): UTC+02:00 (CEST)
- Postal codes: 06347
- Dialling codes: 03476

Augsdorf is a village and a former municipality in the Mansfeld-Südharz district, Saxony-Anhalt, Germany.

Since 1 January 2010, it is part of the town Gerbstedt.
