= Ihlewitz =

- Stadtteil of Gerbstedt
- Interactive map of Ihlewitz
- Location within Germany Location within Saxony-Anhalt
- Coordinates: 51°38′N 11°40′E
- Country: Germany
- State: Saxony-Anhalt
- District: Mansfeld-Südharz
- Town: Gerbstedt

Area
  - Total: 9.29 km^{2} (3.59 sq mi)
- Elevation: 149 m (489 ft)

Population (2006-12-31)
  - Total: 343
  - Density: 36.9/km^{2} (95.6/sq mi)
- Time zone: UTC+01:00 (CET)
  - Summer (DST): UTC+02:00 (CEST)
- Postal codes: 06347
- Dialling codes: 034783
- Vehicle registration: MSH
- Website: www.mansfelderland.de

Ihlewitz is a village and a former municipality in the Mansfeld-Südharz district, Saxony-Anhalt, Germany.

Since 1 January 2010, it is part of the town Gerbstedt.
