= Zabenstedt =

- Stadtteil of Gerbstedt
- Interactive map of Zabenstedt
- Location within Germany Location within Saxony-Anhalt
- Coordinates: 51°37′N 11°40′E
- Country: Germany
- State: Saxony-Anhalt
- District: Mansfeld-Südharz
- Town: Gerbstedt

Area
  - Total: 4.89 km^{2} (1.89 sq mi)
- Elevation: 152 m (499 ft)

Population (2006-12-31)
  - Total: 222
  - Density: 45.4/km^{2} (118/sq mi)
- Time zone: UTC+01:00 (CET)
  - Summer (DST): UTC+02:00 (CEST)
- Postal codes: 06347
- Dialling codes: 034783

Zabenstedt is a village and a former municipality in the Mansfeld-Südharz district, Saxony-Anhalt, Germany.

Since 1 January 2010, it is part of the town Gerbstedt.
