= Rottelsdorf =

- Stadtteil of Gerbstedt
- Interactive map of Rottelsdorf
- Location within Germany Location within Saxony-Anhalt
- Coordinates: 51°35′N 11°41′E
- Country: Germany
- State: Saxony-Anhalt
- District: Mansfeld-Südharz
- Town: Gerbstedt

Area
  - Total: 7.98 km^{2} (3.08 sq mi)
- Elevation: 162 m (531 ft)

Population (2009-12-31)
  - Total: 324
  - Density: 40.6/km^{2} (105/sq mi)
- Time zone: UTC+01:00 (CET)
  - Summer (DST): UTC+02:00 (CEST)
- Postal codes: 06295
- Dialling codes: 034773

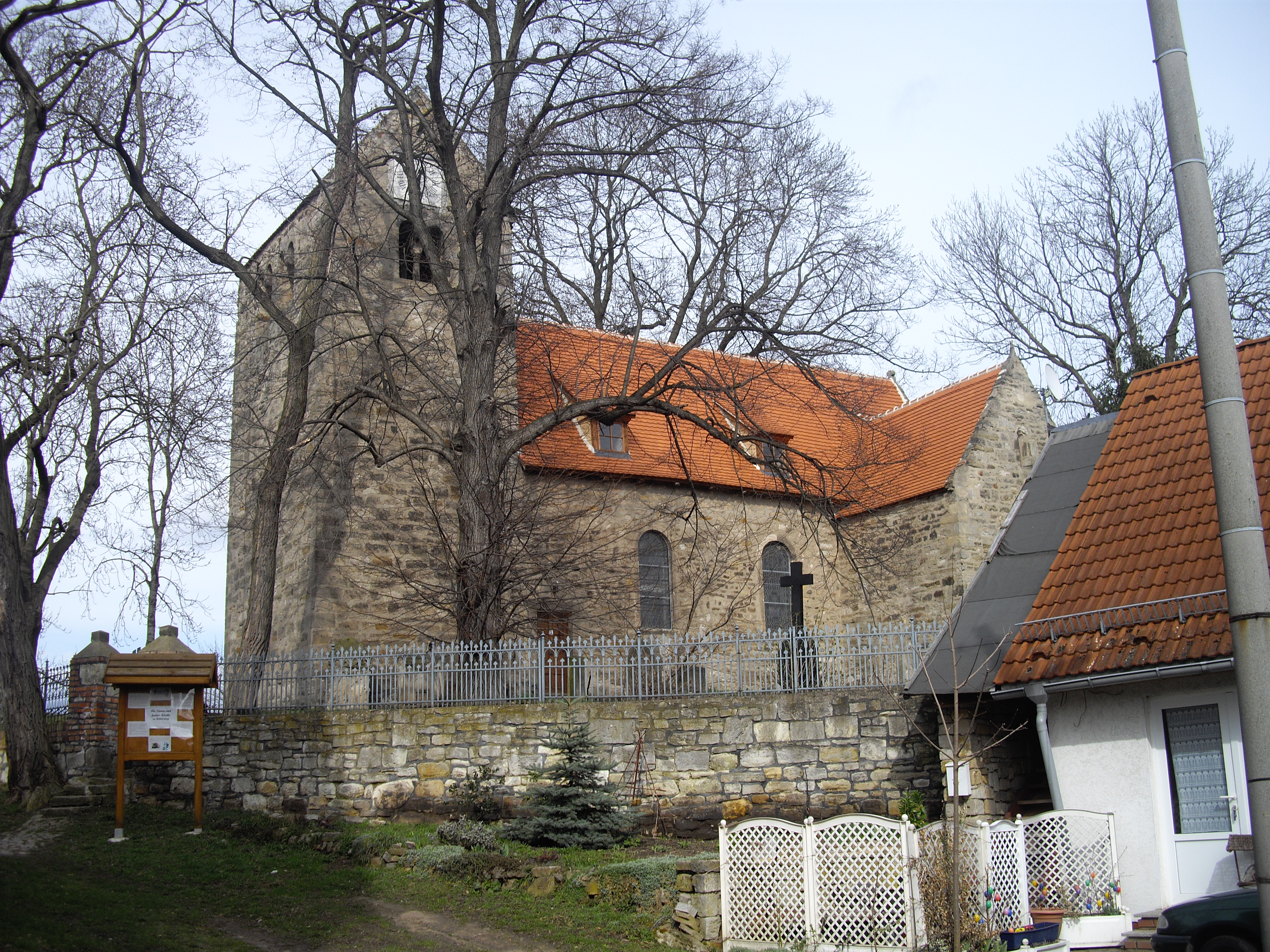
Main church of the village Rottelsdorf

Rottelsdorf is a village and a former municipality in the Mansfeld-Südharz district, Saxony-Anhalt, Germany. It absorbed the former municipality Bösenburg in 1974. Since 1 January 2010, it is part of the town Gerbstedt.
