= Welfesholz =

- Stadtteil of Gerbstedt
- Interactive map of Welfesholz
- Location within Germany Location within Saxony-Anhalt
- Coordinates: 51°38′N 11°34′E
- Country: Germany
- State: Saxony-Anhalt
- District: Mansfeld-Südharz
- Town: Gerbstedt

Area
  - Total: 3.90 km^{2} (1.51 sq mi)
- Elevation: 199 m (653 ft)

Population (2006-12-31)
  - Total: 210
  - Density: 54/km^{2} (140/sq mi)
- Time zone: UTC+01:00 (CET)
  - Summer (DST): UTC+02:00 (CEST)
- Postal codes: 06347
- Dialling codes: 034783

Welfesholz is a village and a former municipality in the Mansfeld-Südharz district, Saxony-Anhalt, Germany. Since 1 January 2010, it is part of the town Gerbstedt. The place became famous because of the Battle of Welfesholz in 1115.
