= Siersleben =

- Ortsteil of Gerbstedt
- Interactive map of Siersleben
- Location within Germany Location within Saxony-Anhalt
- Coordinates: 51°36′N 11°33′E
- Country: Germany
- State: Saxony-Anhalt
- District: Mansfeld-Südharz
- Town: Gerbstedt
- Elevation: 209 m (686 ft)

Population (2008-12-31)
  - Total: 1,472
- Time zone: UTC+01:00 (CET)
  - Summer (DST): UTC+02:00 (CEST)
- Postal codes: 06308
- Dialling codes: 03476
- Vehicle registration: MSH

Siersleben is a part of the town Gerbstedt and a village in the Mansfeld-Südharz district, Saxony-Anhalt, Germany. It is located 10 km north of the Lutherstadt (Town of Luther) Eisleben and 5 km south of Hettstedt and has a population of 1,472 people.

Since 1 January 2010, it is part of the town Gerbstedt.
