= Rote Welle (Wipper) =

River in Germany

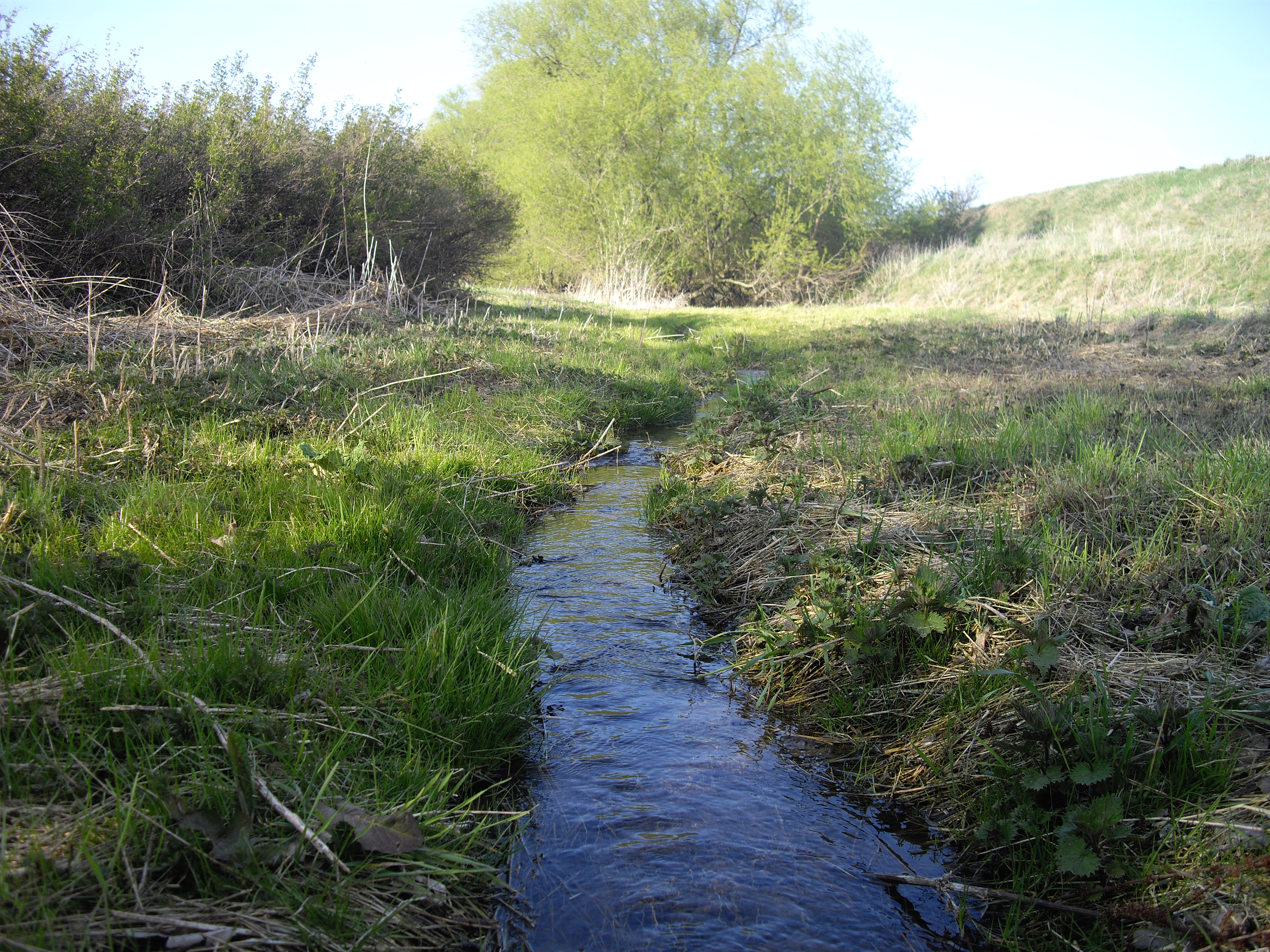

Location
- Country: Germany
- States: Saxony-Anhalt

Physical characteristics
- Mouth
  - location: Wipper
  - coordinates: 51.6675°N 11.5592°E

Basin features
- Progression: Wipper→ Saale→ Elbe→ North Sea

Rote Welle is a river of Saxony-Anhalt, Germany. It flows into the Wipper near Sandersleben.

== See also ==
- List of rivers of Saxony-Anhalt
