= Heiligenthal, Saxony-Anhalt =

Heiligenthal
- Stadtteil of Gerbstedt
- Interactive map of Heiligenthal
- Location within Germany Location within Saxony-Anhalt
- Coordinates: 51°37′N 11°38′E
- Country: Germany
- State: Saxony-Anhalt
- District: Mansfeld-Südharz
- Town: Gerbstedt

Area
  - Total: 17.09 km^{2} (6.60 sq mi)
- Elevation: 123 m (404 ft)

Population (2006-12-31)
  - Total: 826
  - Density: 48.3/km^{2} (125/sq mi)
- Time zone: UTC+01:00 (CET)
  - Summer (DST): UTC+02:00 (CEST)
- Postal codes: 06347
- Dialling codes: 034783

Heiligenthal is a village and a former municipality in the Mansfeld-Südharz district, Saxony-Anhalt, Germany.

Since 24 January 2010, it is part of the town Gerbstedt.
