= Friedeburg, Saxony-Anhalt =

Friedeburg
- Stadtteil of Gerbstedt
- Interactive map of Friedeburg
- Location within Germany Location within Saxony-Anhalt
- Coordinates: 51°37′N 11°43′E
- Country: Germany
- State: Saxony-Anhalt
- District: Mansfeld-Südharz
- Town: Gerbstedt

Area
  - Total: 6.51 km^{2} (2.51 sq mi)
- Elevation: 70 m (230 ft)

Population (2009-12-31)
  - Total: 462
  - Density: 71.0/km^{2} (184/sq mi)
- Time zone: UTC+01:00 (CET)
  - Summer (DST): UTC+02:00 (CEST)
- Postal codes: 06347
- Dialling codes: 034783
- Vehicle registration: MSH

Friedeburg is a village and a former municipality in the Mansfeld-Südharz district, Saxony-Anhalt, Germany.

Since 24 January 2010, it is part of the town Gerbstedt.
