= Gerbstedt =

- Town
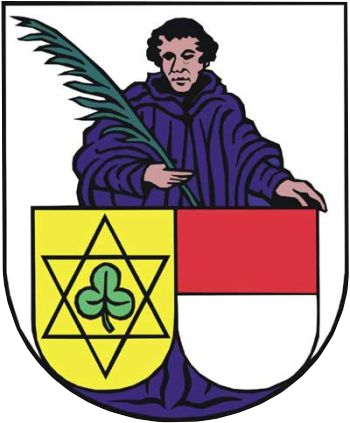
- Coat of arms

- Location of Gerbstedt within Mansfeld-Südharz district
- Interactive map of Gerbstedt
- Location within Germany Location within Saxony-Anhalt
- Coordinates: 51°38′N 11°37′E
- Country: Germany
- State: Saxony-Anhalt
- District: Mansfeld-Südharz
- Subdivisions: 9

Government
  - Mayor (2021–28): Ulf Döring (CDU)

Area
  - Total: 102.31 km^{2} (39.50 sq mi)
- Elevation: 155 m (509 ft)

Population (2025-12-31)
  - Total: 6,543
  - Density: 63.95/km^{2} (165.6/sq mi)
- Time zone: UTC+01:00 (CET)
  - Summer (DST): UTC+02:00 (CEST)
- Postal codes: 06347
- Dialling codes: 03476, 034773, 034783
- Vehicle registration: MSH, EIL, HET, ML, SGH

Gerbstedt (German pronunciation: [ˈɡɛʁpˌʃtɛt]) is a small town in Saxony-Anhalt, district Mansfeld-Südharz. It was traditionally dominated by copper mining, presently agriculture is dominant.

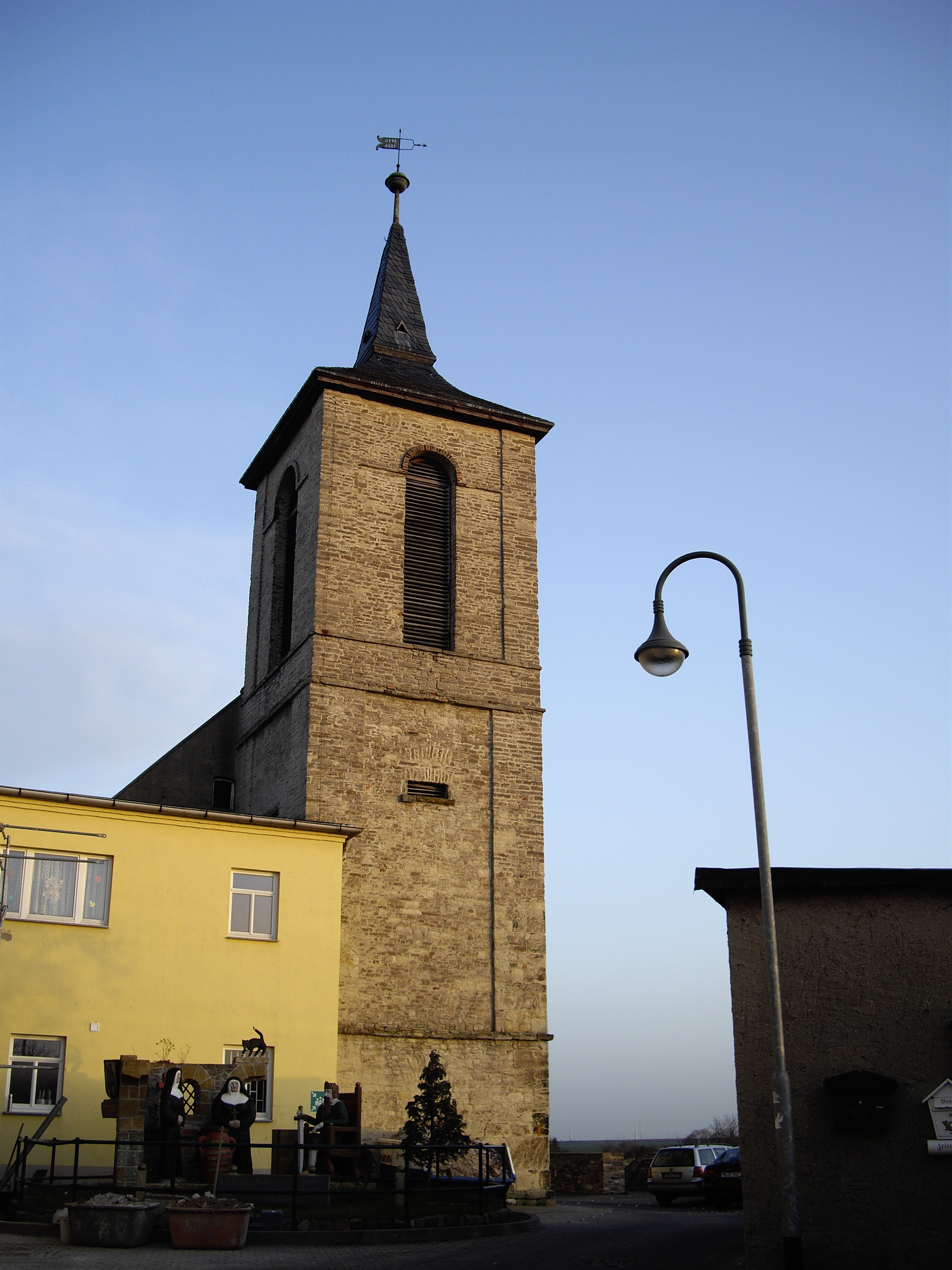
Tower of former monastery Gerbstedt

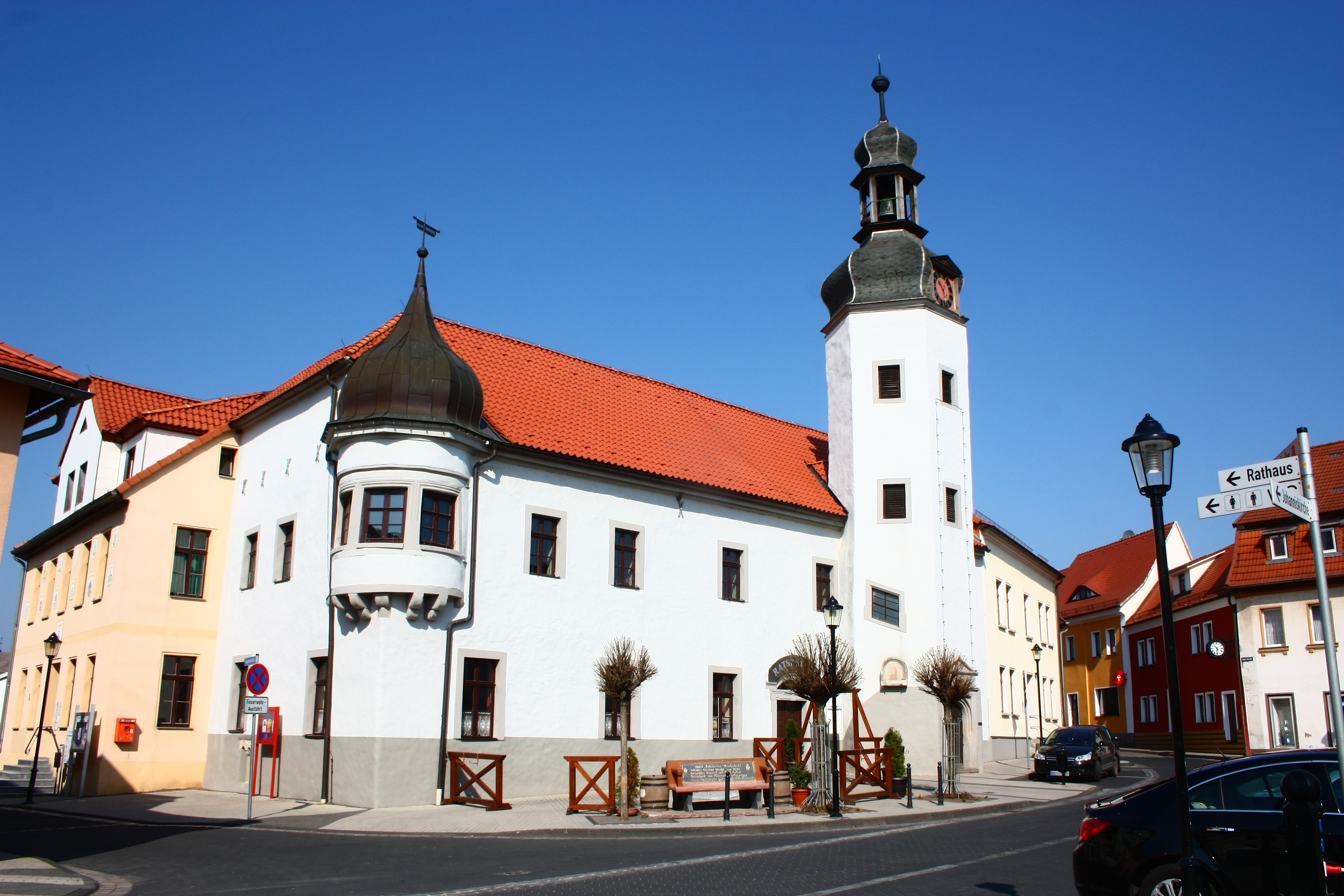
Town hall Gerbstedt

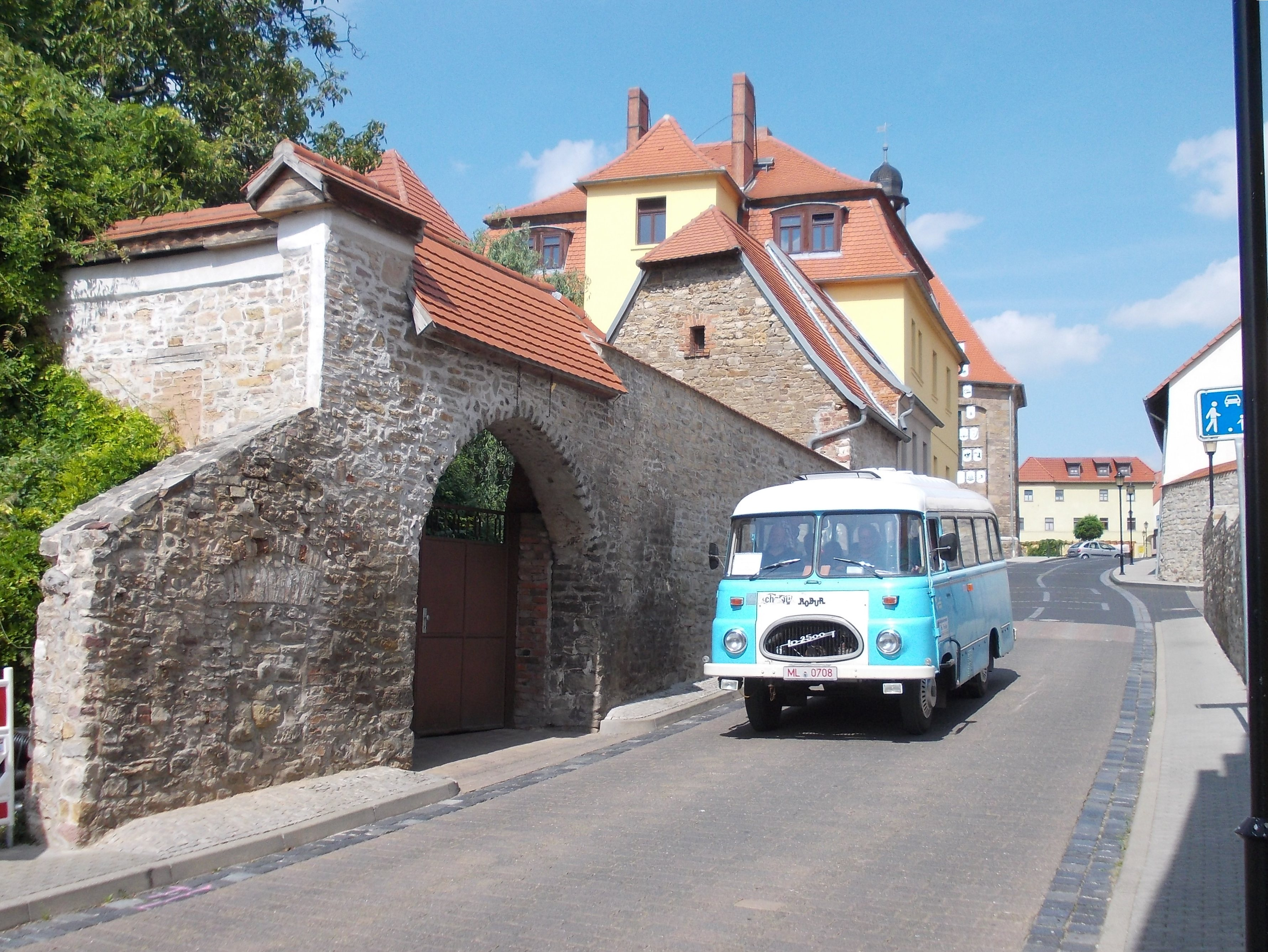
View of Gerbstedt with a rare Robur bus

== Geography ==
The town Gerbstedt is located 9 km (5.59 mi) west of Hettstedt and 13 km (8.08 mi) north of the town Eisleben.

=== Divisions ===
The town of Gerbstedt is divided into twelve localities (Ortschaften), corresponding to the twelve former municipalities that formed the current town in 2010. Some of the localities consist of a number of Ortsteile (local parts).

- Augsdorf
- Freist (incl. Elben, Oeste, Reidewitz, Zabitz)
- Friedeburg
- Friedeburgerhütte (incl. Adendorf)
- Gerbstedt
- Heiligenthal (incl. Helmsdorf, Lochwitz)
- Hübitz
- Ihlewitz (incl. Pfeiffhausen, Straußhof, Thaldorf)
- Rottelsdorf (incl. Bösenburg)
- Siersleben (incl. Thondorf)
- Welfesholz
- Zabenstedt

== Sons and daughters of the town ==
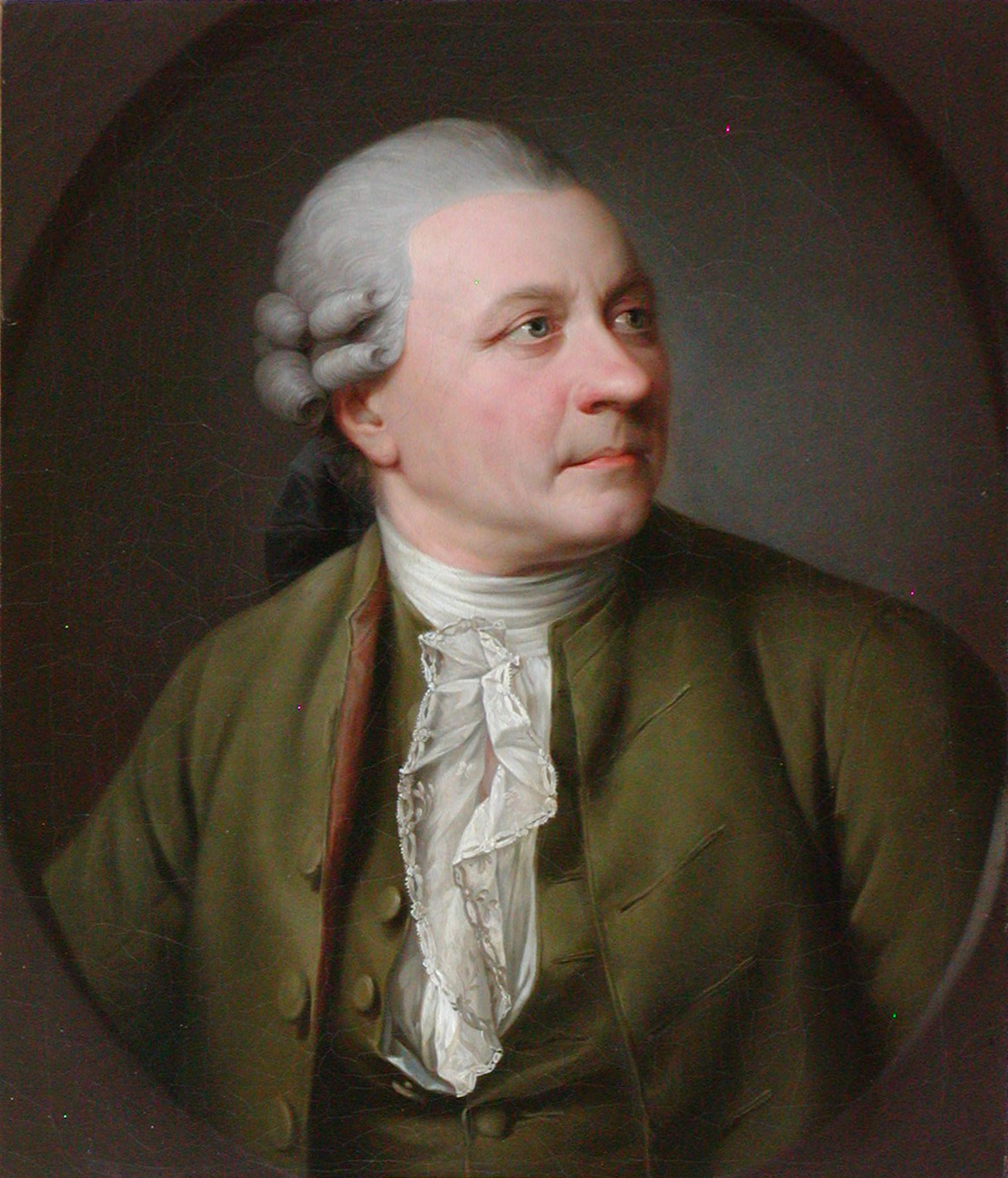
Friedrich Gottlieb Klopstock around 1779

- Otto Brosowski (1885–1947), mining worker, KPD member
- Eugen Ray (1957–1986), athlete
- Valentin Haussmann (died c. 1611), composer

== Other persons associated with Gerbstedt ==
- Rikdag, (died 985), Margrave of Meißen
- Friedrich Gottlieb Klopstock, (1724–1803), poet, spent his youth in Friedeburg
- Eckard I, Margrave of Meissen, buried in the Abbey
