= Sabratha =

City in Libya

Sabratha صبراتة
- Town
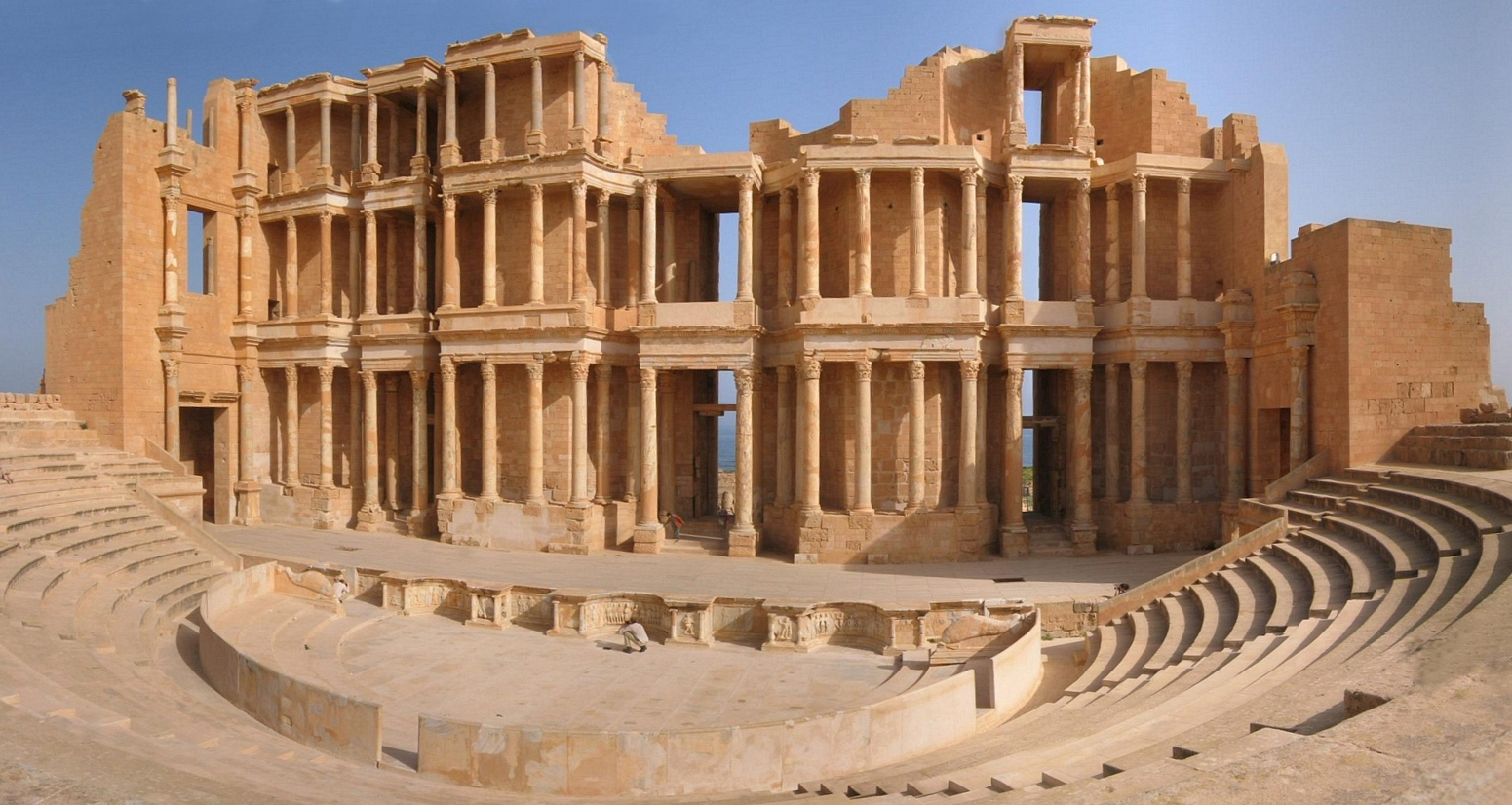
- Theater of Sabratha

- Location in Libya
- Coordinates: 32°47′32″N 12°29′3″E
- Country: Libya
- Region: Tripolitania
- District: Zawiya
- Elevation: 33 ft (10 m)

Population (2004)
  - Total: 102,038
- Time zone: UTC+2 (EET)
- Website: sabratha.gov.ly

UNESCO World Heritage Site
- Official name: Archaeological Site of Sabratha
- Includes: Ancient theater of Sabratha
- Criteria: Cultural: (iii)
- Reference: 184
- Inscription: 1982 (6th Session)
- Endangered: 2016–...
- Coordinates: 32.8054017588935°N 12.485187948145375°E

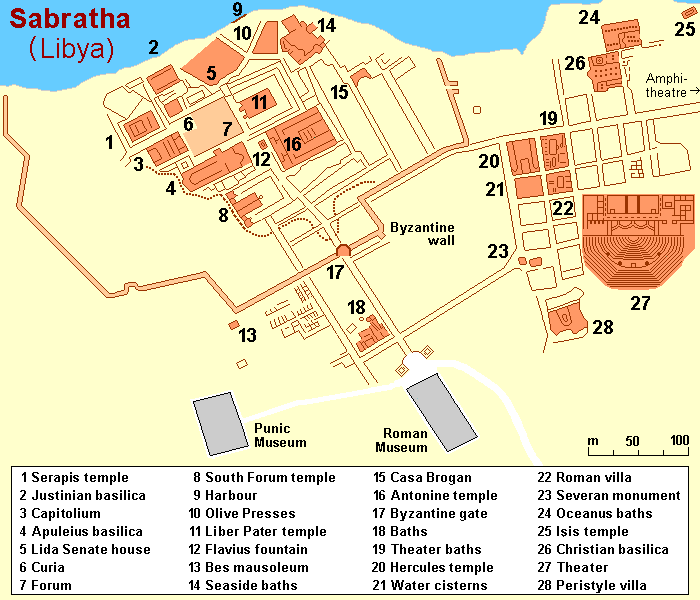
Map of Sabratha

Sabratha (Arabic: صبراتة, romanized: Ṣabrāta; also Sabratah, Siburata), in the Zawiya District of Libya, was the westernmost of the ancient "three cities" of Roman Tripolis, alongside Oea and Leptis Magna. From 2001 to 2007 it was the capital of the former Sabratha wa Sorman District. It lies on the Mediterranean coast about 70 km (43 mi) west of modern Tripoli. The extant archaeological site was inscribed as a UNESCO World Heritage Site in 1982.

== History ==
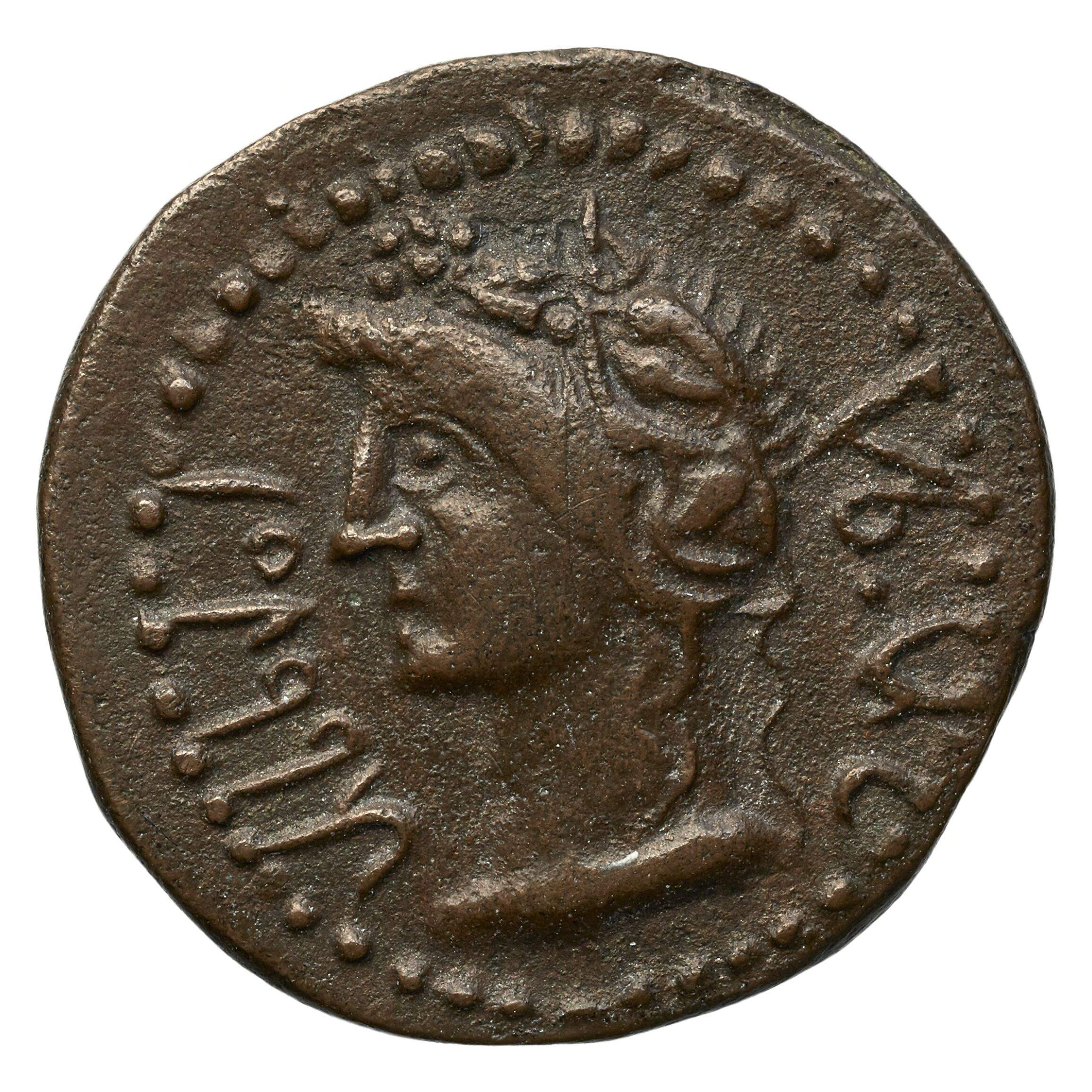
A coin of Sabratha with the Punic name ṣbrtʿn

Sabratha's port was established, perhaps about 500 BCE, as the Phoenician trading-post of Tsabratan (Punic: 𐤑𐤁𐤓𐤕𐤍, ṣbrtn, or 𐤑𐤁𐤓𐤕𐤏𐤍, ṣbrtʿn). This seems to have been a Berber name, suggesting a preëxisting native settlement. The port served as a Phoenician outlet for the products of the African hinterland. Greeks called it Sabrata (Ancient Greek: Σαβράτα), Sabaratha (Ancient Greek: Σαβαραθά), Sabratha (Ancient Greek: Σαβράθα) and also Abrotonon (Ancient Greek: Ἀβρότονον). After the demise of Phoenicia, Sabratha fell under the sphere of influence of Carthage.

Following the Punic Wars, Sabratha became part of the short-lived Numidian kingdom of Massinissa before this was annexed to the Roman Republic as the province of Africa Nova in the 1st century BC. It was subsequently romanized and rebuilt in the 2nd and 3rd centuries CE.

Emperor Septimius Severus was born in nearby Leptis Magna, and Sabratha reached its monumental peak during the rule of the Severan dynasty he founded, expanding nearly twice its previous size. The city was badly damaged by earthquakes during the 4th century, particularly the quake of 365. It fell under control of the Vandal kingdom in the 5th century, with large parts of the city being abandoned. It enjoyed a small revival under Byzantine rule, when multiple churches and a defensive wall (although only enclosing a small portion of the city) were erected. The town was site of a bishopric. Within a hundred years of the Muslim invasion of the Maghreb, trade had shifted to other ports and Sabratha dwindled to a village.

== Archaeology ==
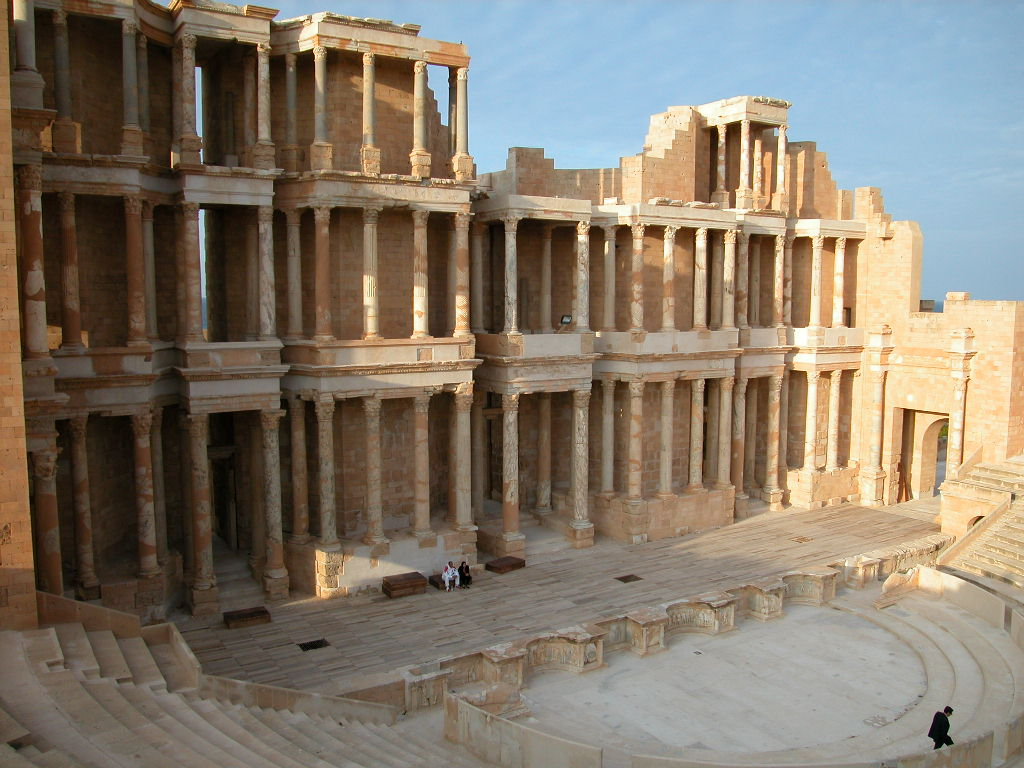
Archaeological Site of Sabratha

Besides its Theater that retains its three-storey architectural backdrop, Sabratha has temples dedicated to Liber Pater, Serapis and Isis. There is a Christian basilica of the time of Justinian and also remnants of some of the mosaic floors that enriched elite dwellings of Roman North Africa (for example, at the Villa Sileen, near Khoms). However, these are most clearly preserved in the colored patterns of the seaward (or Forum) baths, directly overlooking the shore, and in the black and white floors of the theater baths. There is an adjacent museum containing some treasures from Sabratha, but others can be seen in the national museum in Tripoli.

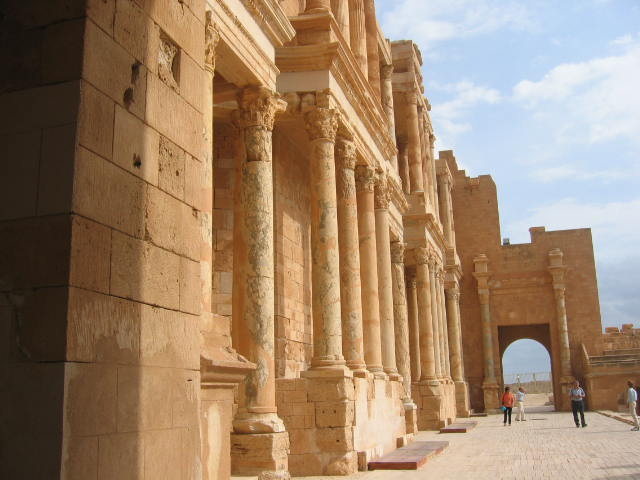
Theatre, 2006

In 186 AD, Emperor Commodus dedicated a temple in Sabratha honoring Hercules and his father, Marcus Aurelius. The temple featured a podium structure with porticoes and apsidal rooms at the southern ends. Excavations revealed wall fragments with marble-clad lower sections and painted upper parts. One scene in the western apse showed Commodus being carried to heaven on an eagle, about to join the gods. The eastern apse's decoration is less clear, but fragments suggest an armed Dea Roma (a personification of Rome).

=== Research history ===
Sabratha has been the place of several excavation campaigns since 1921, mainly by Italian archaeologists. It was also excavated by a British team directed by Dame Kathleen Kenyon and John Ward-Perkins between 1948 and 1951.

In 1943, during the Second World War, archaeologist Max Mallowan, husband of novelist Agatha Christie, was based at Sabratha as an assistant to the Senior Civil Affairs Officer of the Western Province of Tripolitania. His main task was to oversee the allocation of grain rations, but it was, in the words of Christie's biographer, a "glorious attachment", during which Mallowan lived in an Italian villa with a patio overlooking the sea and dined on fresh tunny fish and olives.

=== Erosion and weathering damage ===
According to an April 2016 report, due to soft soil composition and the nature of the coast of Sabratha, which is mostly made up of soft rock and sand, the Ruins of Sabratha are undergoing dangerous periods of coastal erosion. The public baths, olive press building and 'harbor' can be observed as being most damaged as the buildings have crumbled due to storms and unsettled seas. As the most common building material in Sabratah, calcarenite, is highly susceptible to physical, chemical and biological weathering (particularly marine spray), the long-term conservation of the monuments is endangered. Rising sea levels can also compromise the integrity of the site.

This erosion of the coast of Ancient Sabratha can be seen yearly with significant differences in beach layout and recent crumbled buildings. Breakwaters set in the vicinity of the harbor and olive press are inadequate and too small to efficiently protect the Ancient City of Sabratha.

== Modern Sabratha ==
The city is home to Sabratha University. Wefaq Sabratha is the football club, playing at Sabratha Stadium.

As noted in the 2021 documentary The Beatles: Get Back, directed by Peter Jackson, the Sabratha Theater was considered as a possible location where the Beatles could hold their final live concert as a group (they instead performed their last concert on the rooftop of their Apple Corps headquarters).

== Climate ==
Sabratha has a hot semi-arid climate (Köppen climate classification BSh).

Climate data for Sabratha
Month	Jan	Feb	Mar	Apr	May	Jun	Jul	Aug	Sep	Oct	Nov	Dec	Year
Mean daily maximum °C (°F)	17.2 (63.0)	18.8 (65.8)	20.9 (69.6)	23.7 (74.7)	25.9 (78.6)	29.2 (84.6)	31.3 (88.3)	32.1 (89.8)	30.2 (86.4)	27.5 (81.5)	23.6 (74.5)	18.8 (65.8)	24.9 (76.9)
Mean daily minimum °C (°F)	6.8 (44.2)	7.9 (46.2)	9.9 (49.8)	13.1 (55.6)	15.4 (59.7)	19.0 (66.2)	20.0 (68.0)	21.1 (70.0)	20.3 (68.5)	17.0 (62.6)	12.2 (54.0)	8.1 (46.6)	14.2 (57.6)
Average precipitation mm (inches)	45 (1.8)	26 (1.0)	17 (0.7)	11 (0.4)	4 (0.2)	1 (0.0)	0 (0)	0 (0)	8 (0.3)	23 (0.9)	33 (1.3)	51 (2.0)	219 (8.6)
Source: Climate-data.org

== Gallery ==
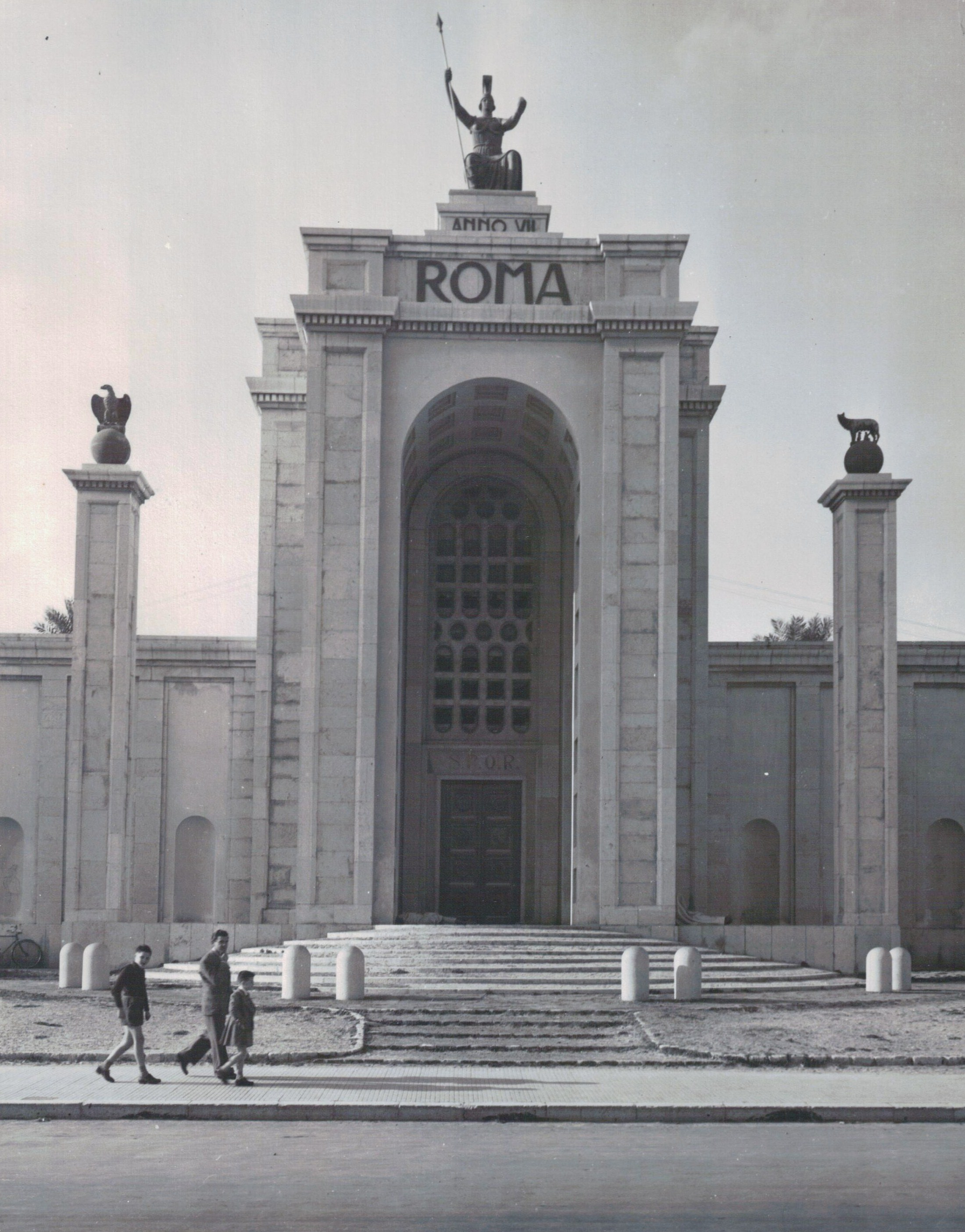
Part of the International Fairgrounds in Tripoli (under Italian rule)

=== Panorama ===
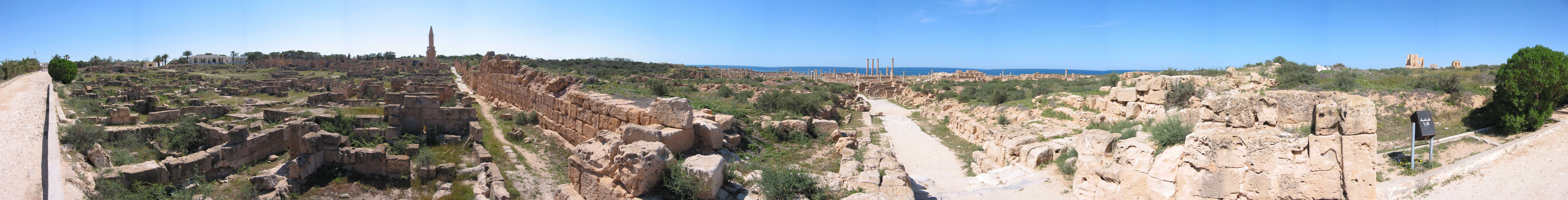
Panoramic image of a part of the archaeological site

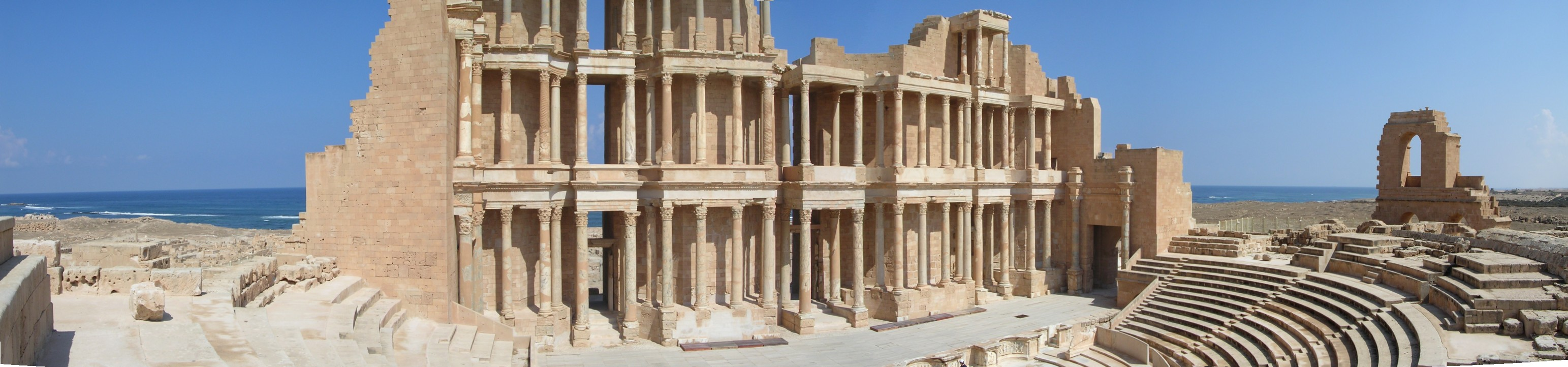
Panoramic image of the theater of the archaeological site

=== Archaeological site ===
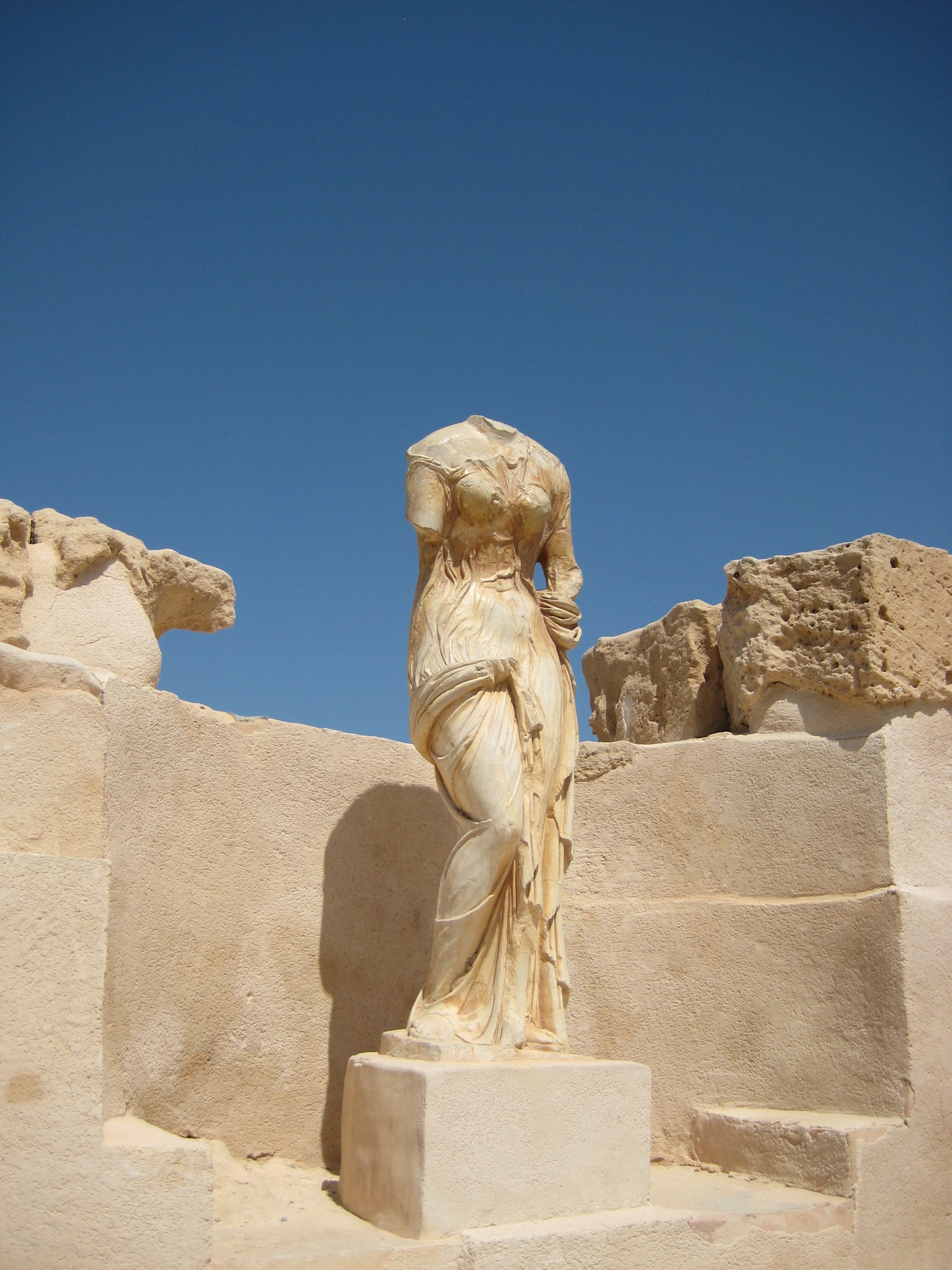
Nymphaeum

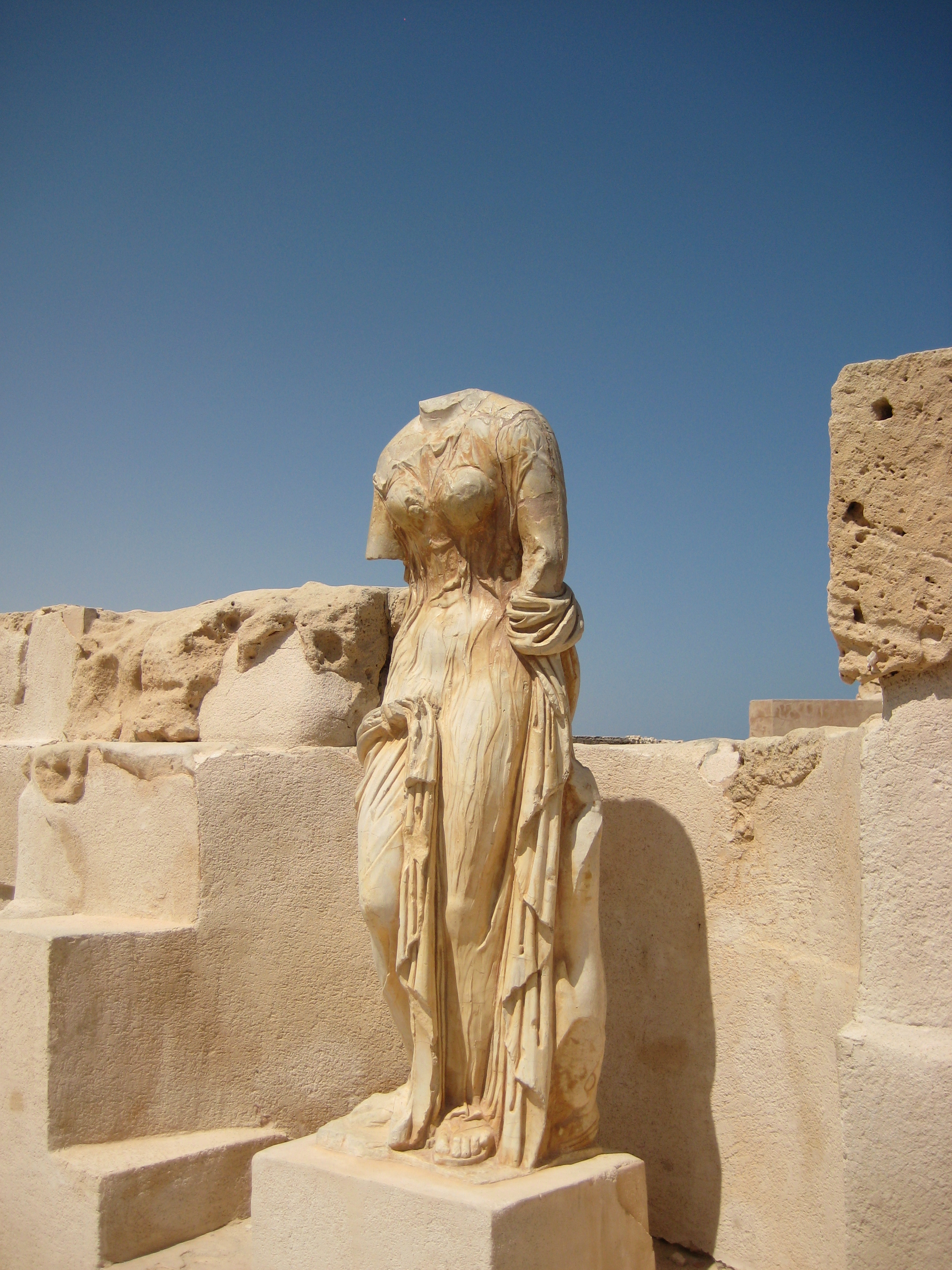
Nymphaeum

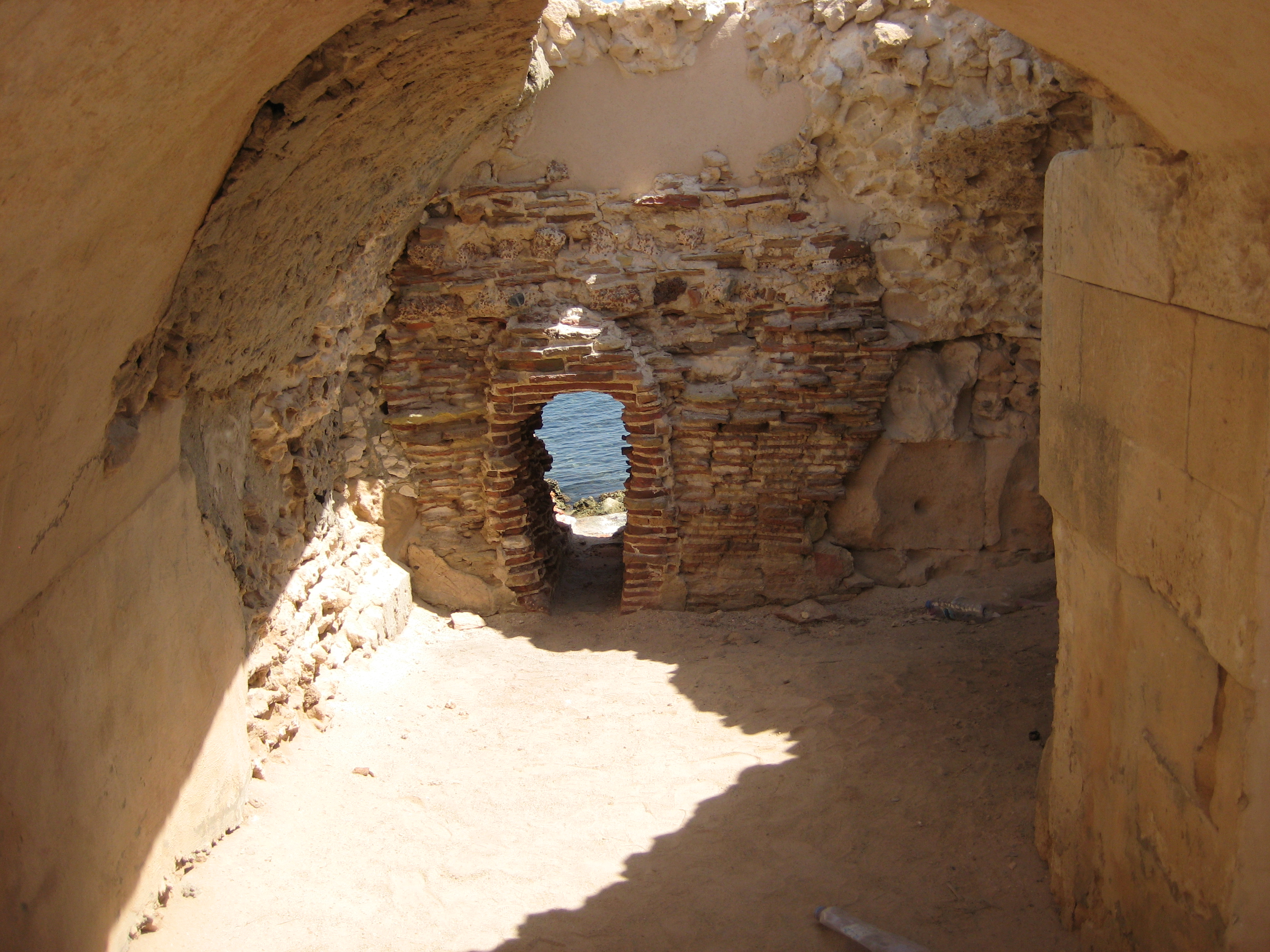
Seaside therms

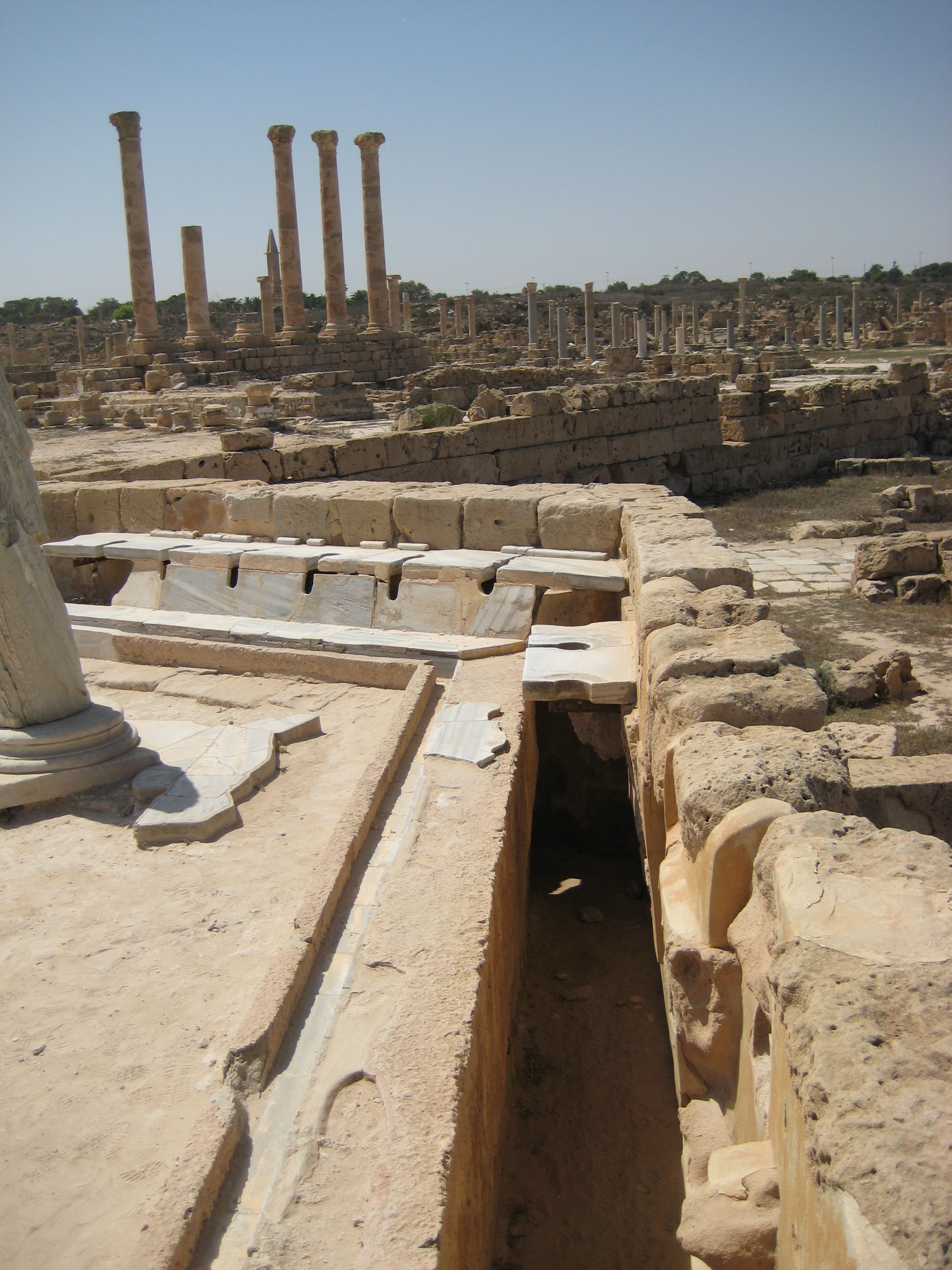
Latrines

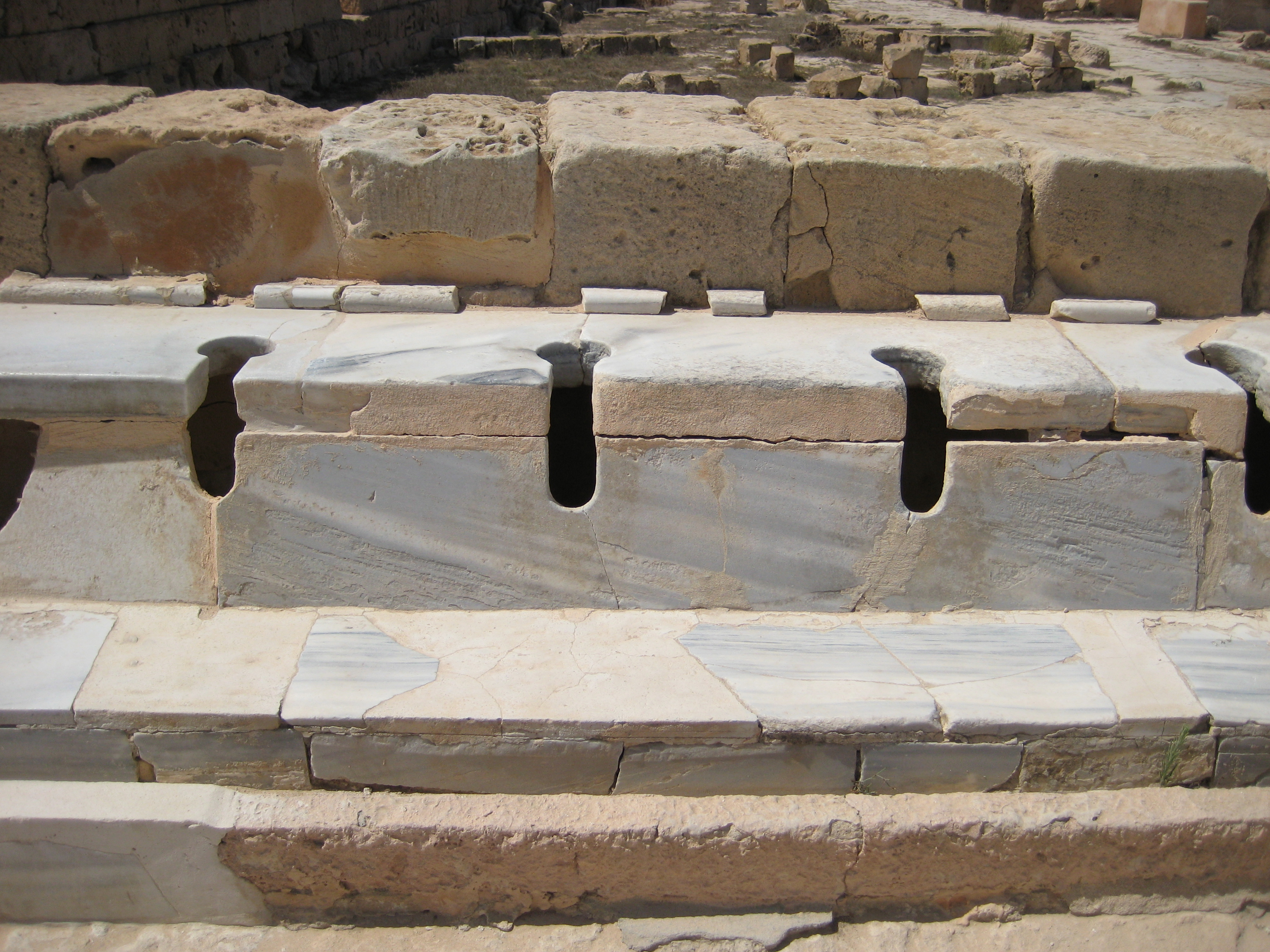
Latrines

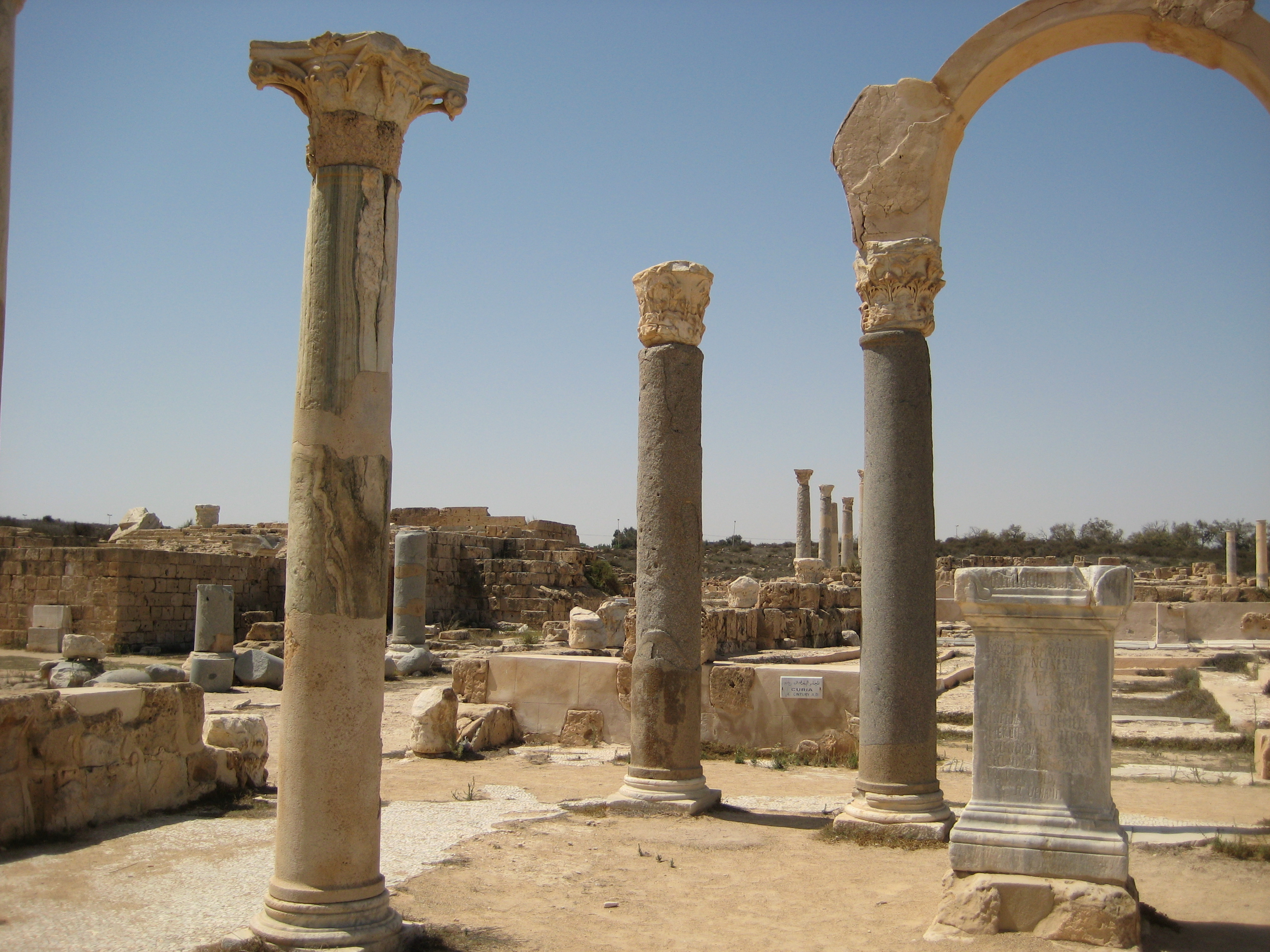
Сouncil chamber

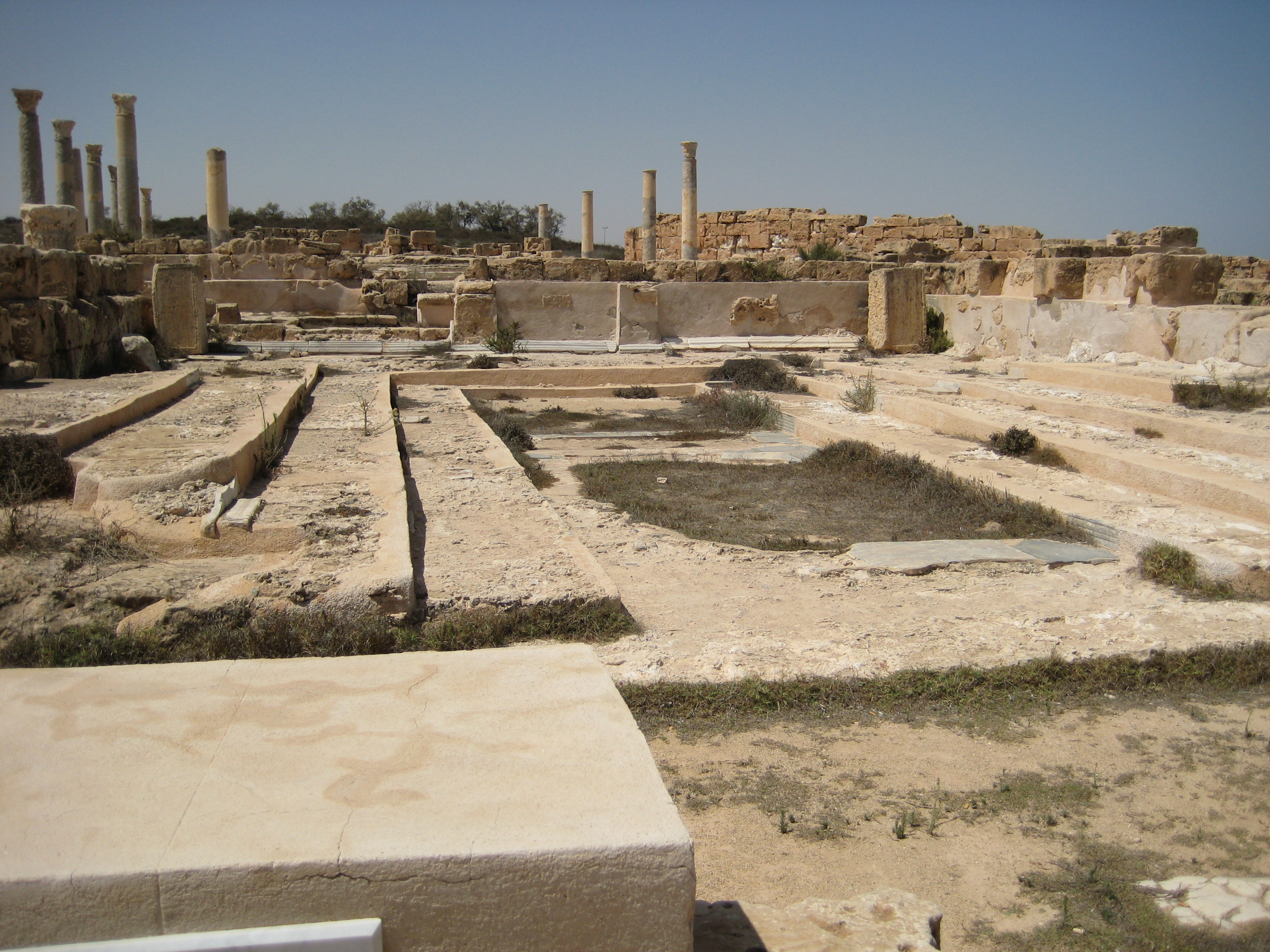
Curia 4 CE

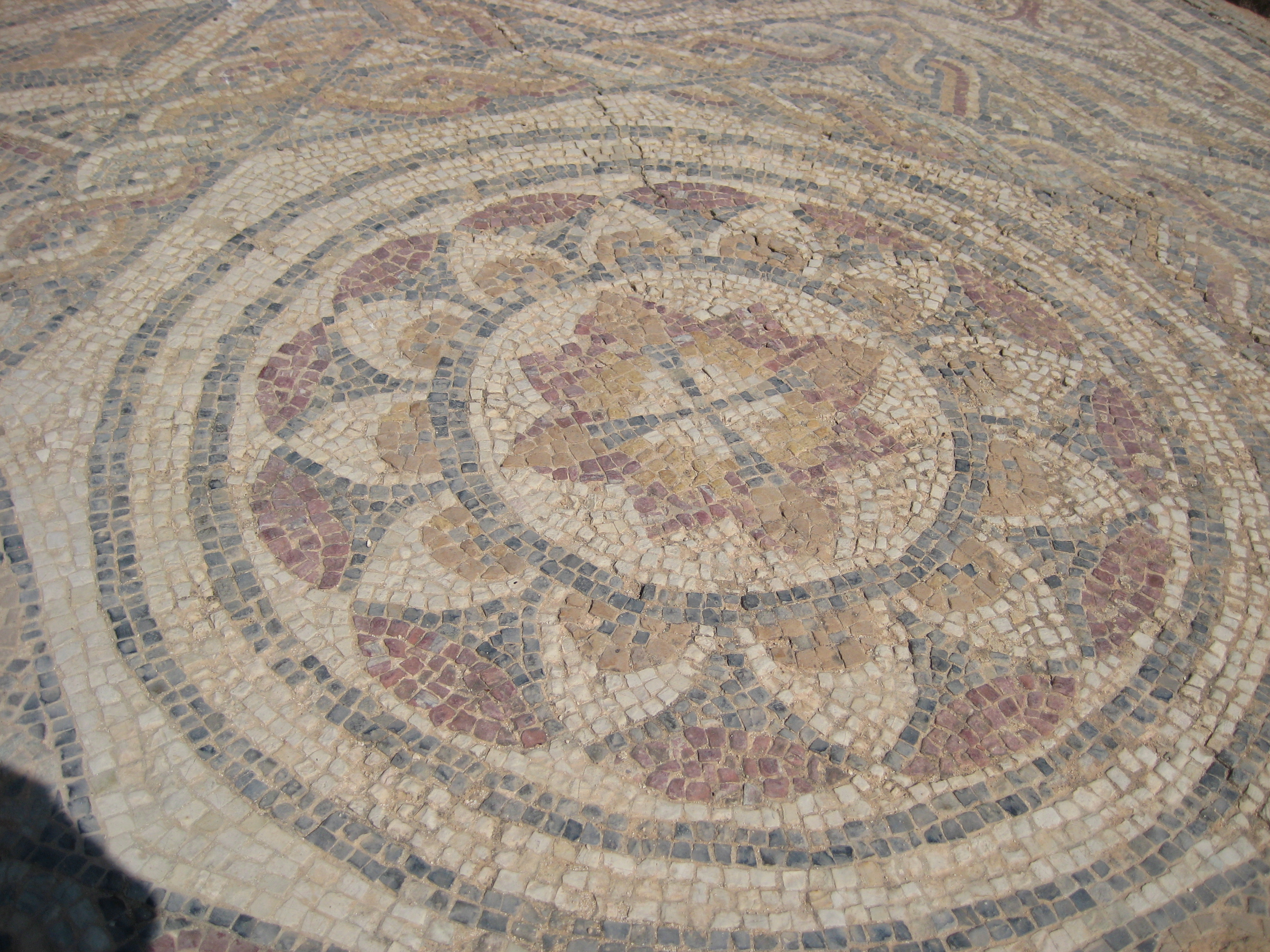
Mosaic in the Peristyle house

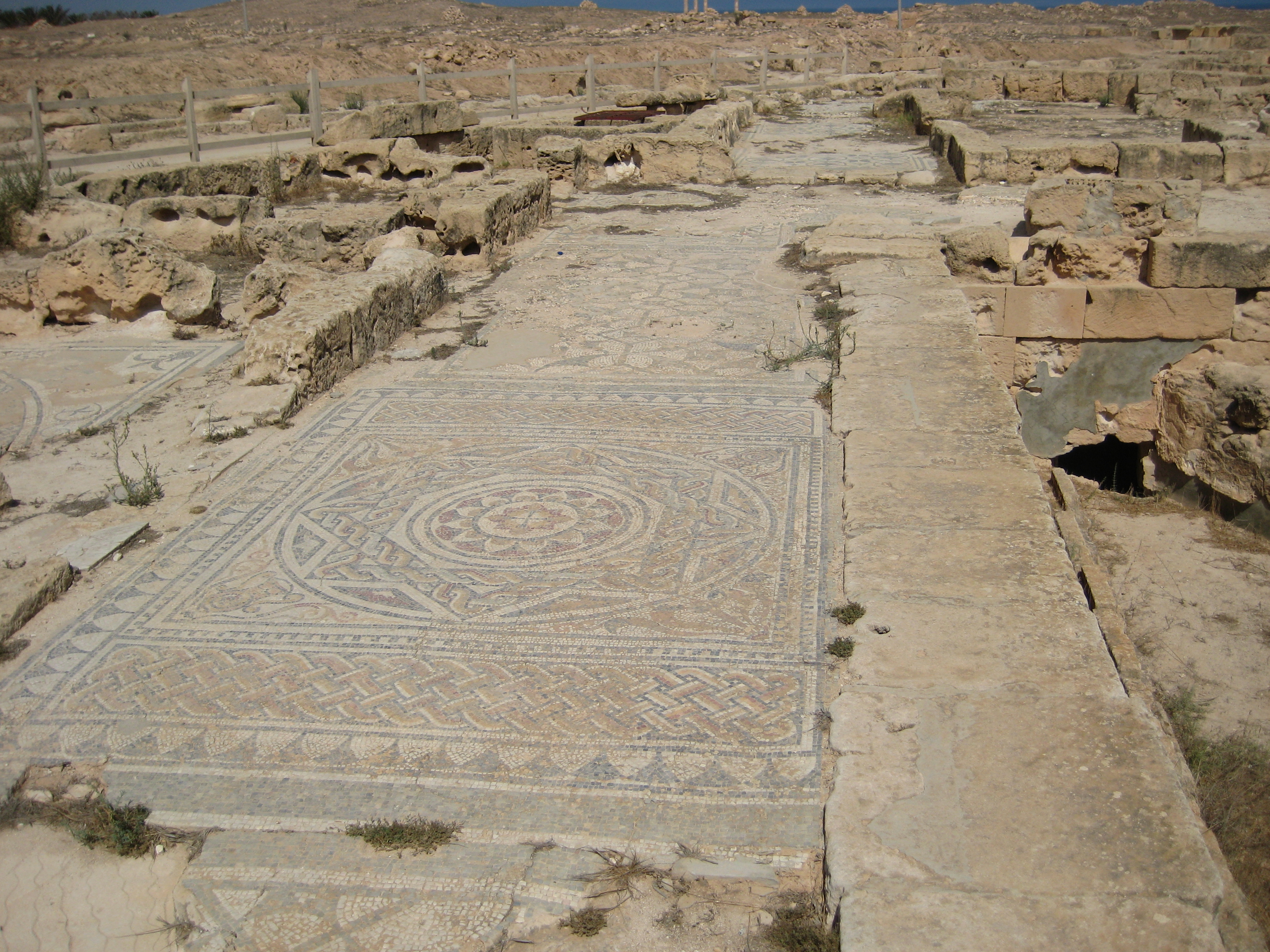
Mosaic in the Peristyle house

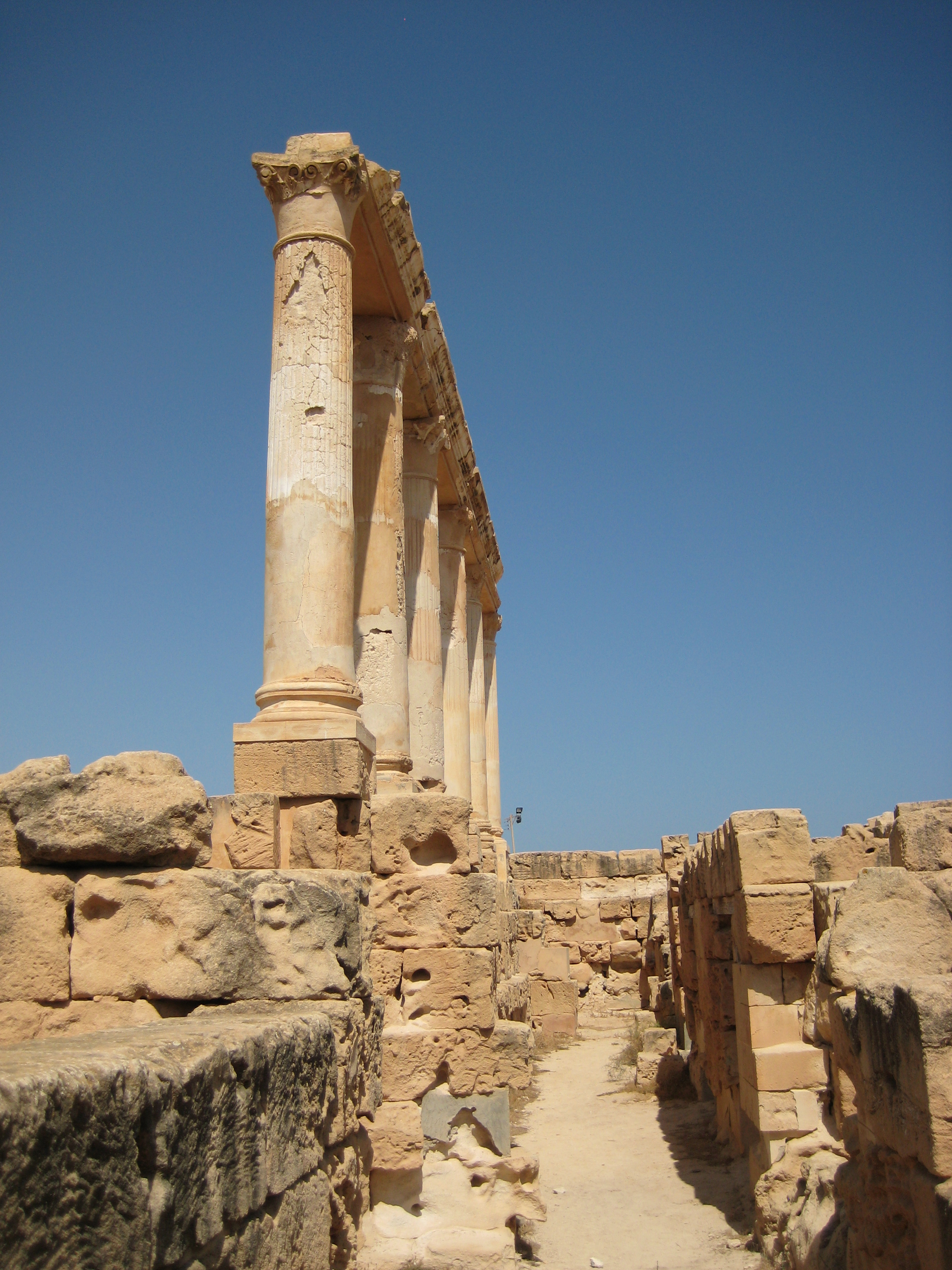
Peristyle house

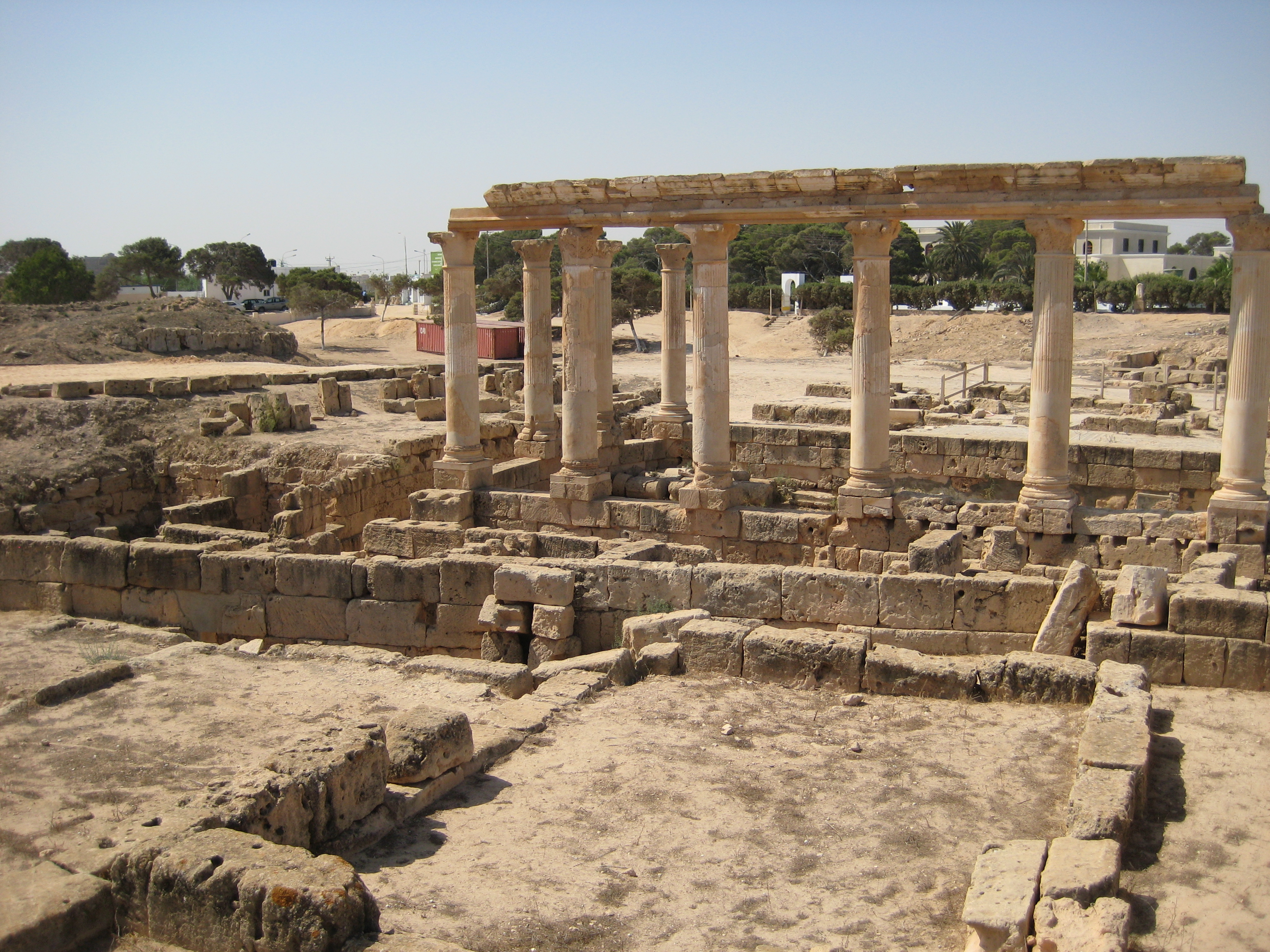
Peristyle house

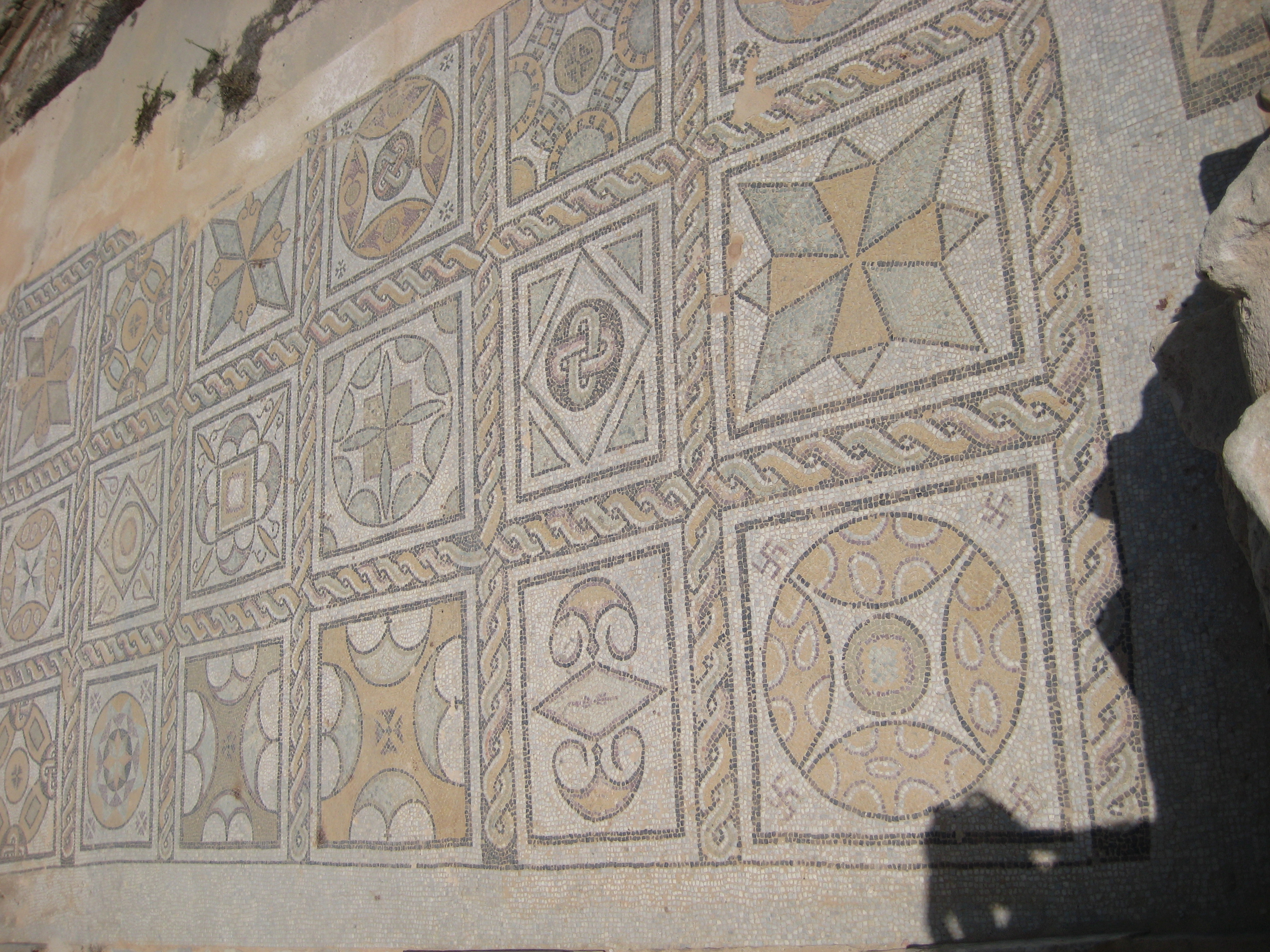
Seawards bath mosaic

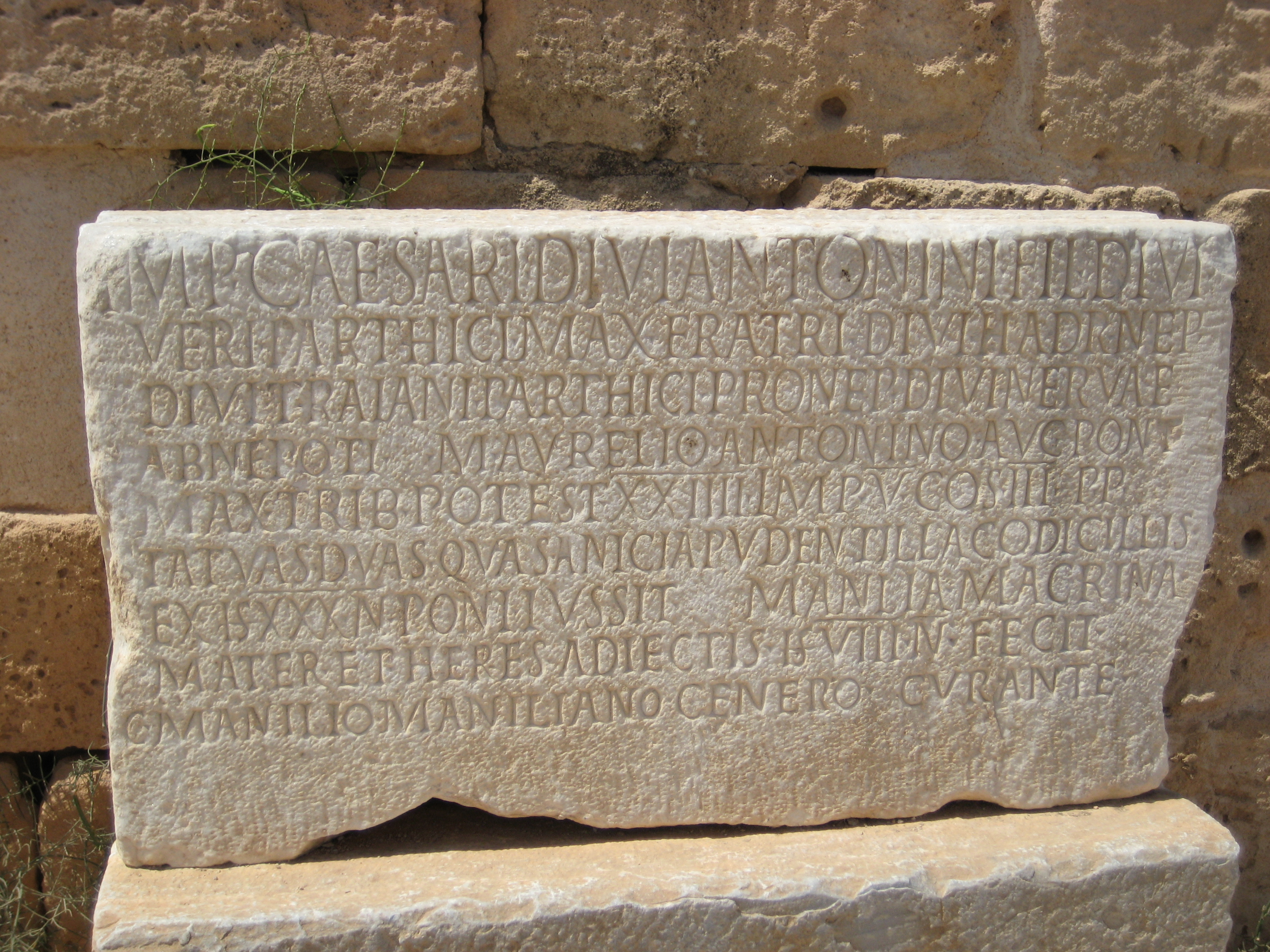
Inscription in front of the Capitolium, 2nd century BCE

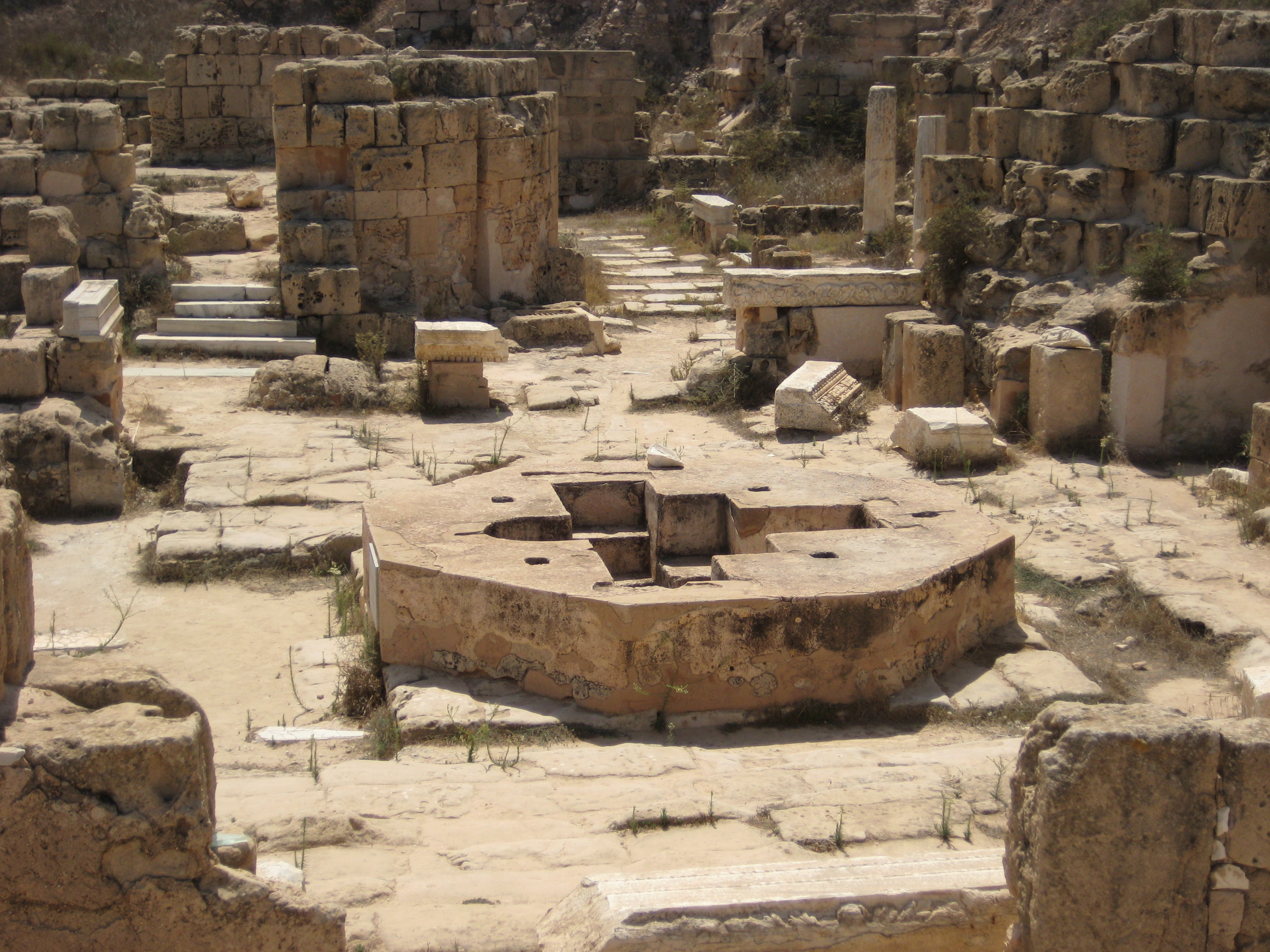
Basilica of Apuleus, Byzantine baptistery

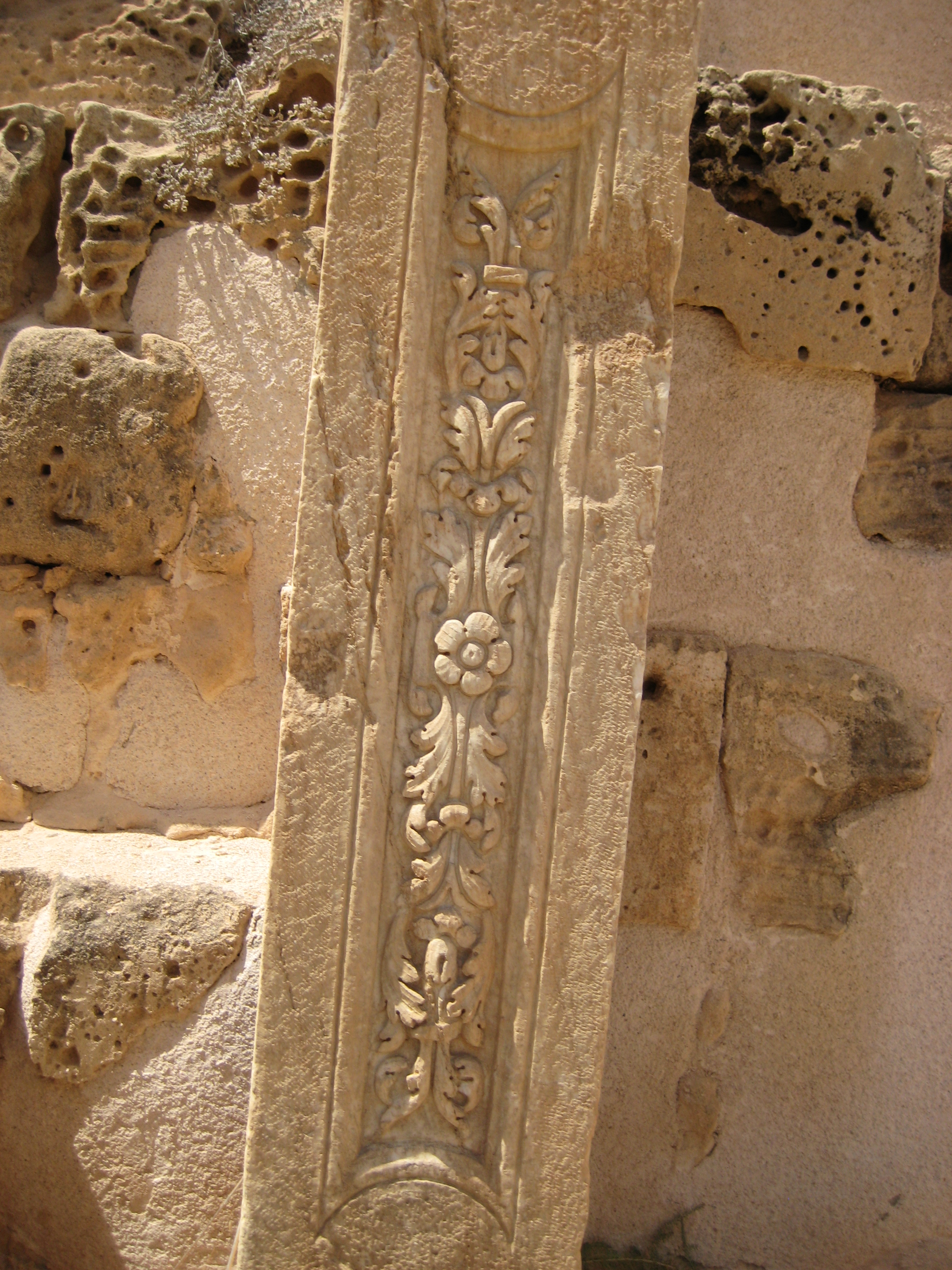
Basilica of Apuleus, Pylone

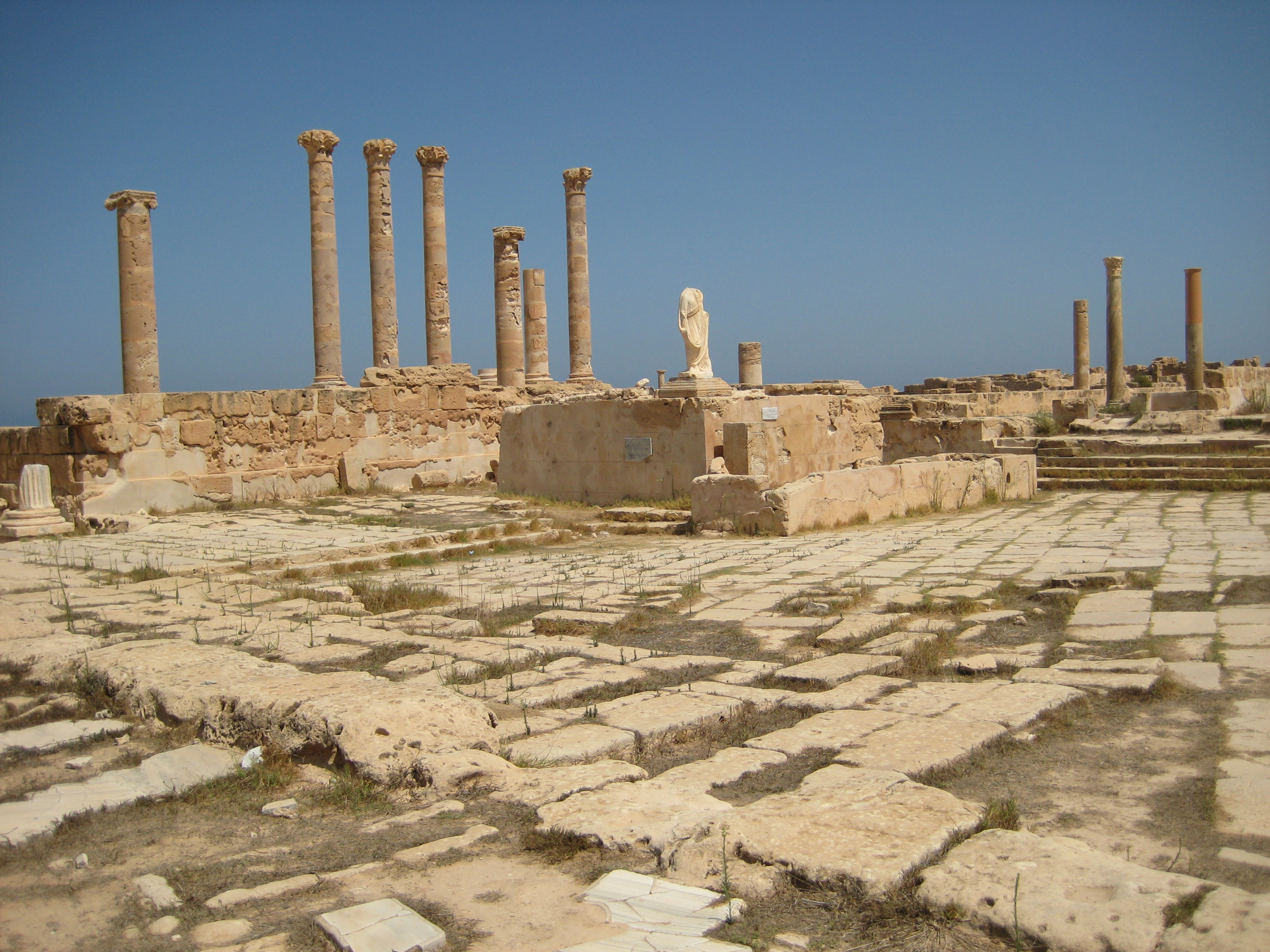
Fontain of Flavius Tullus at the Antonine Temple

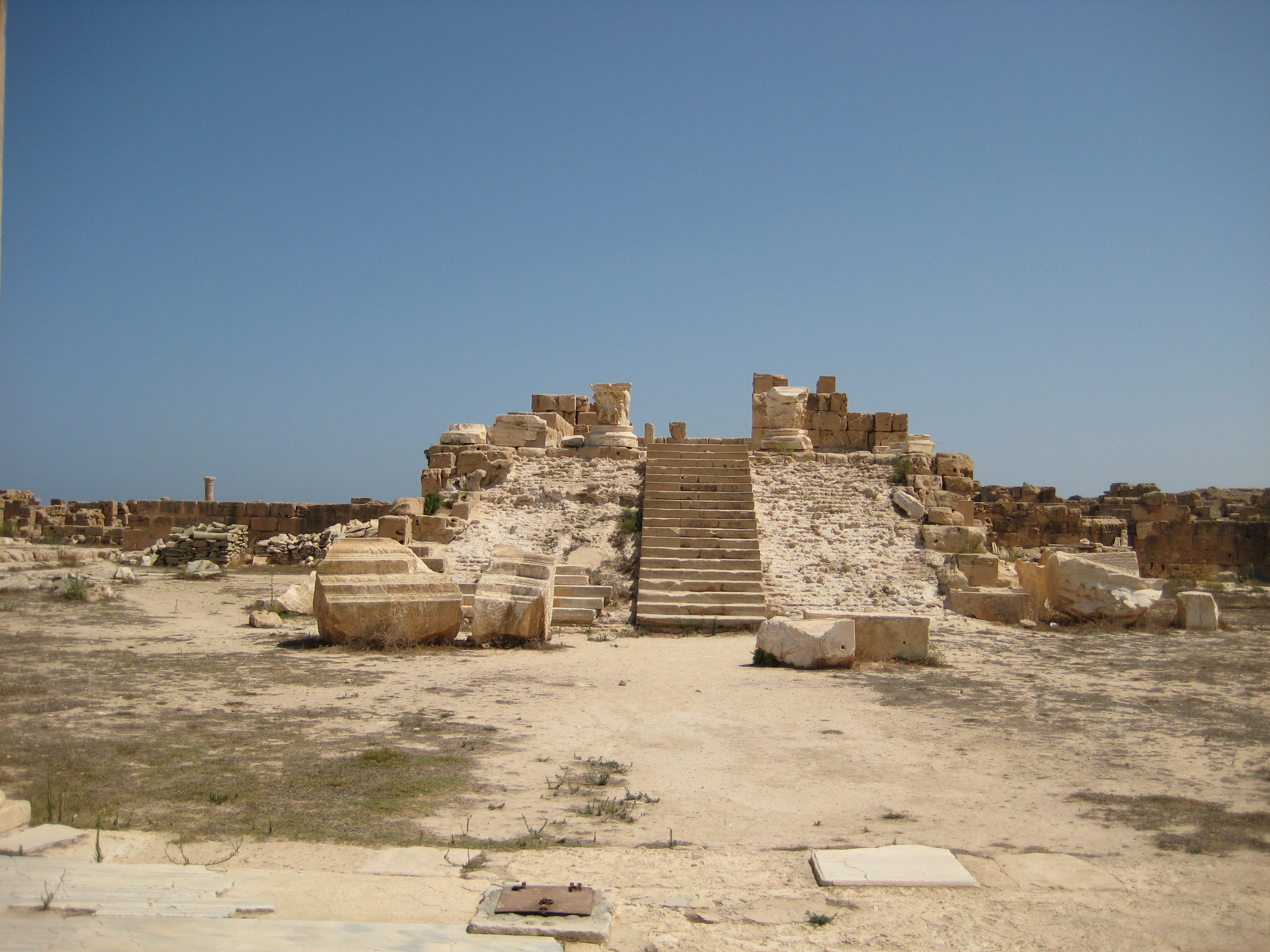
Podium at the Antonine Temple

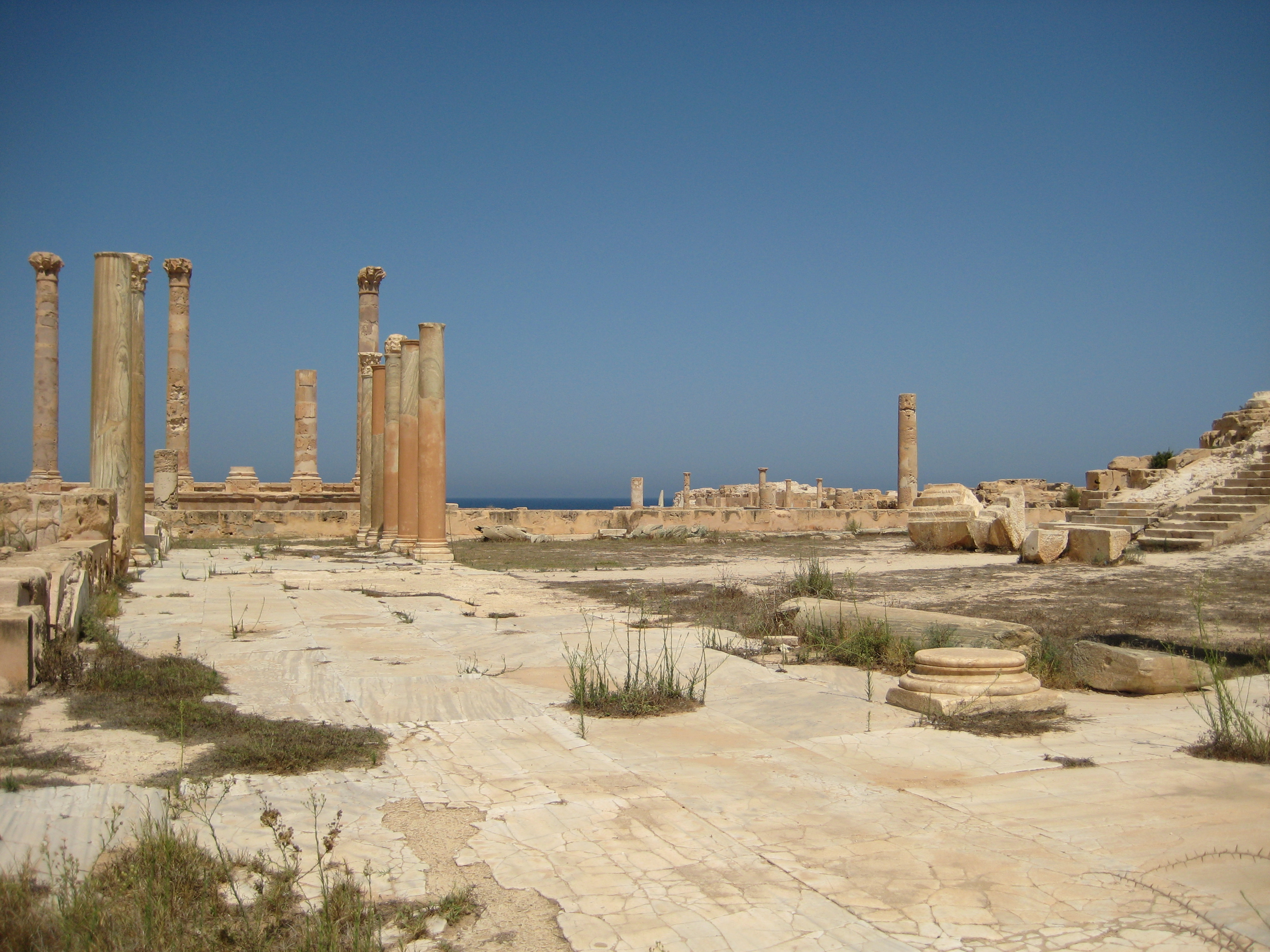
Antonine Temple

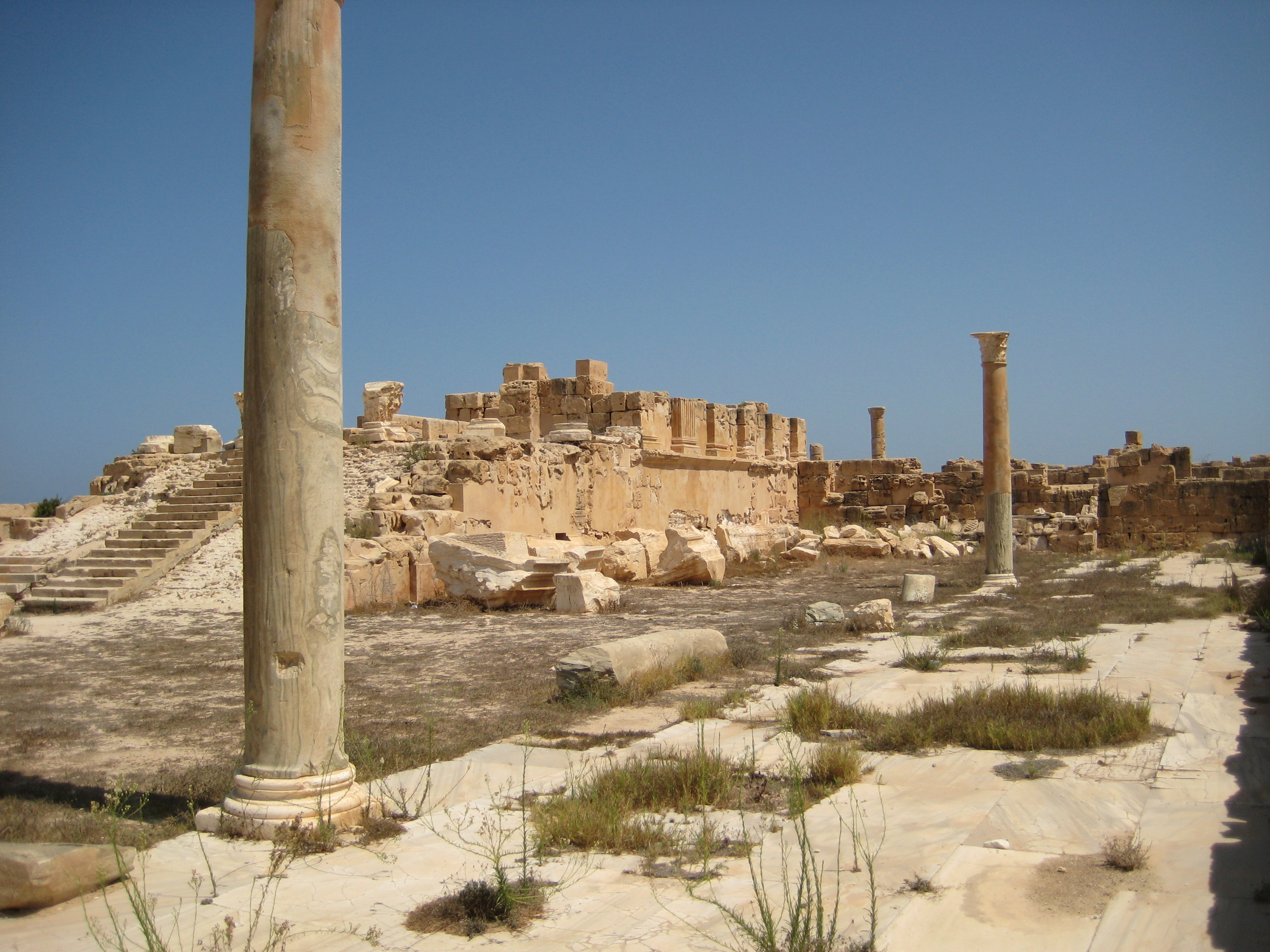
Podium at the Antonine Temple

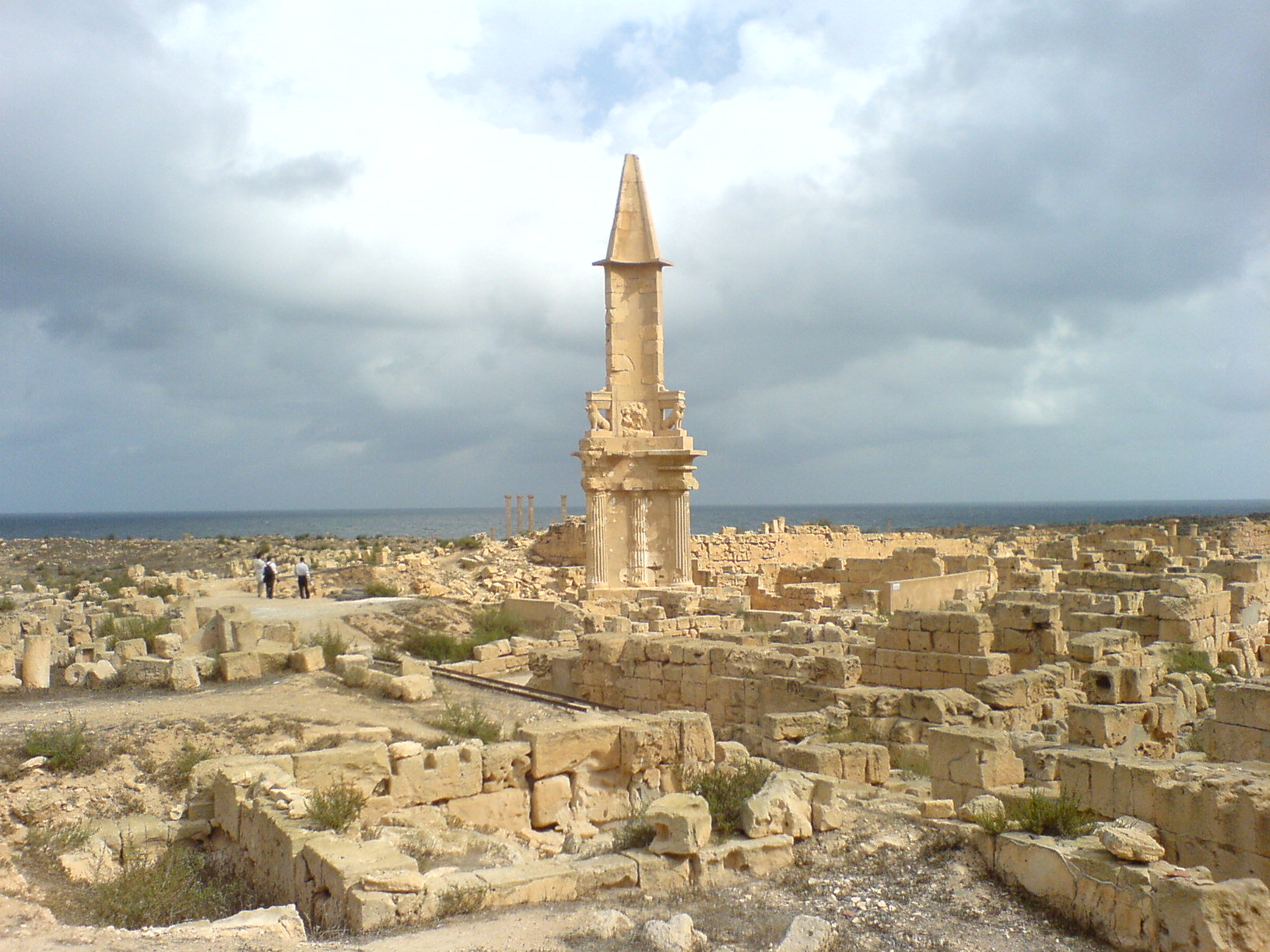
Mausoleum of Bes, 2nd century BCE

==== The theater ====
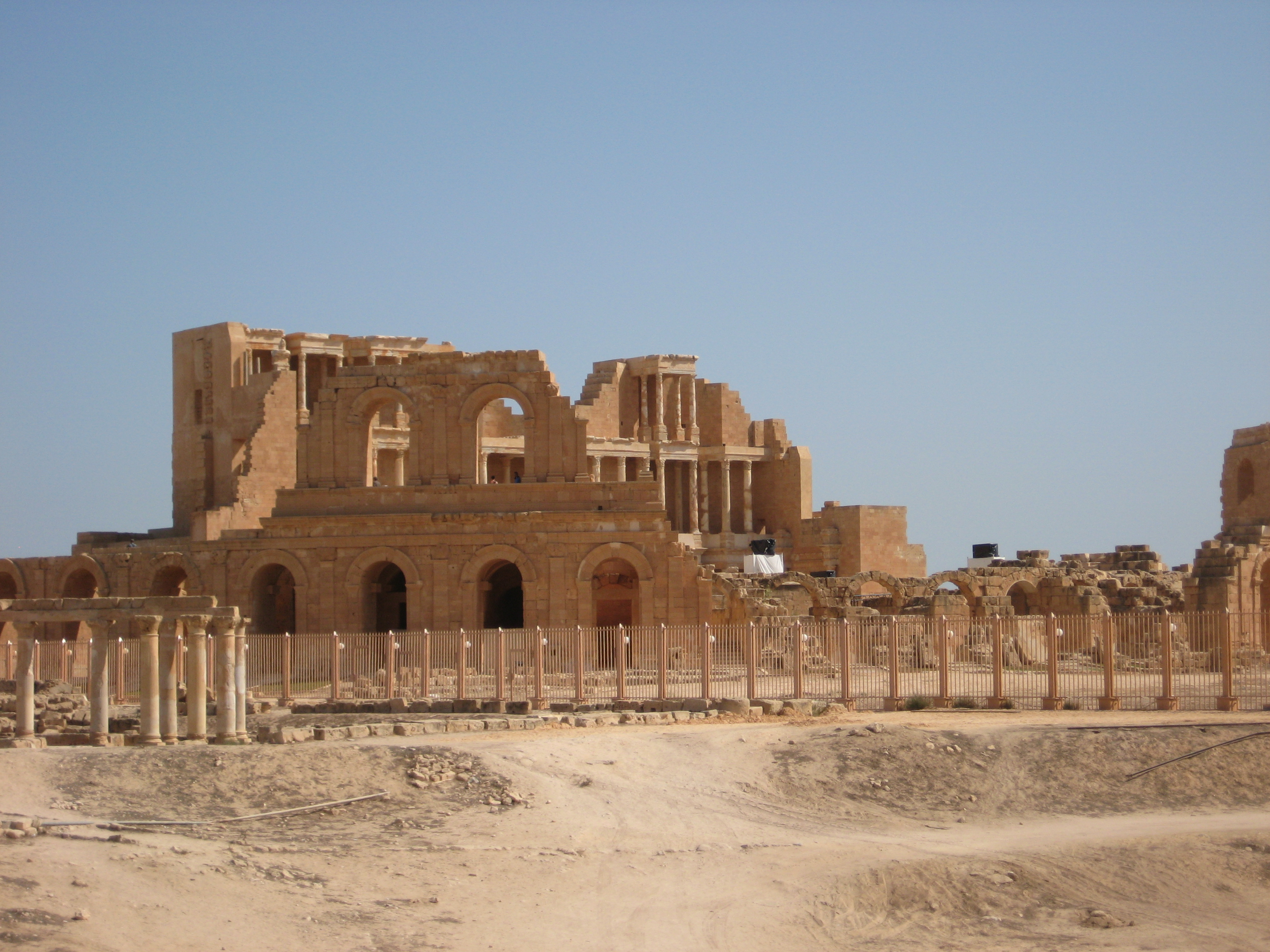
Theater in Sabratha city 2nd century CE

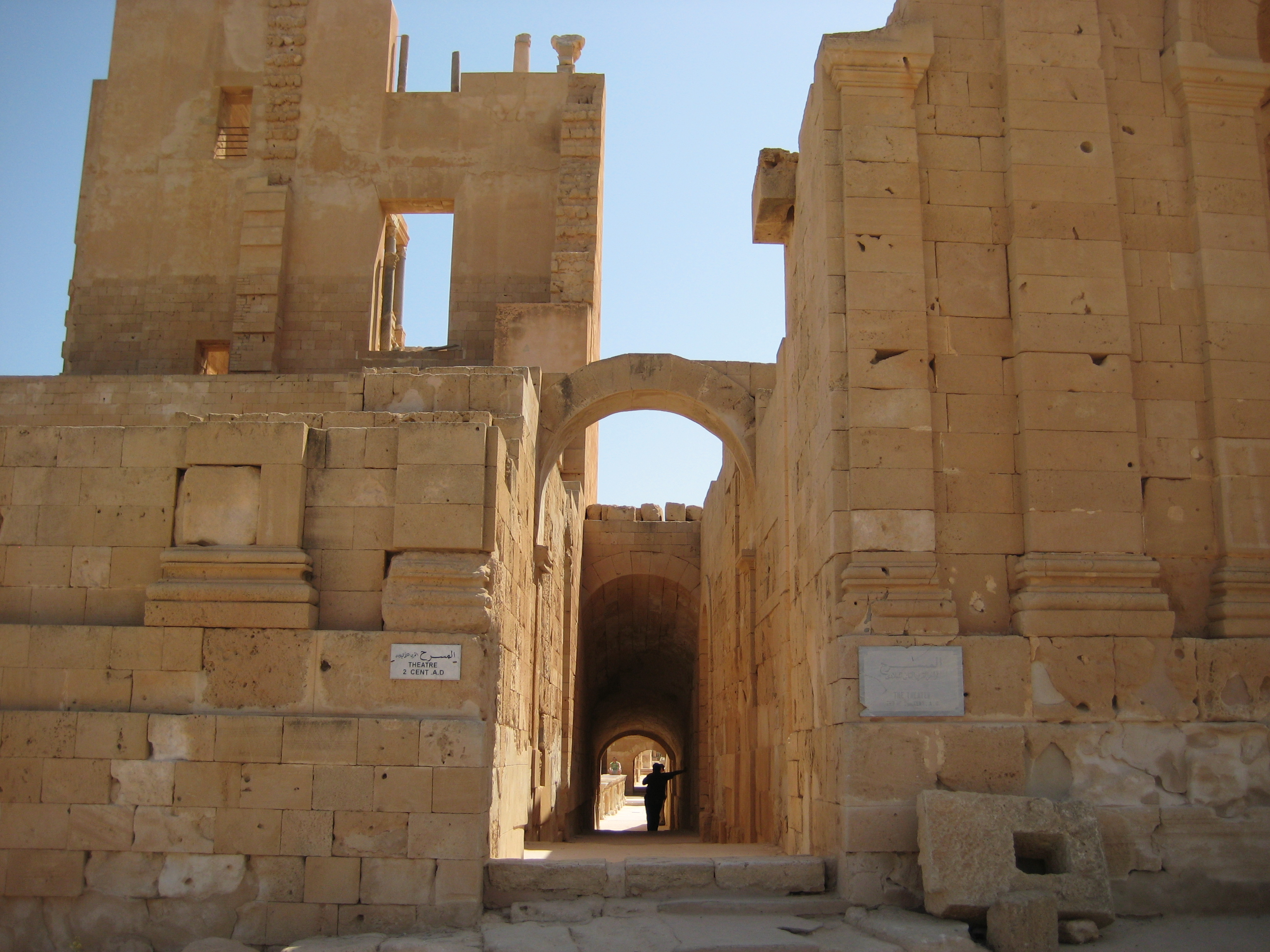
Theater

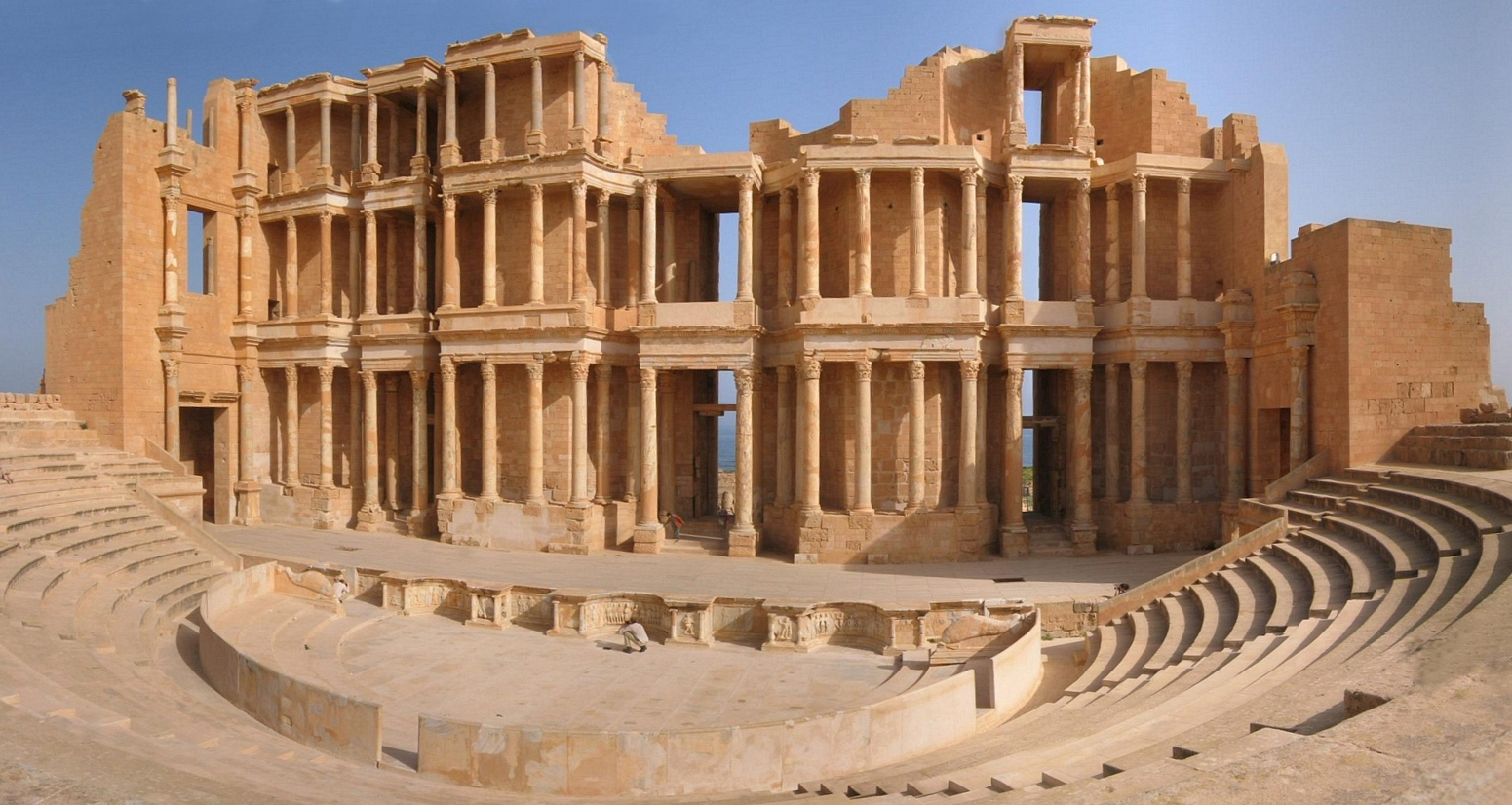
View of the Sabratha theater

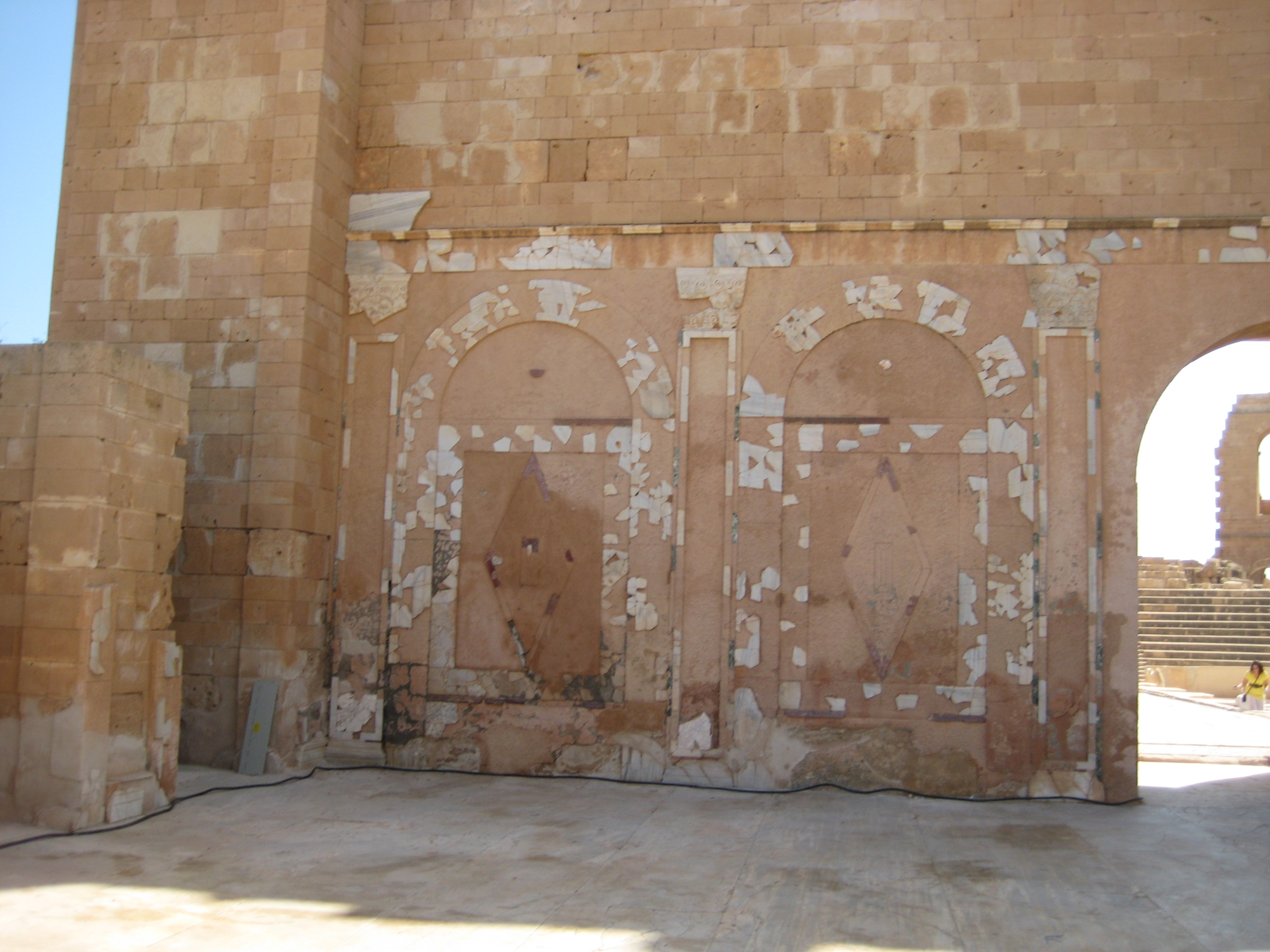
Marble facing on the wall of theater

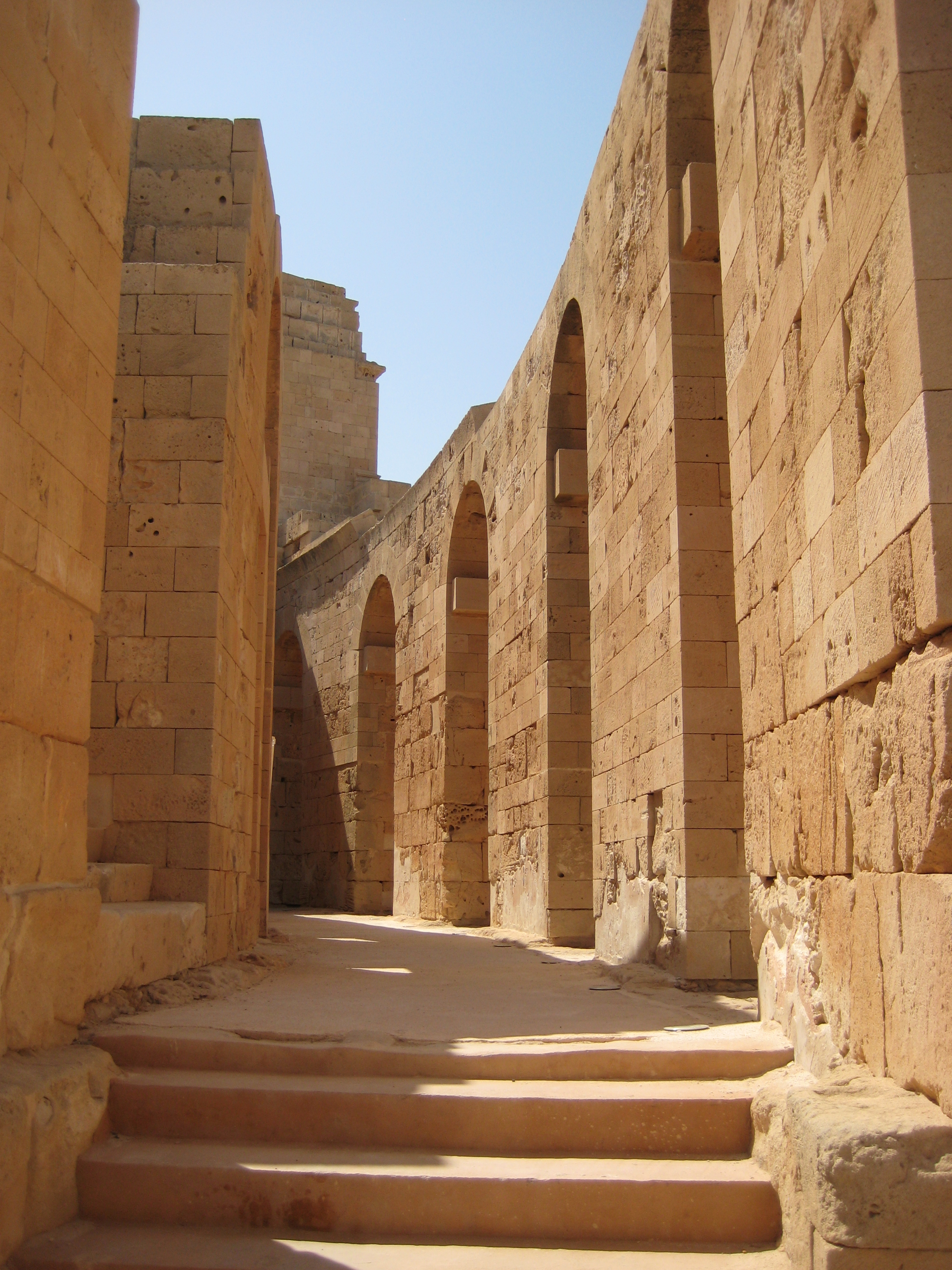
One of many ways inside of theater

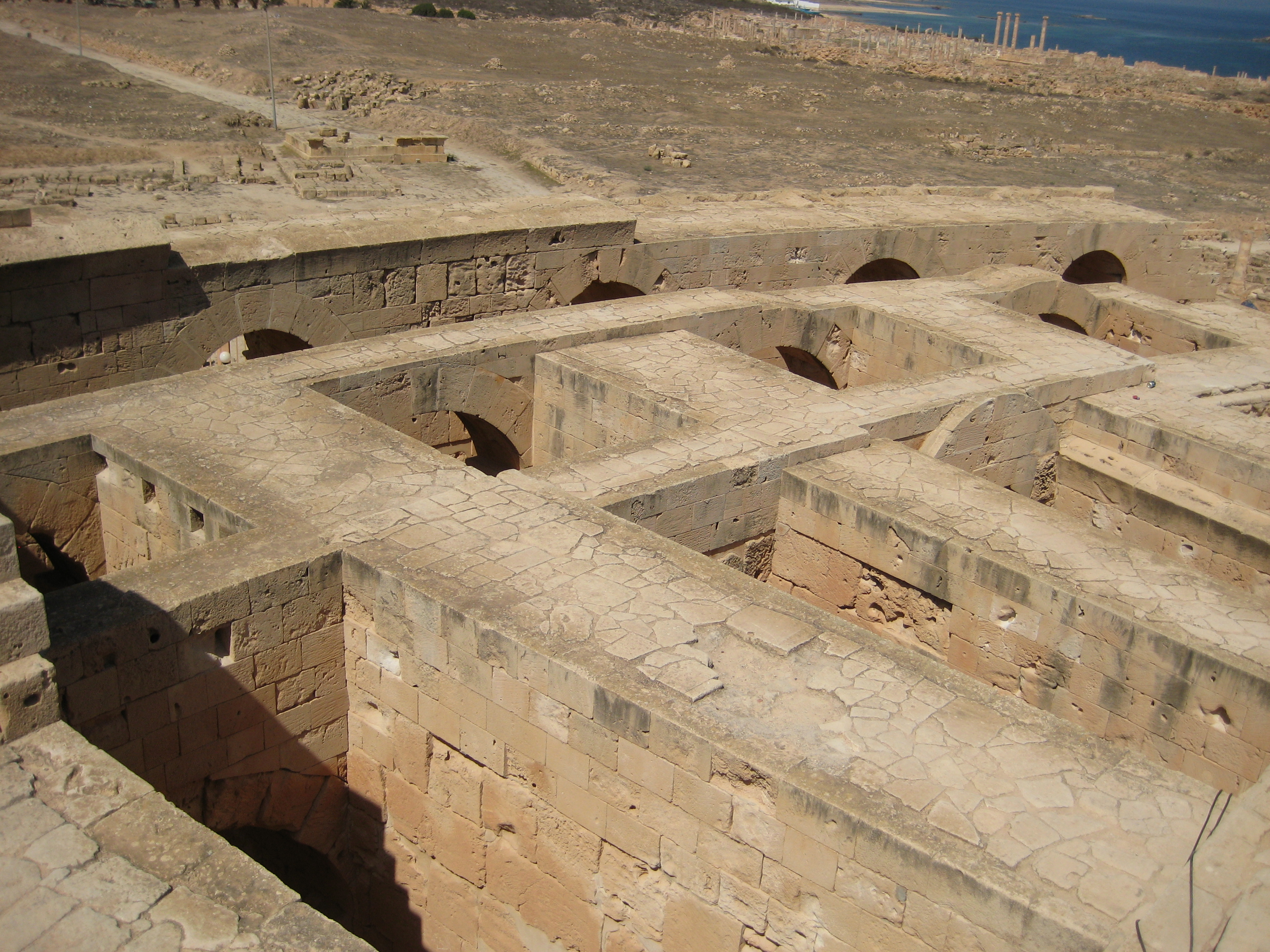
Inside ways of theater

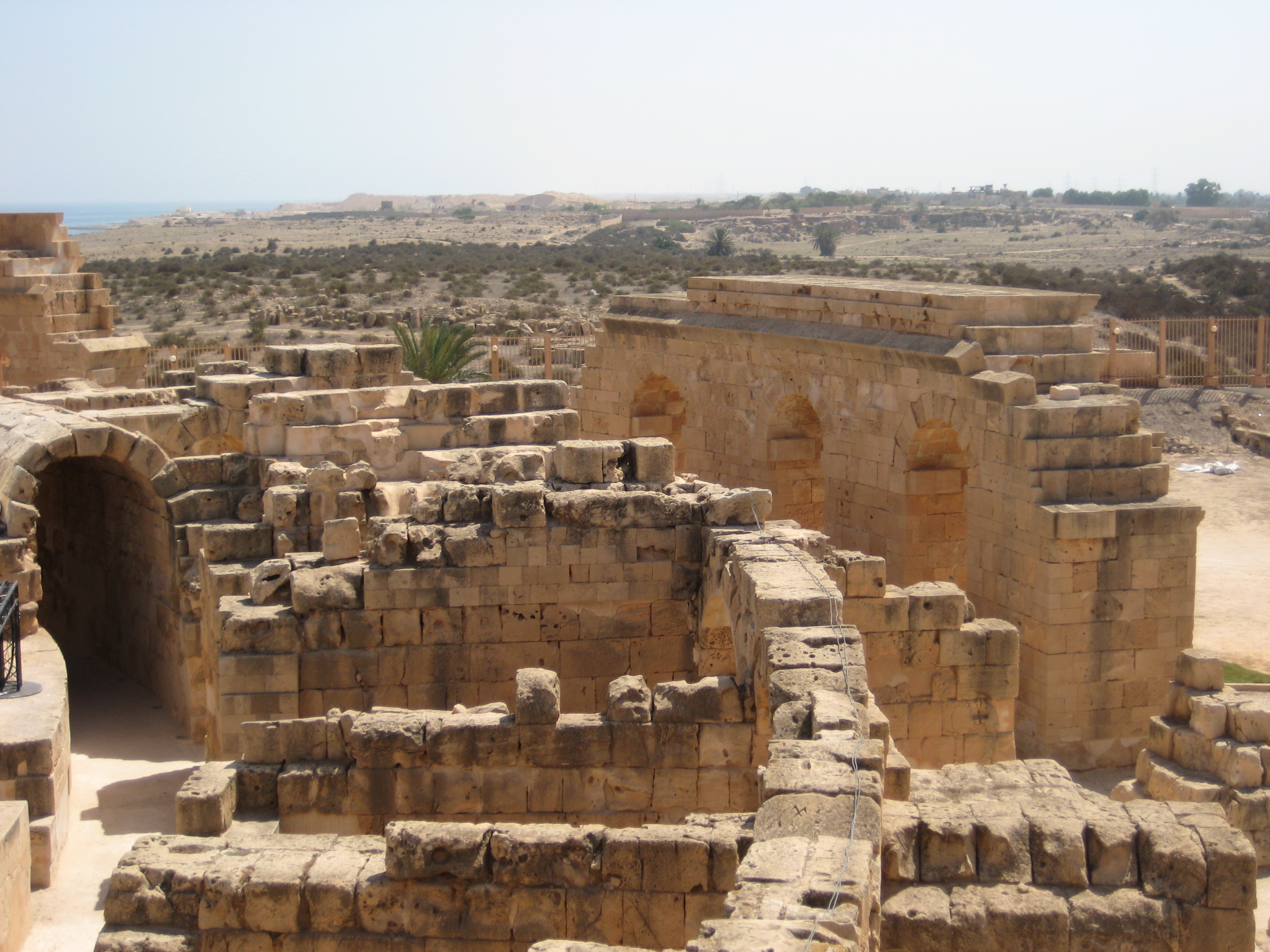
Ruins of theater

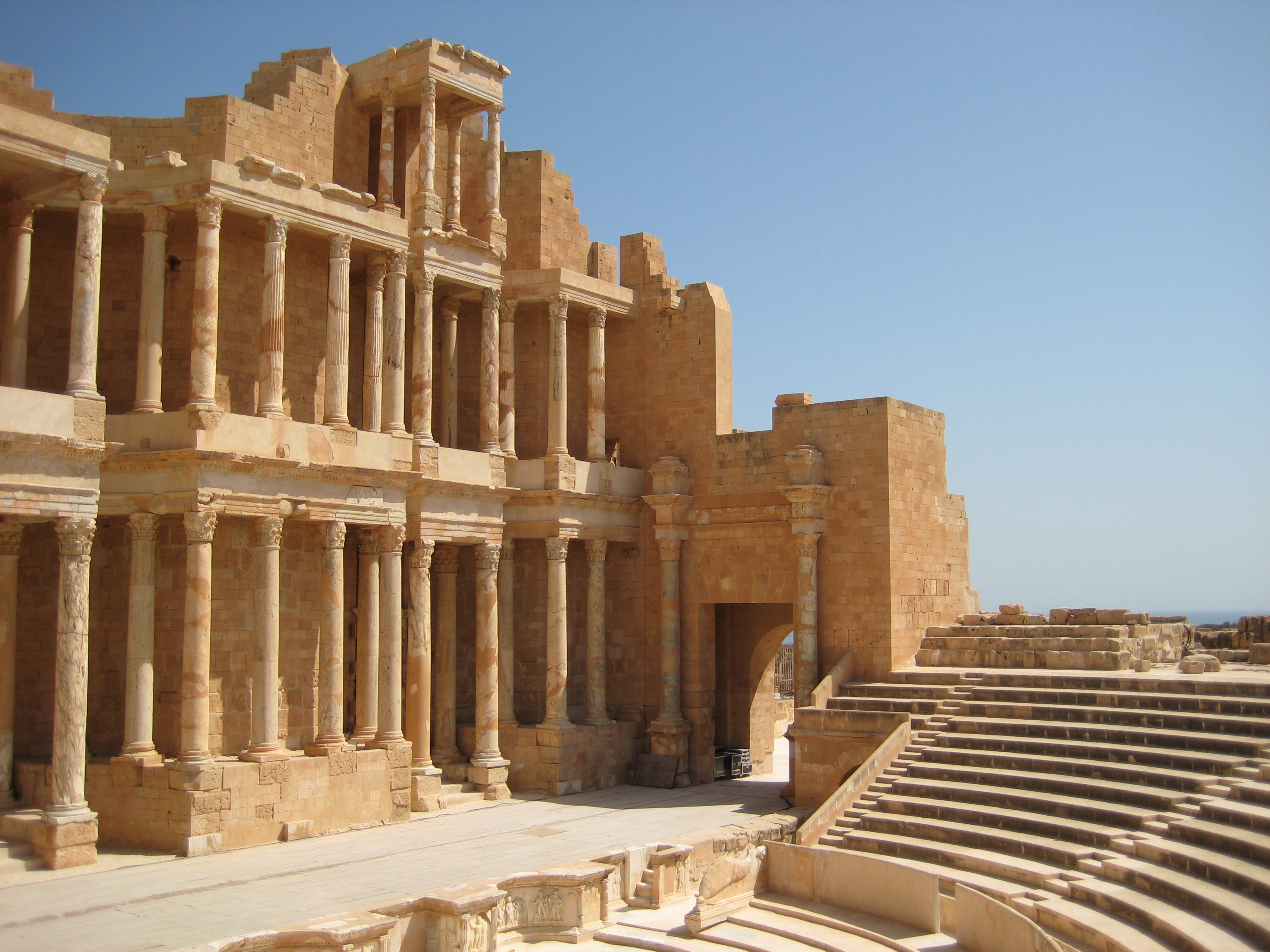
Theater

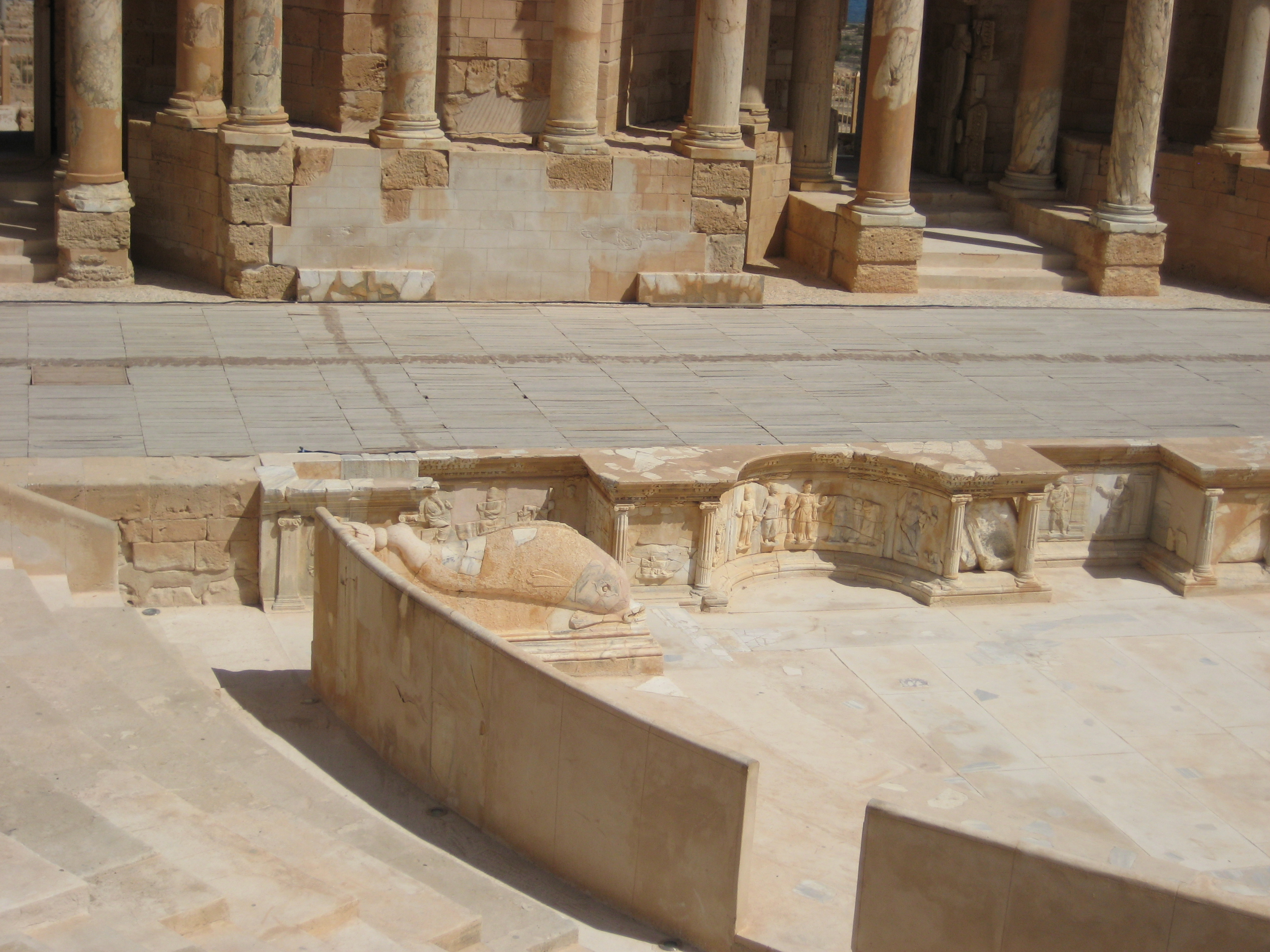
Theater

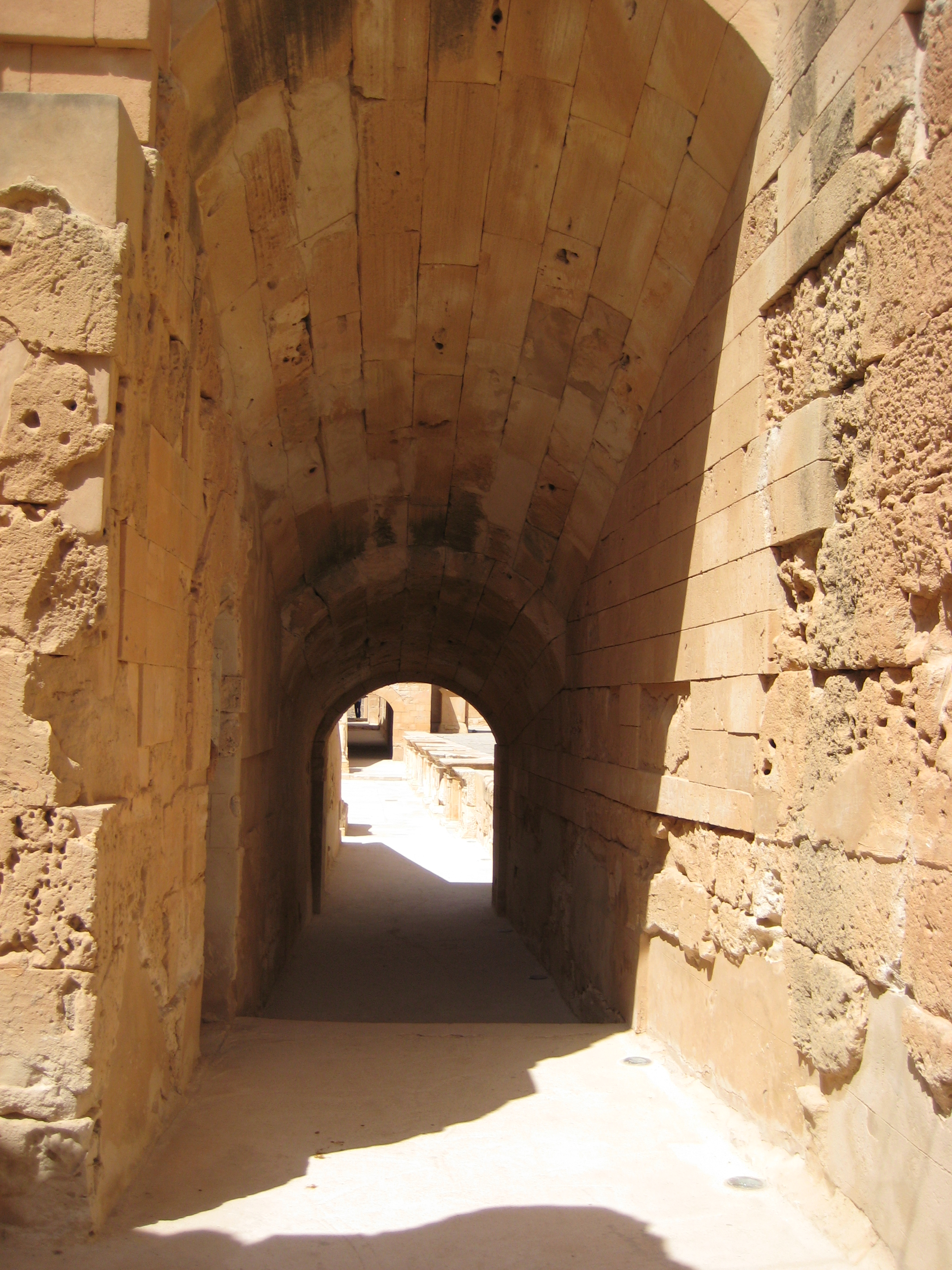
One of the few entries to theater

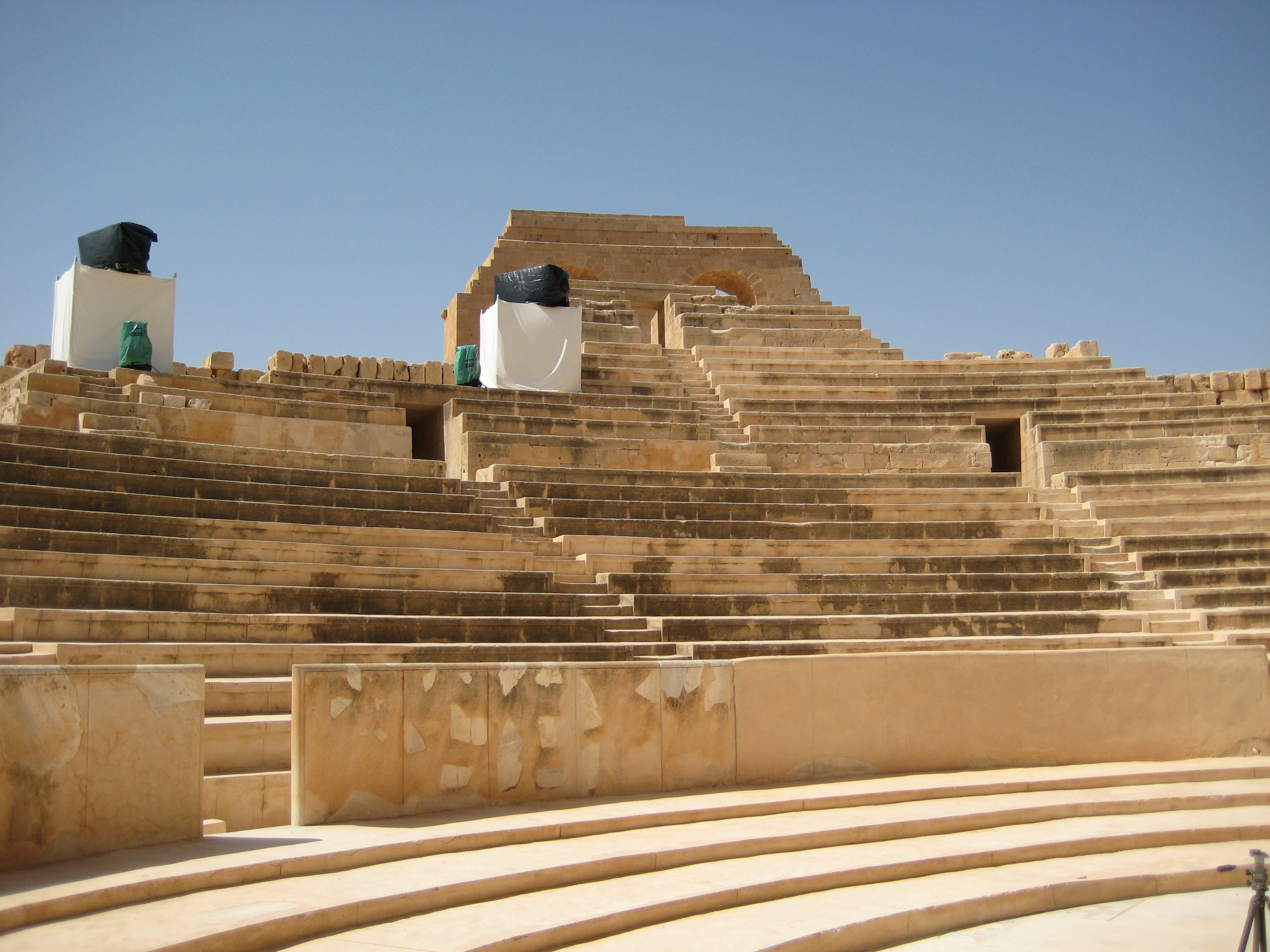
Theater

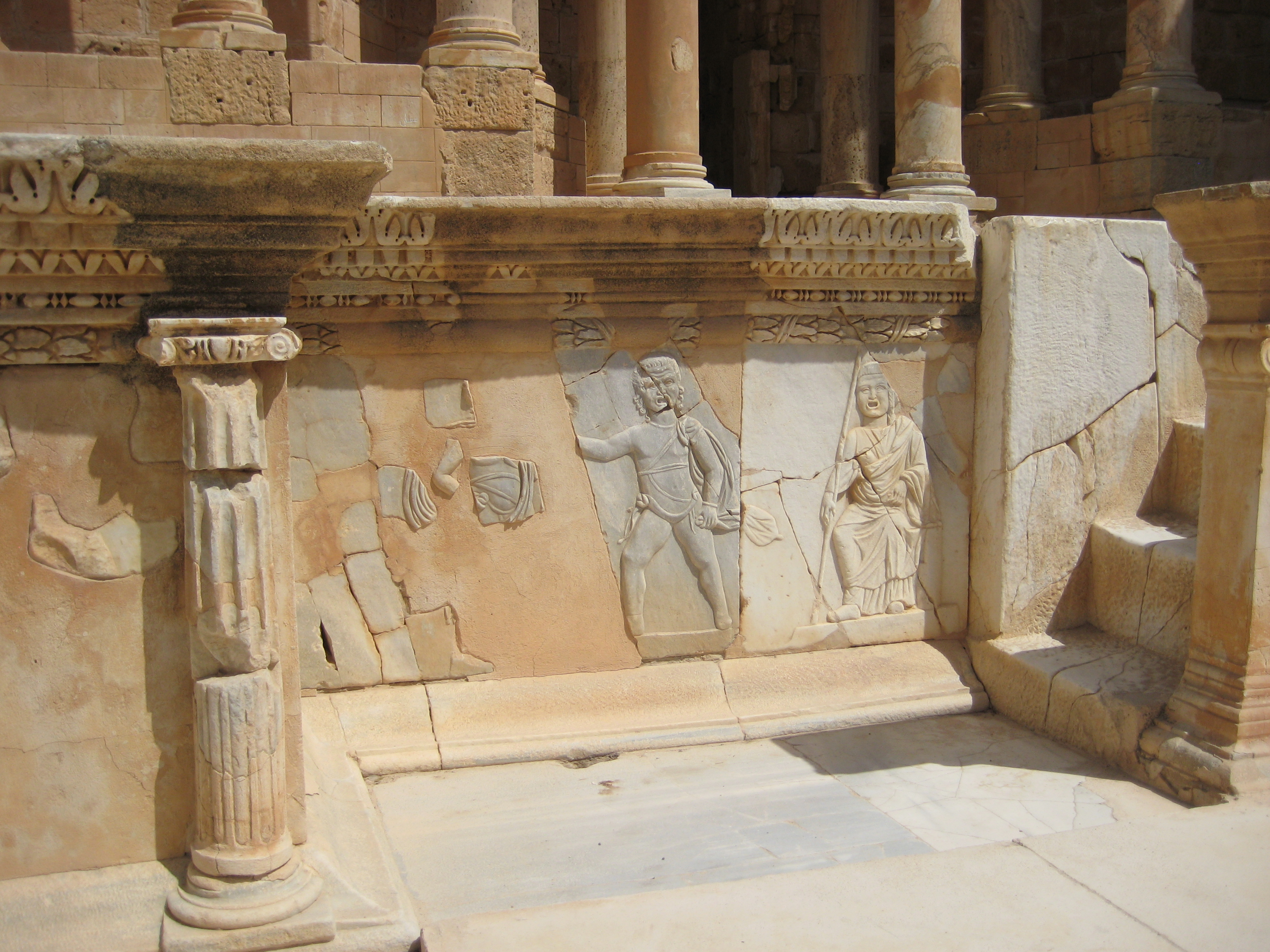
Bas-Relief (on bottom of stage), theater

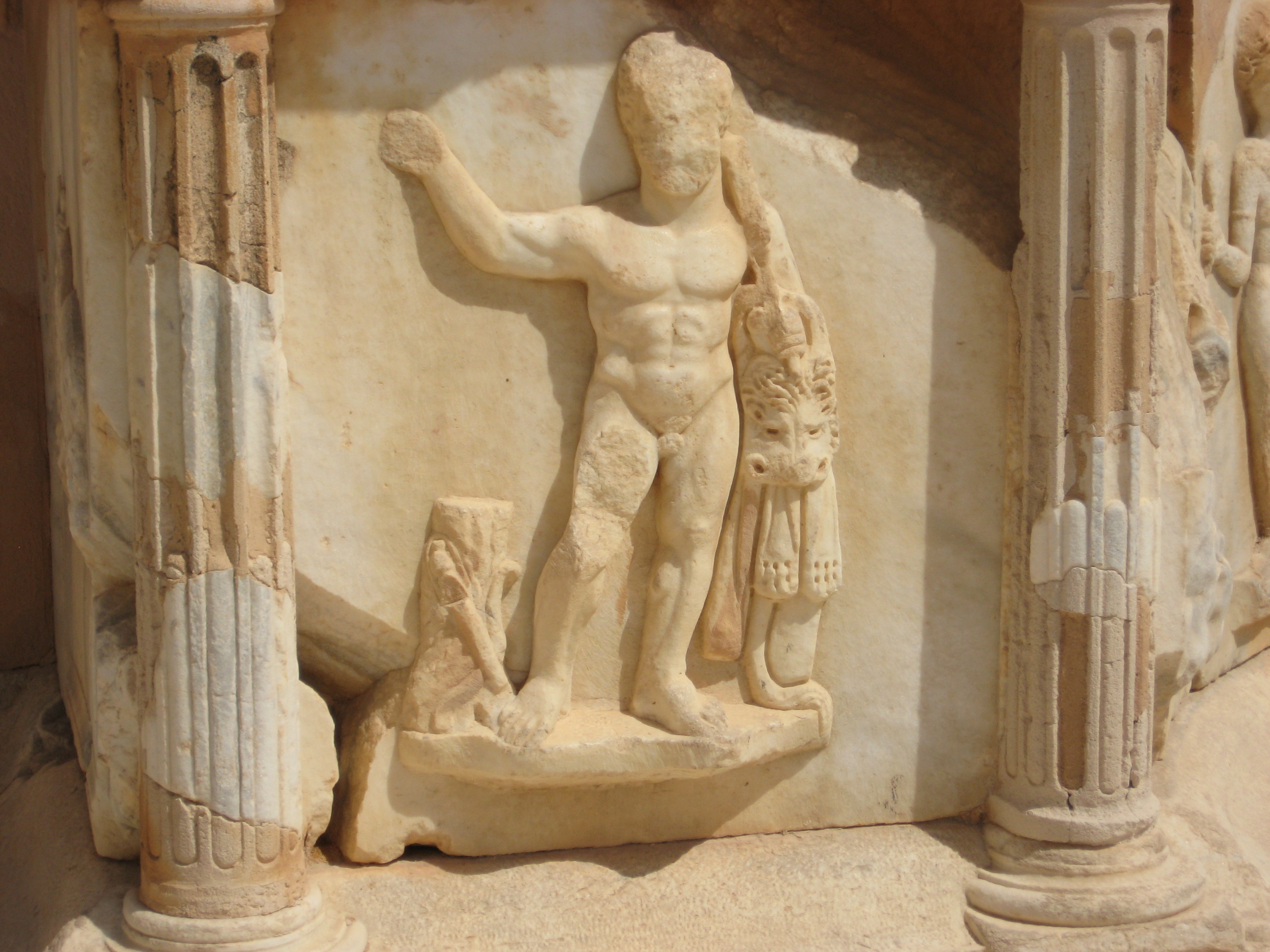
Bas-Relief (on bottom of stage), theater

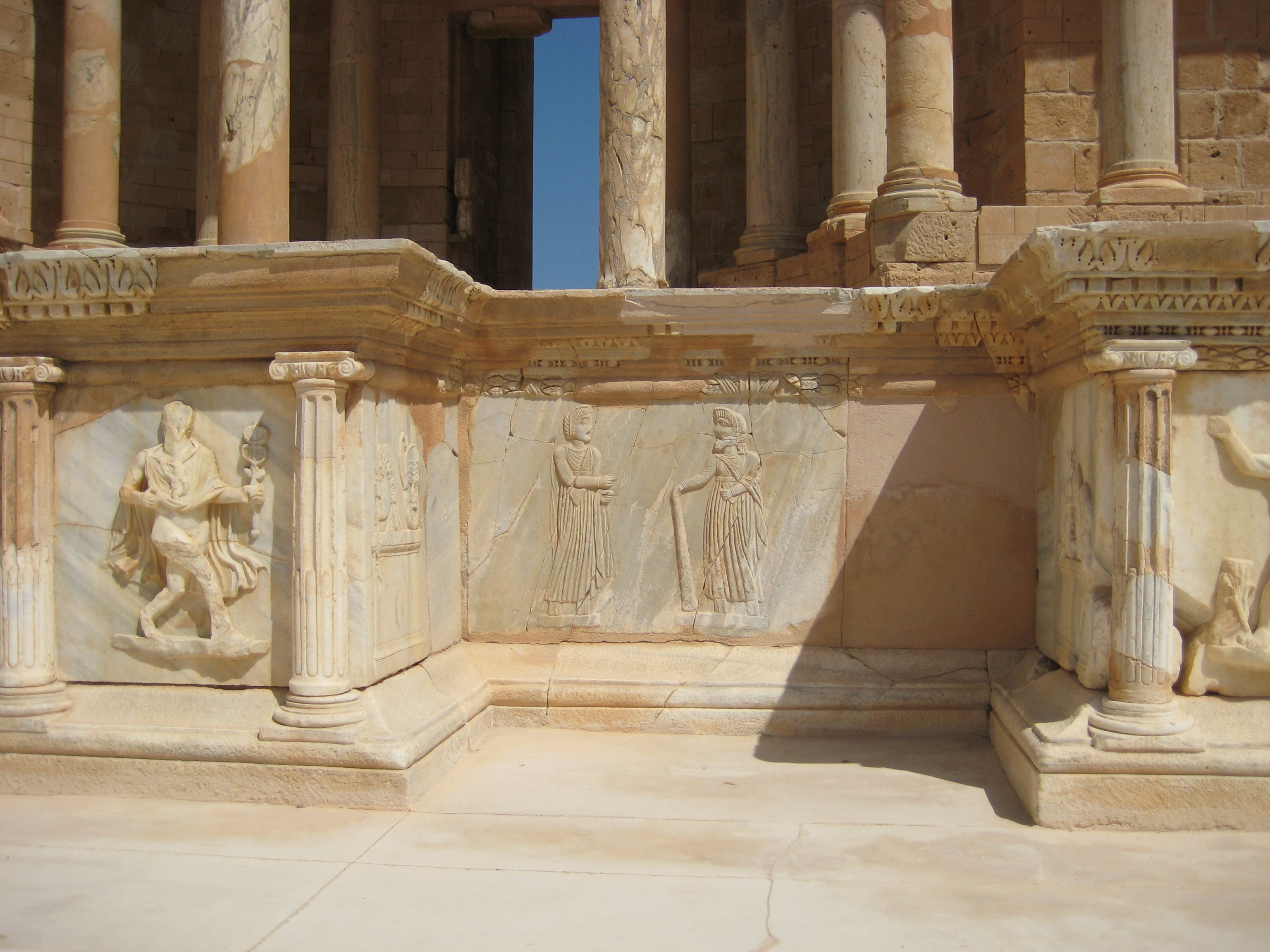
Bas-Relief (on bottom of stage), theater

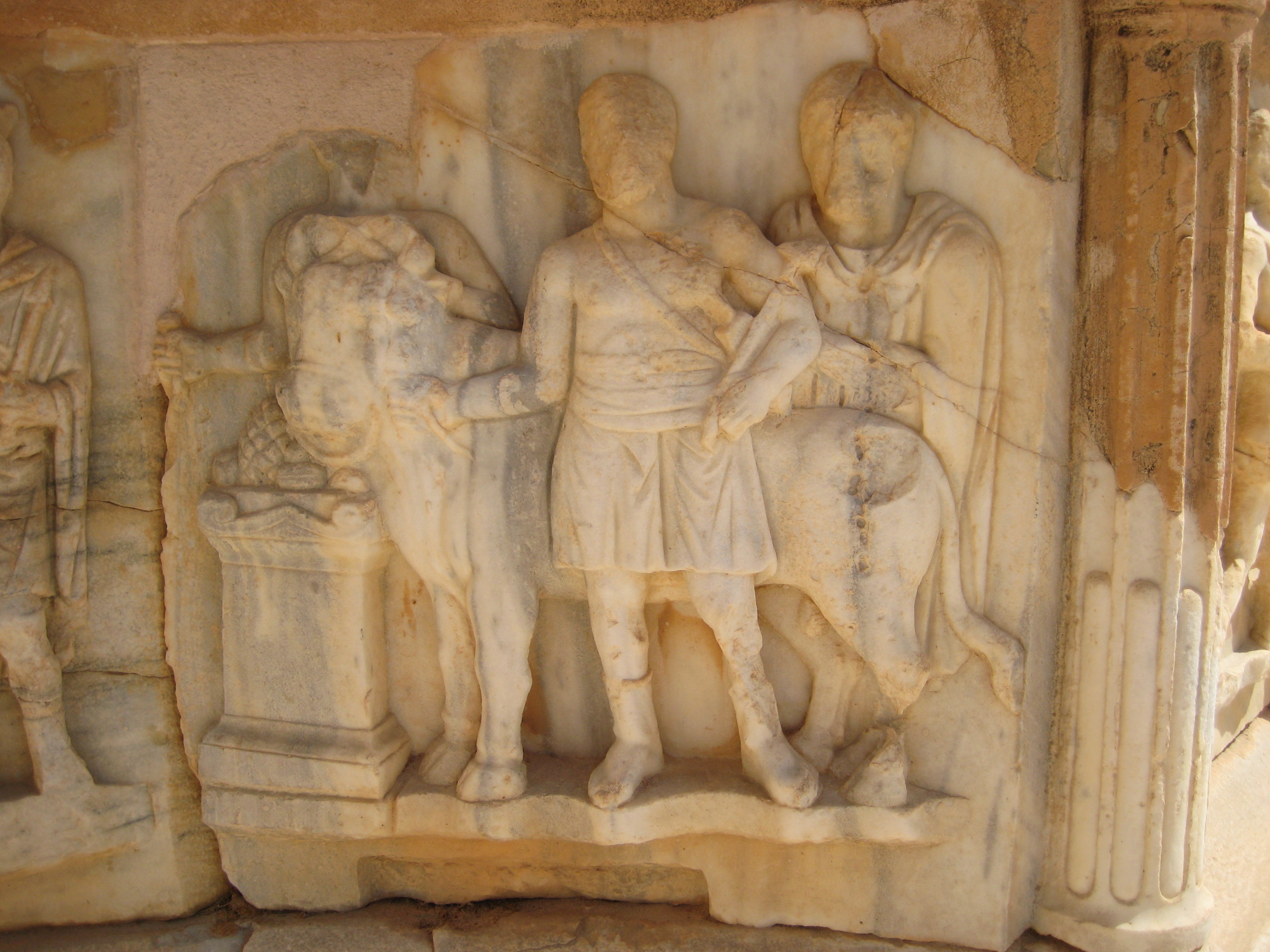
Bas-Relief (on bottom of stage), theater

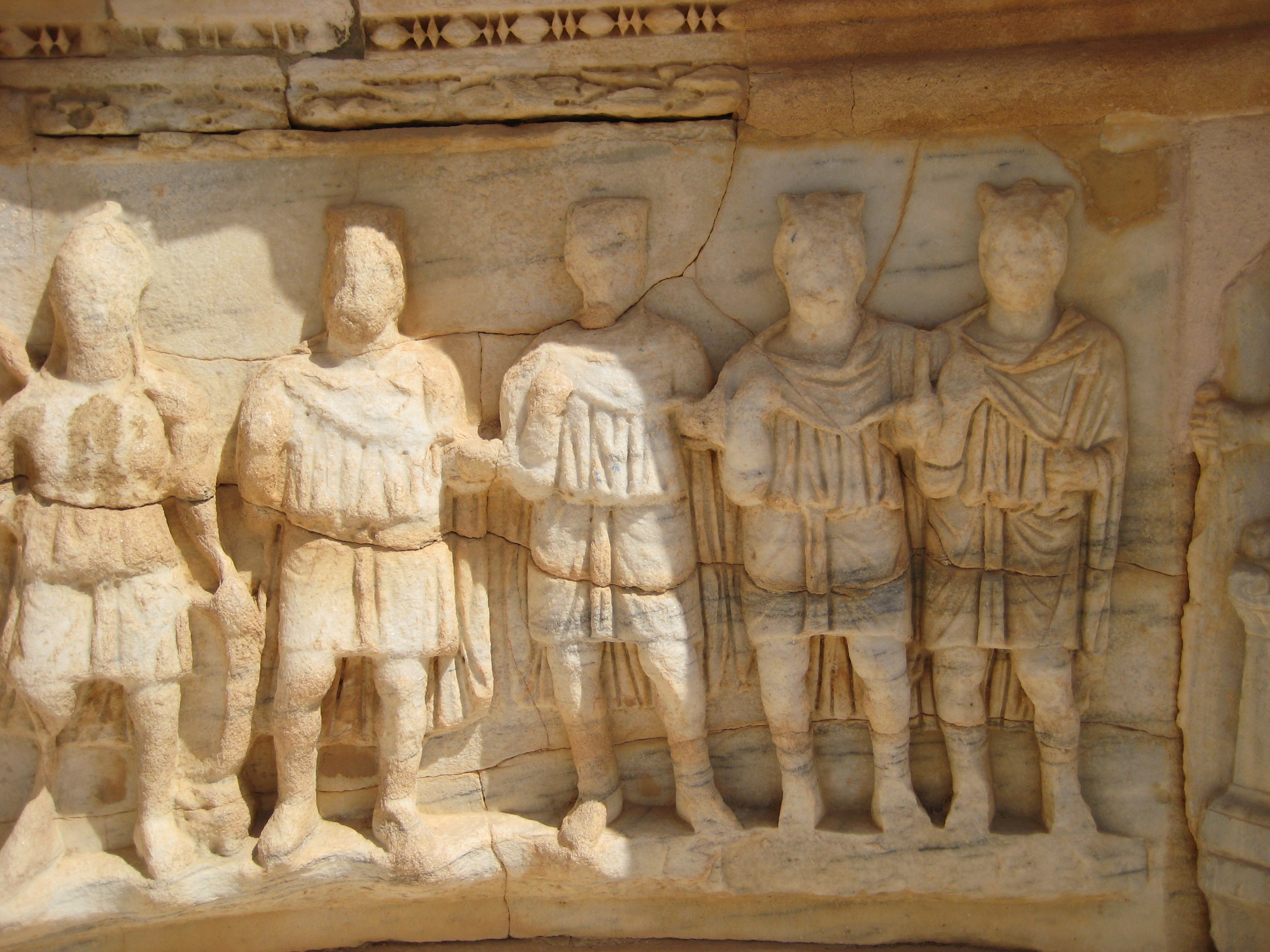
Bas-Relief (on bottom of stage), theater

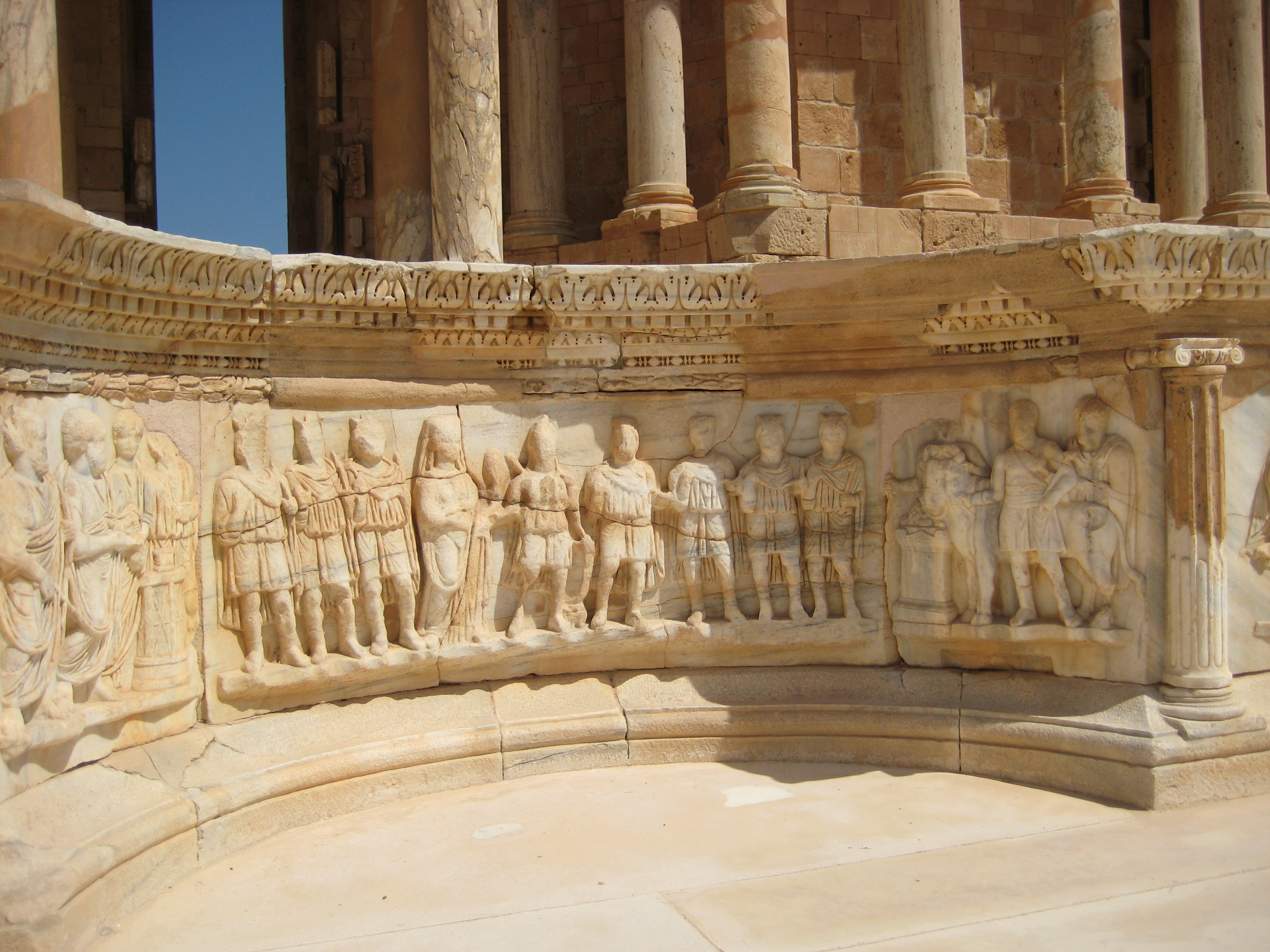
Bas-Relief (on bottom of stage), theater

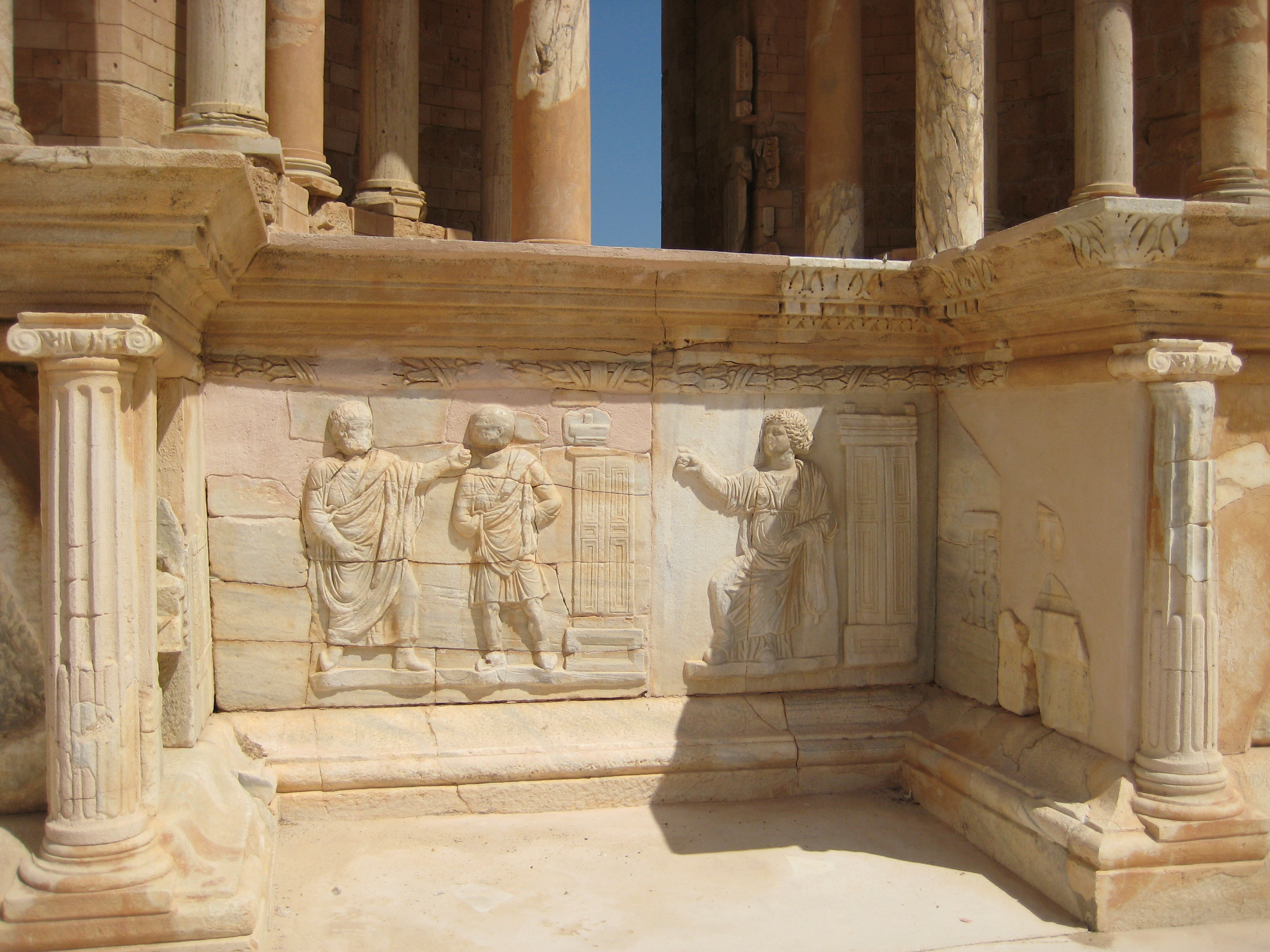
Bas-Relief (on bottom of stage), theater

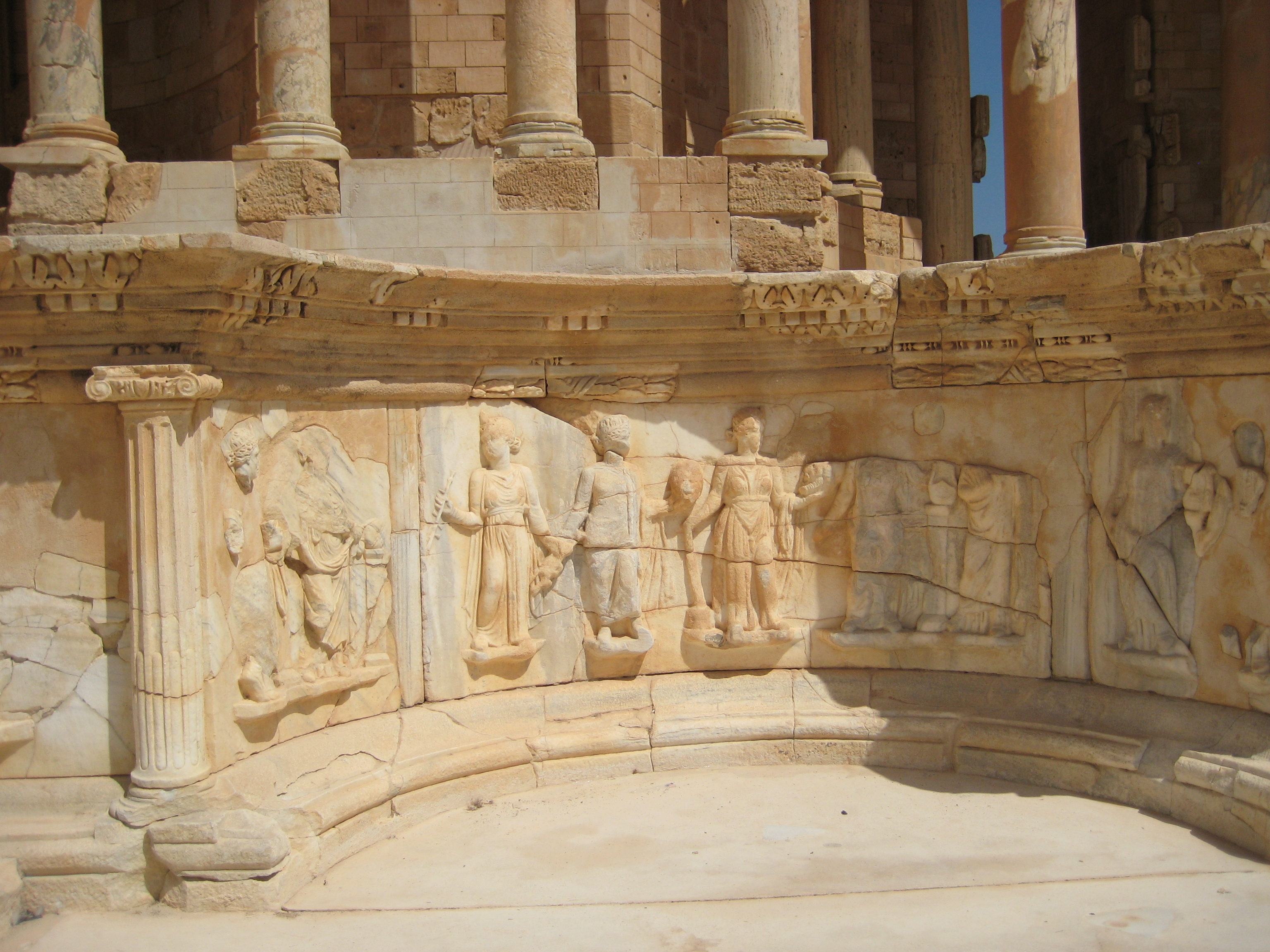
Bas-Relief (on bottom of stage), theater

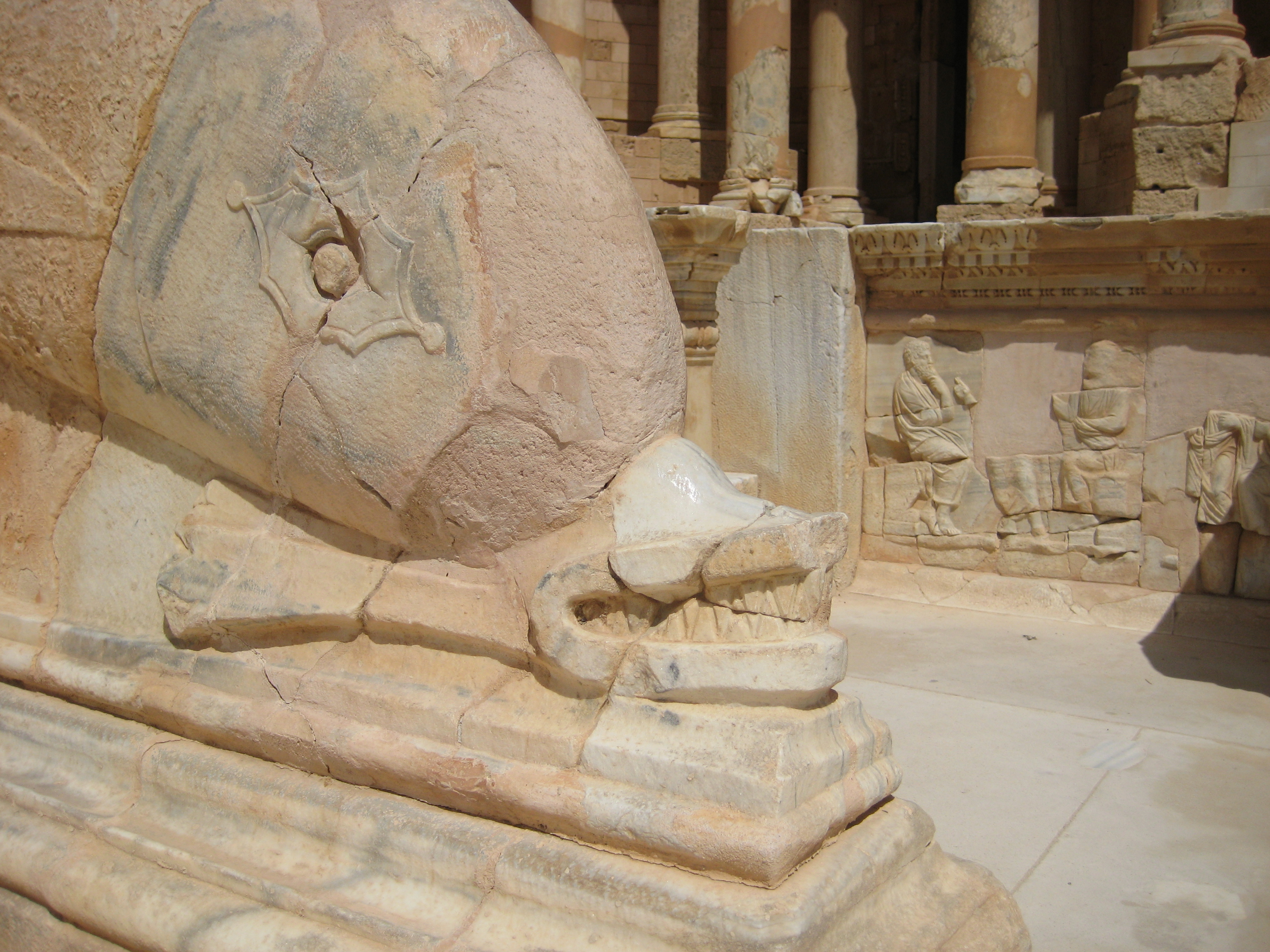
High relief, theater

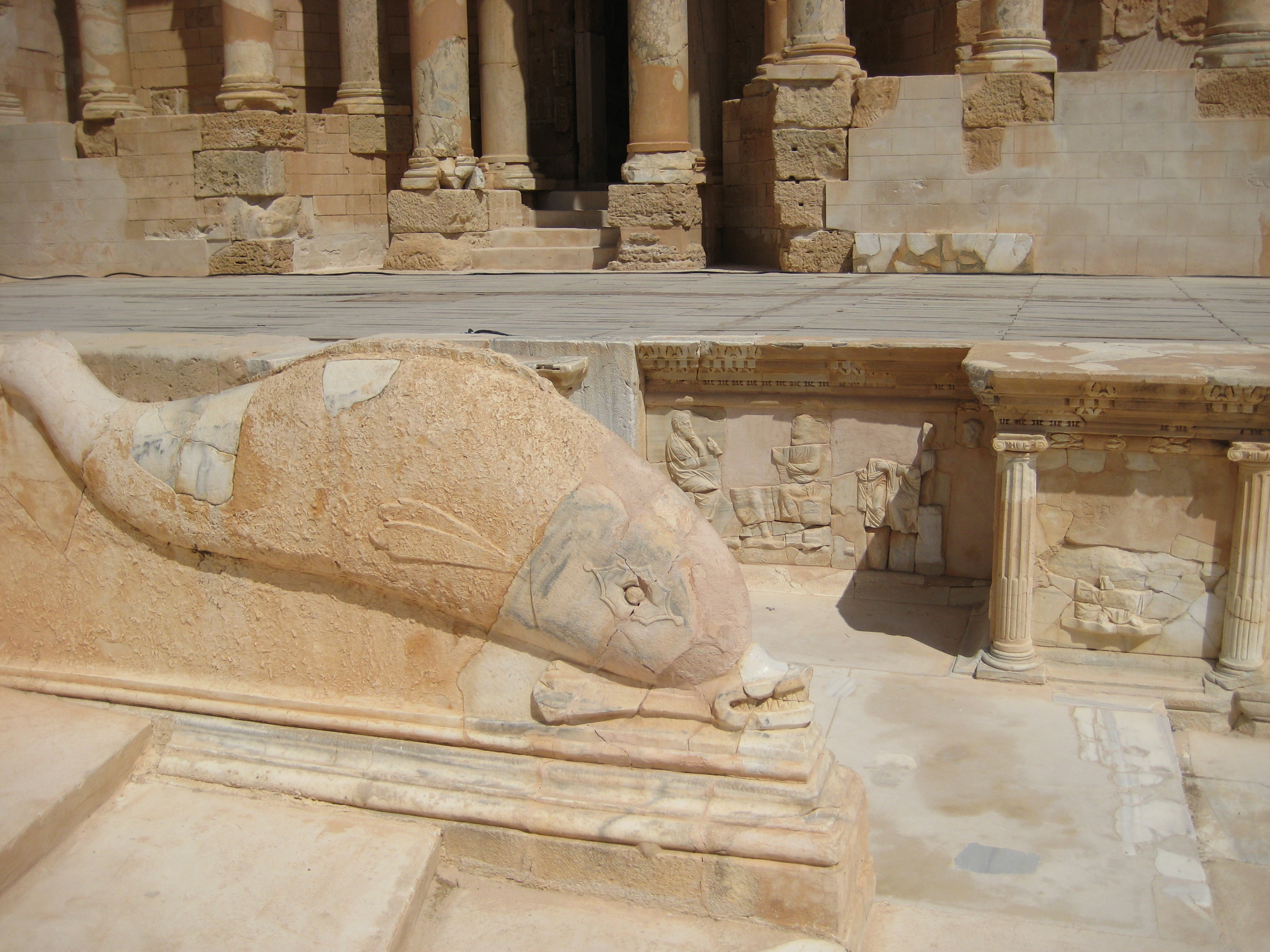
High relief, theater

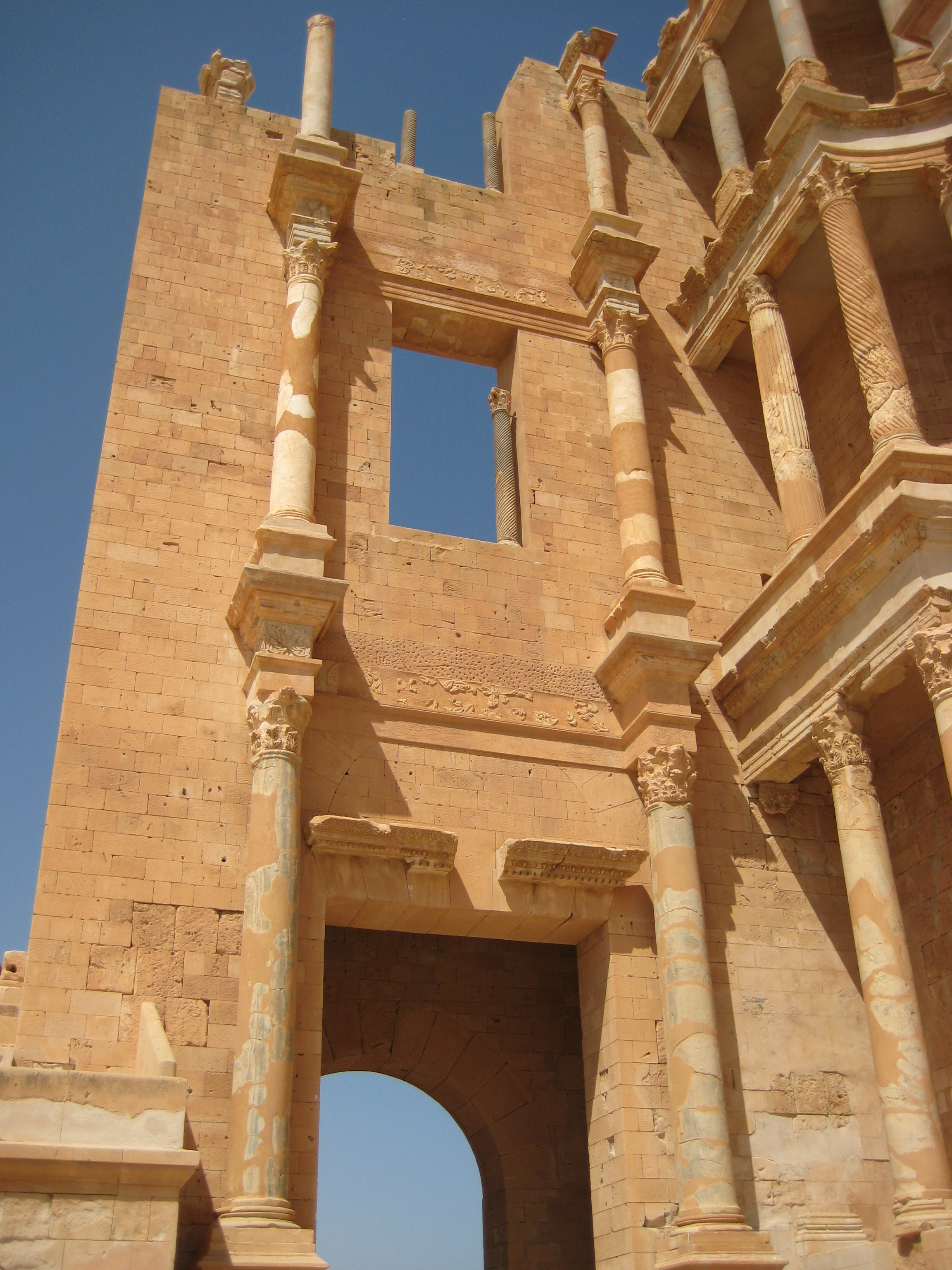
Theater

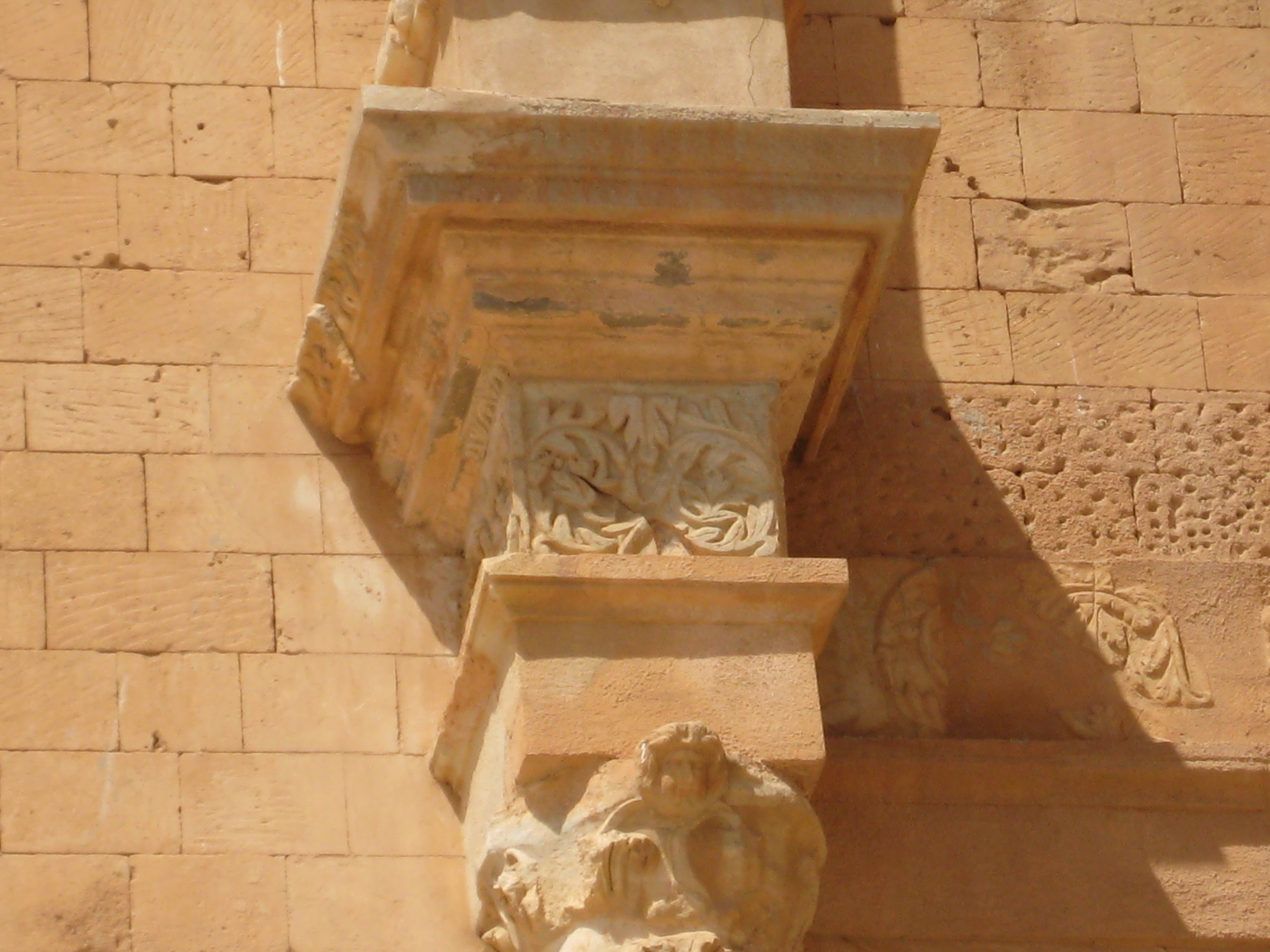
Plinth and capital of columns, theater

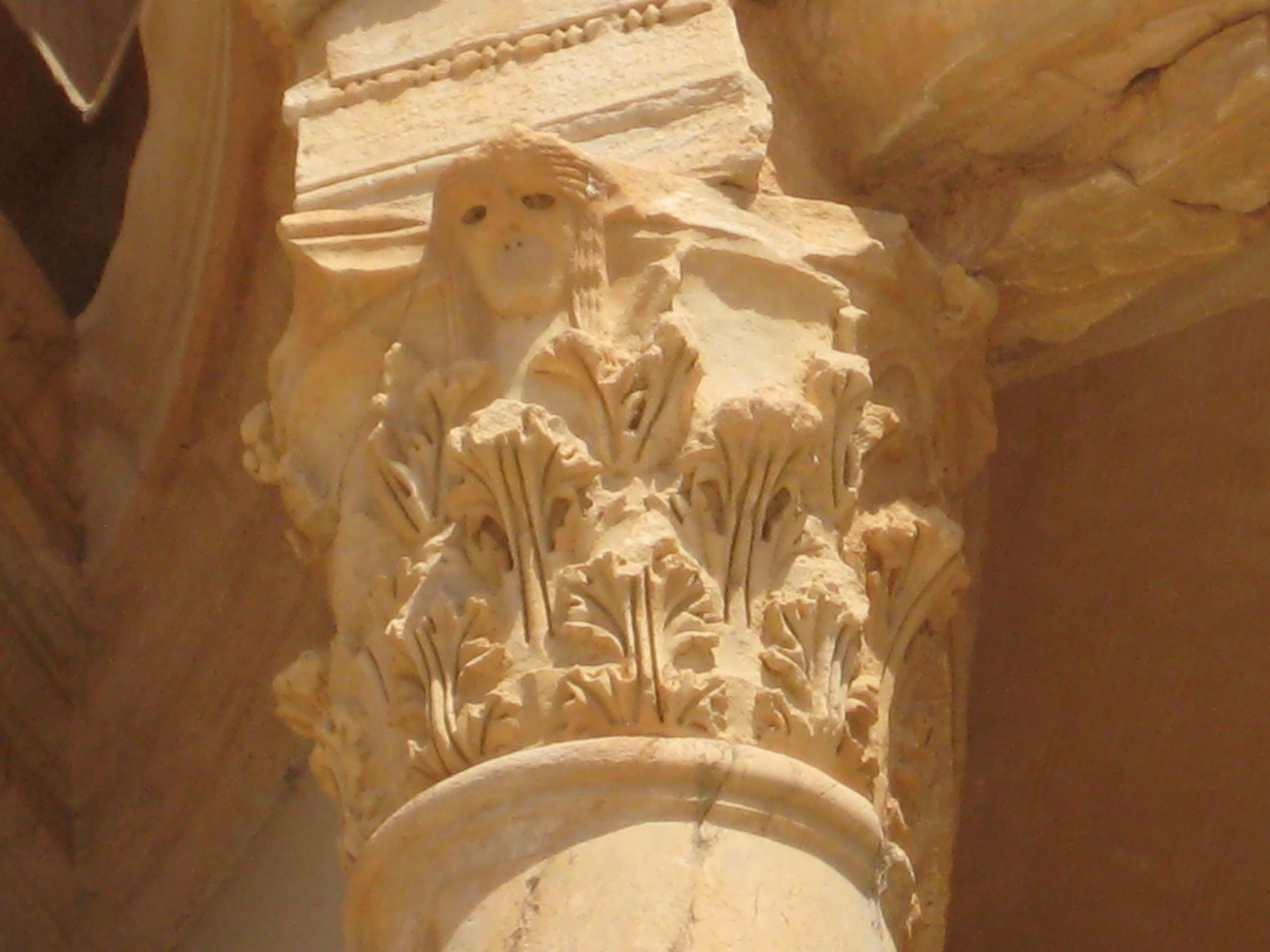
Capital of column, theater

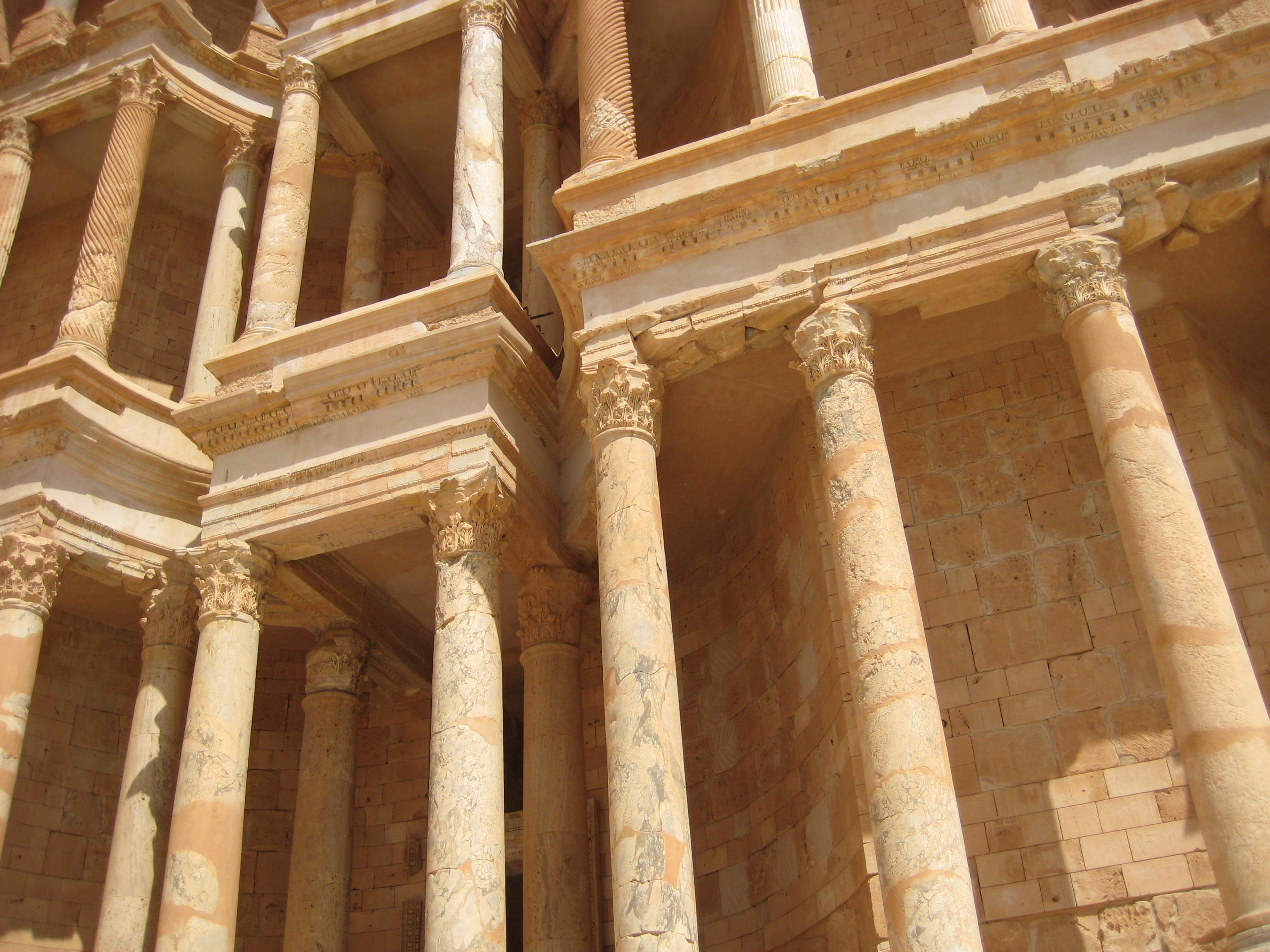
Theater

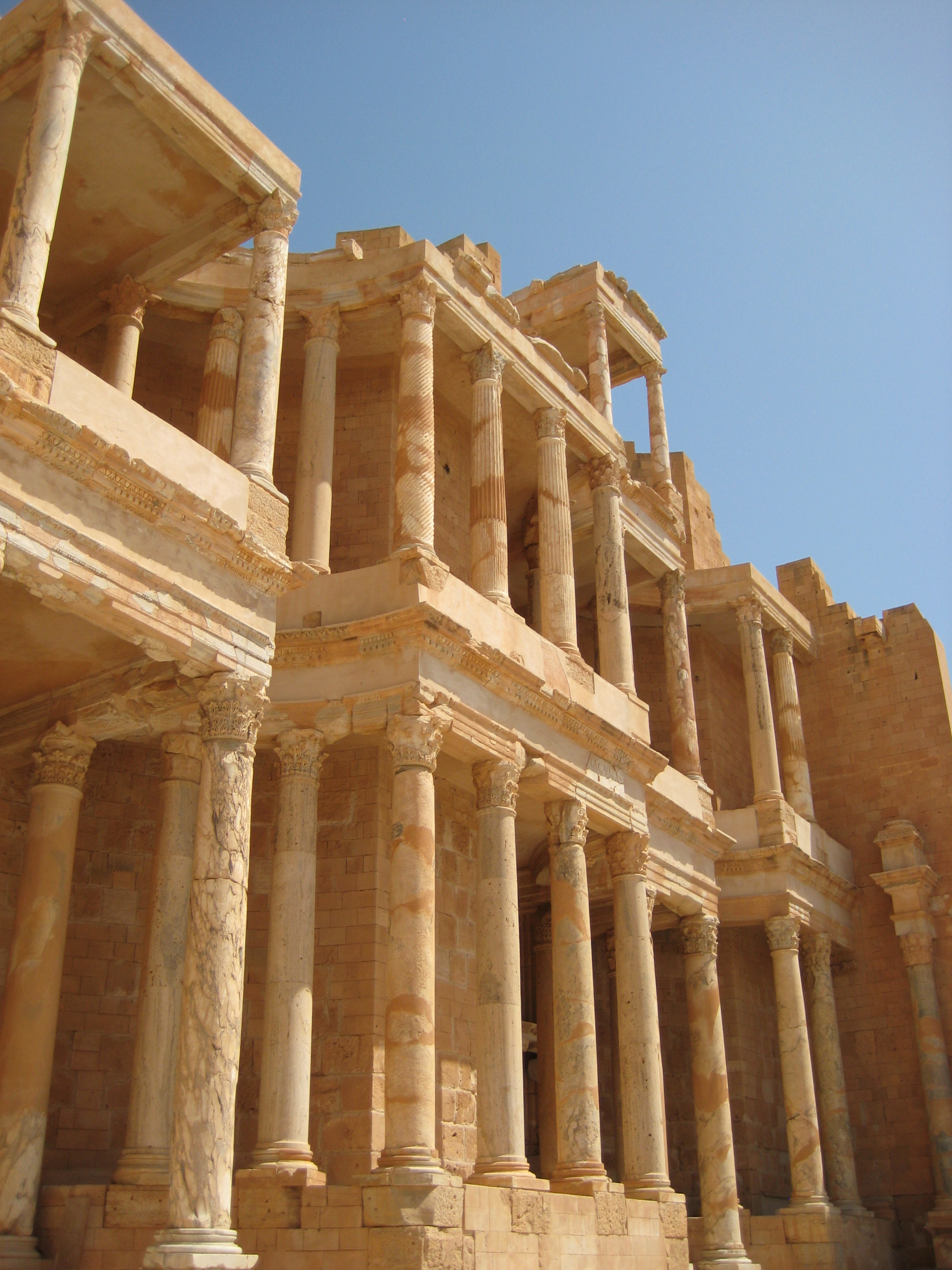
Theater

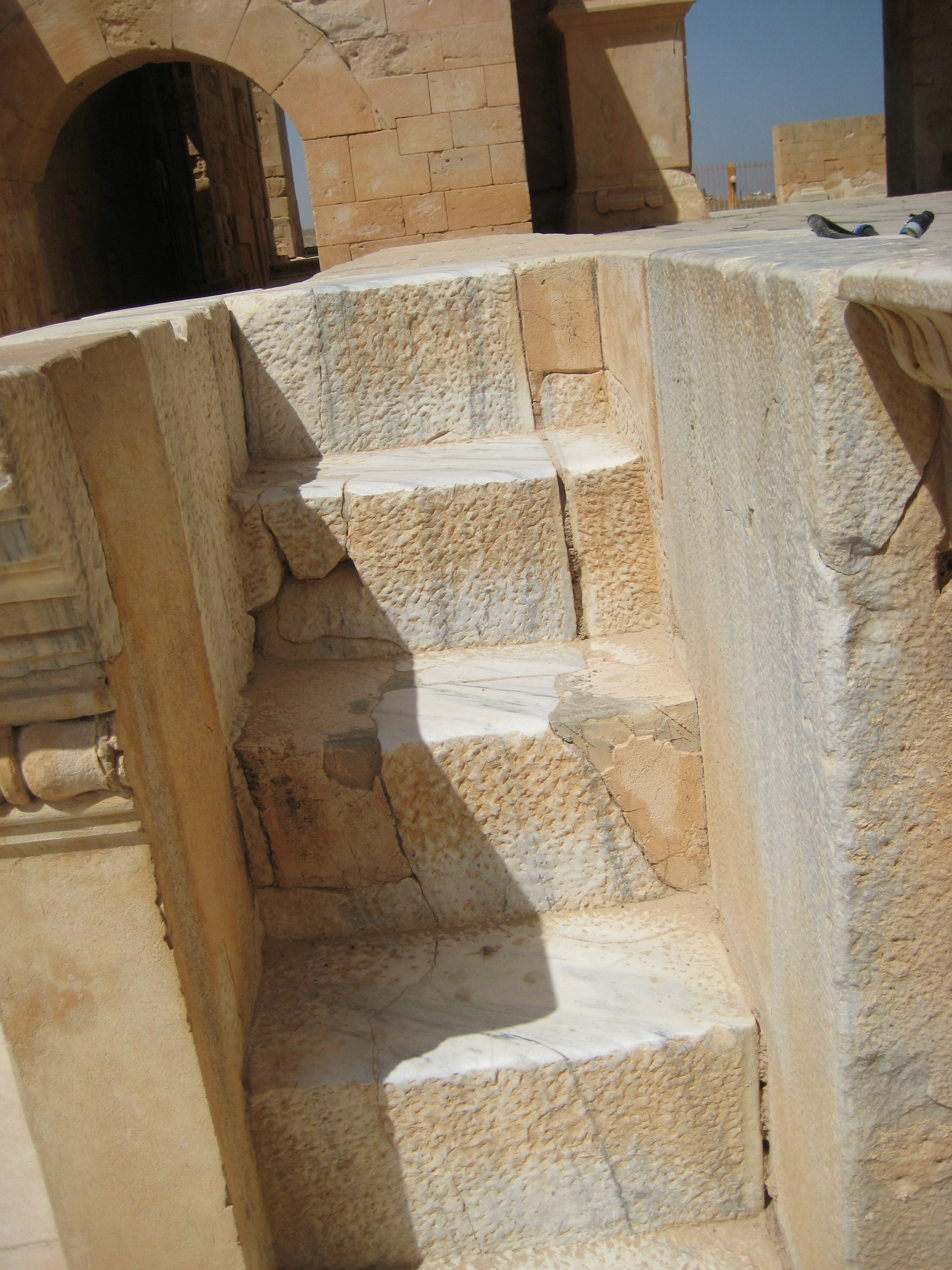
Stairs to the stage, theater

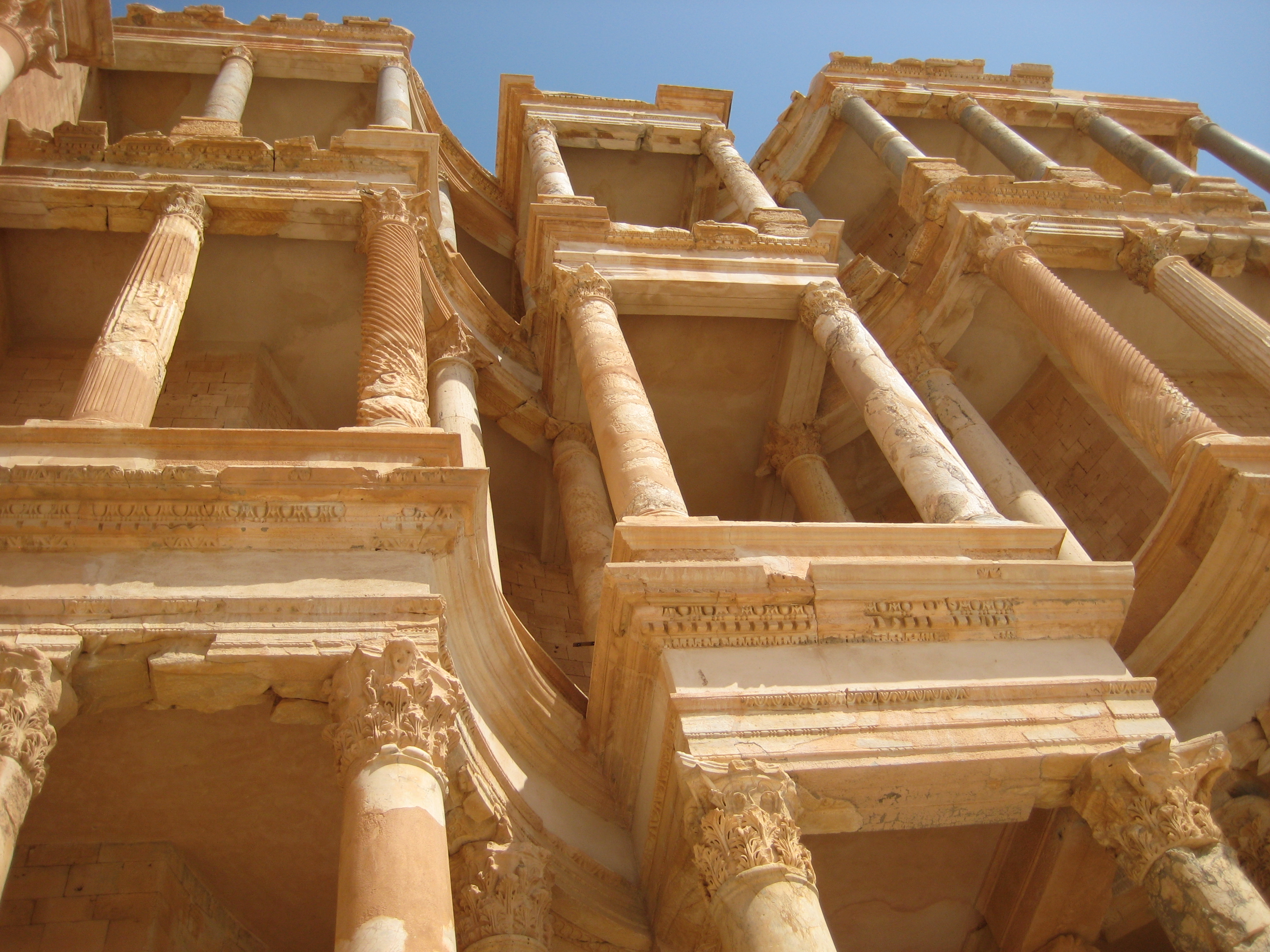
Theater

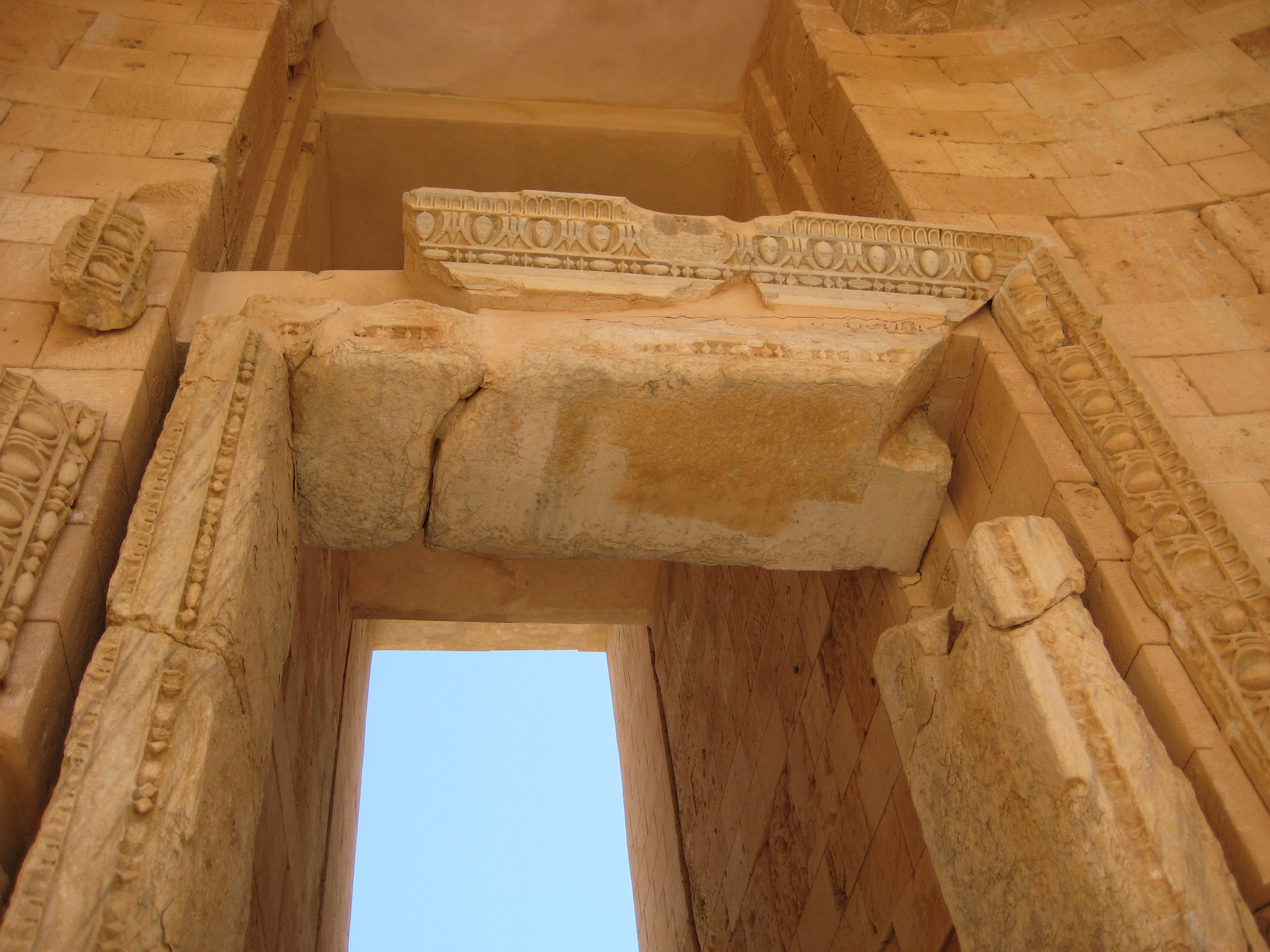
The gate, theater

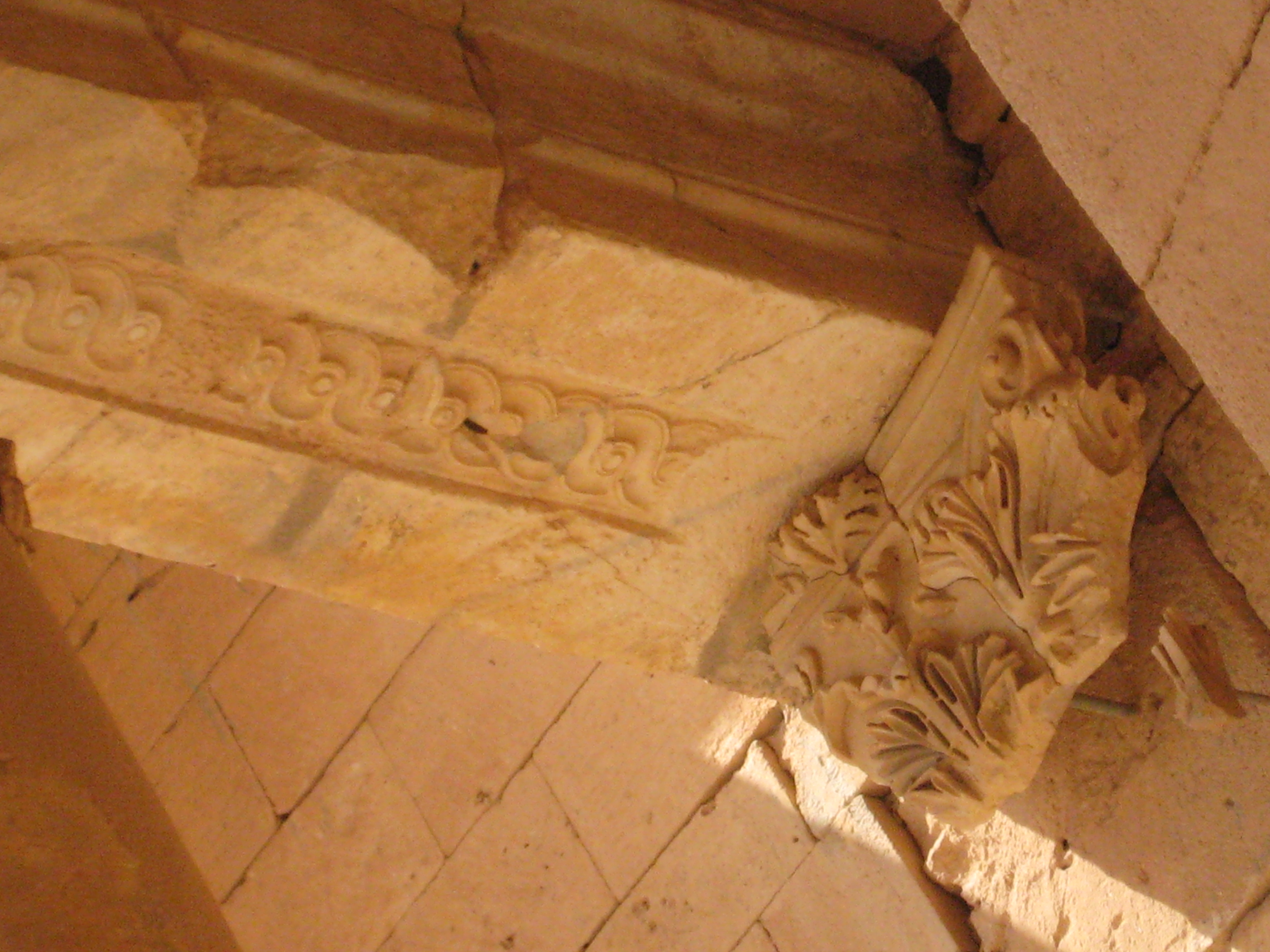
Architrave and capital, theater

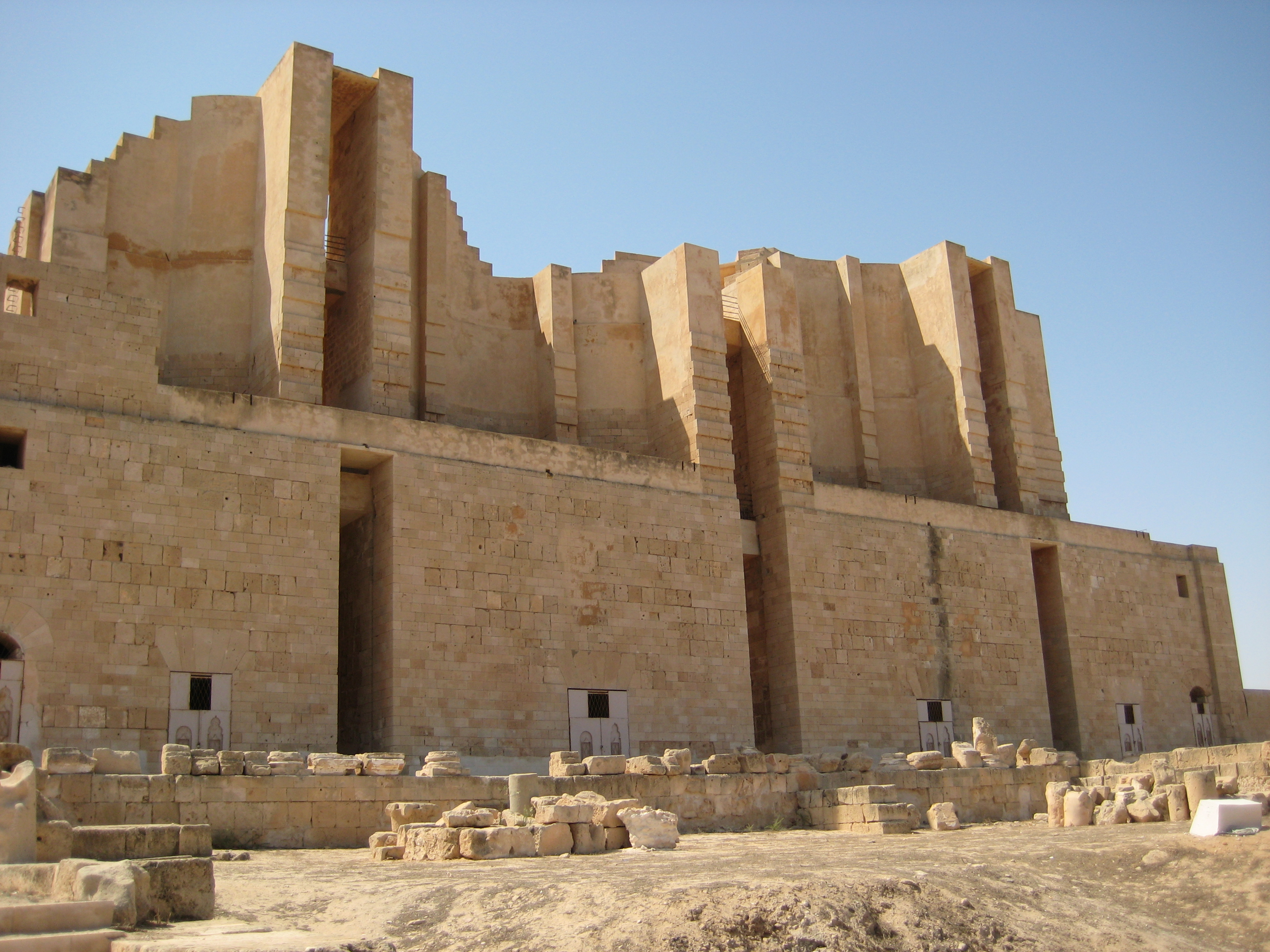
Back side of theater

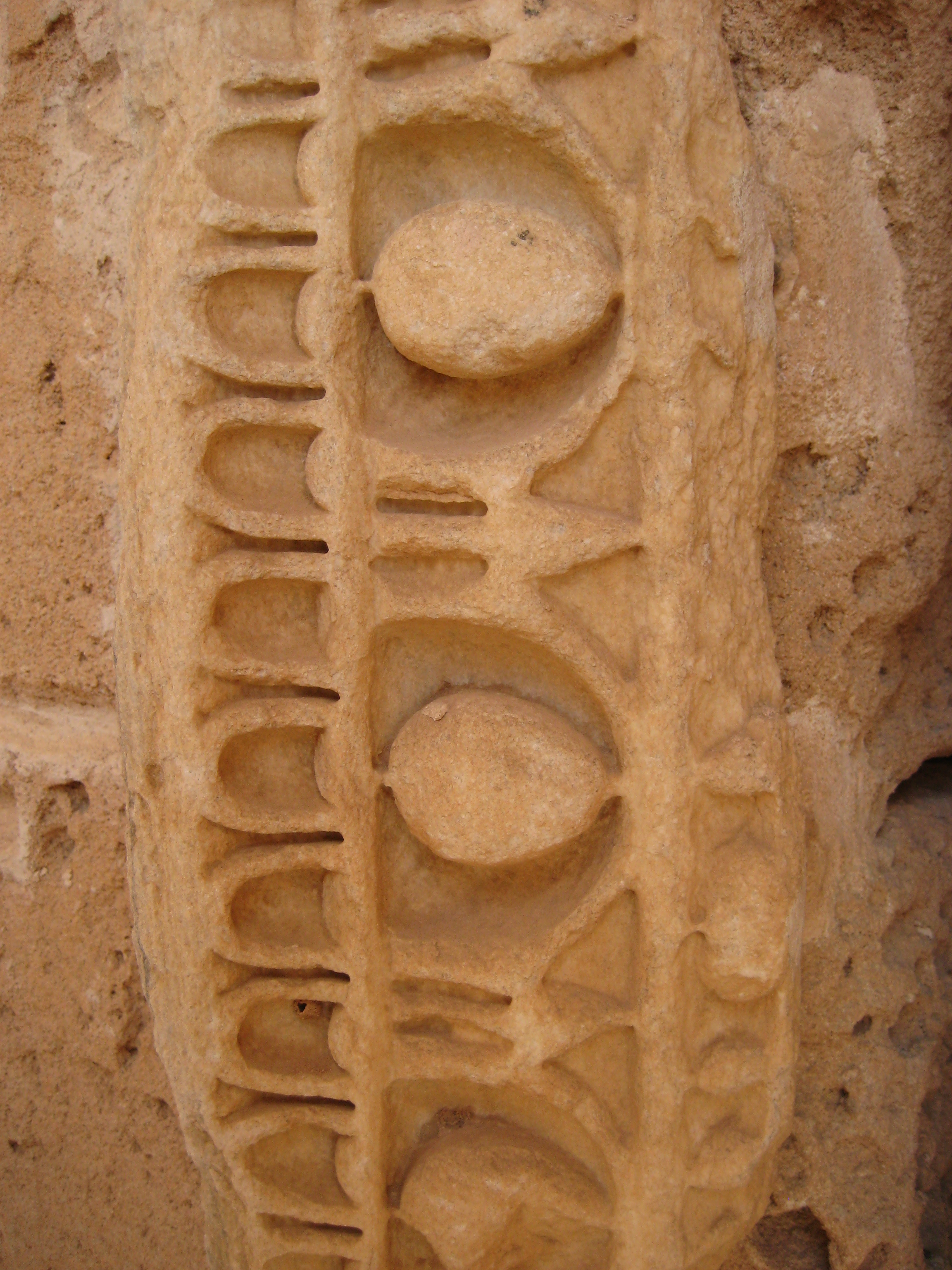
The gate decor element, theater

=== Museum ===
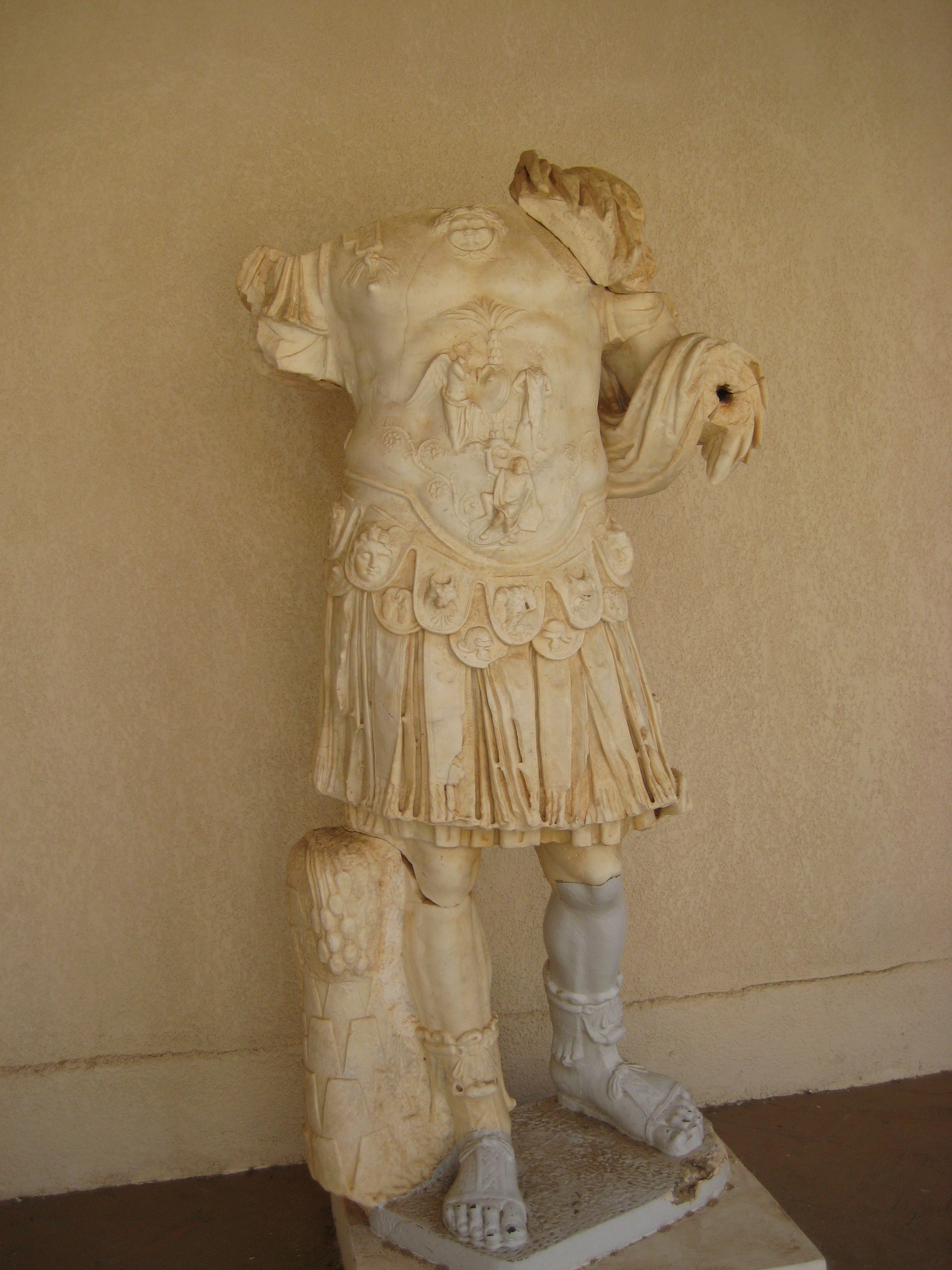
Torso of the Emperor Vespasian, or his son Titus. 1st century Museum courtyard

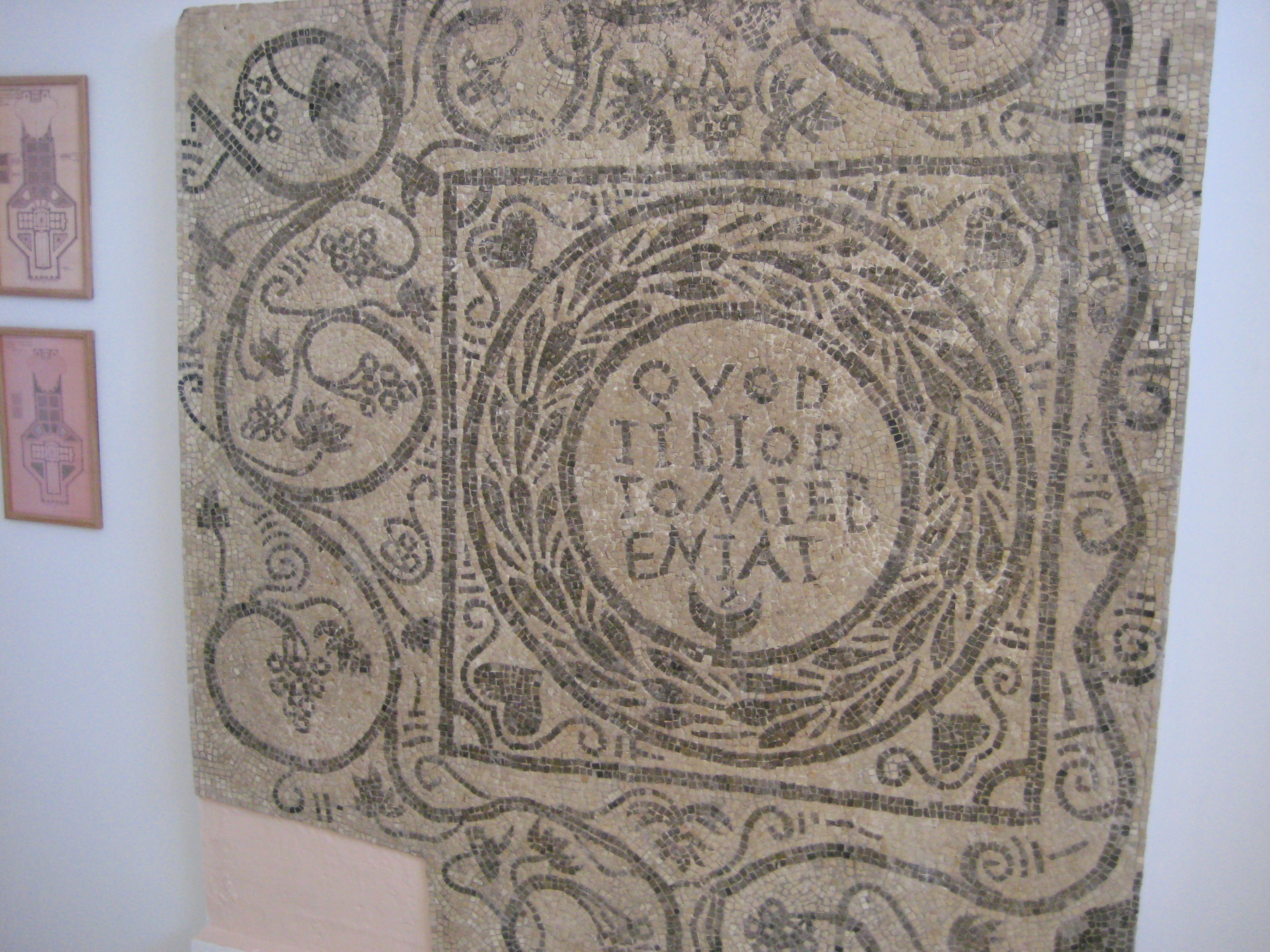
Mosaic. Museum

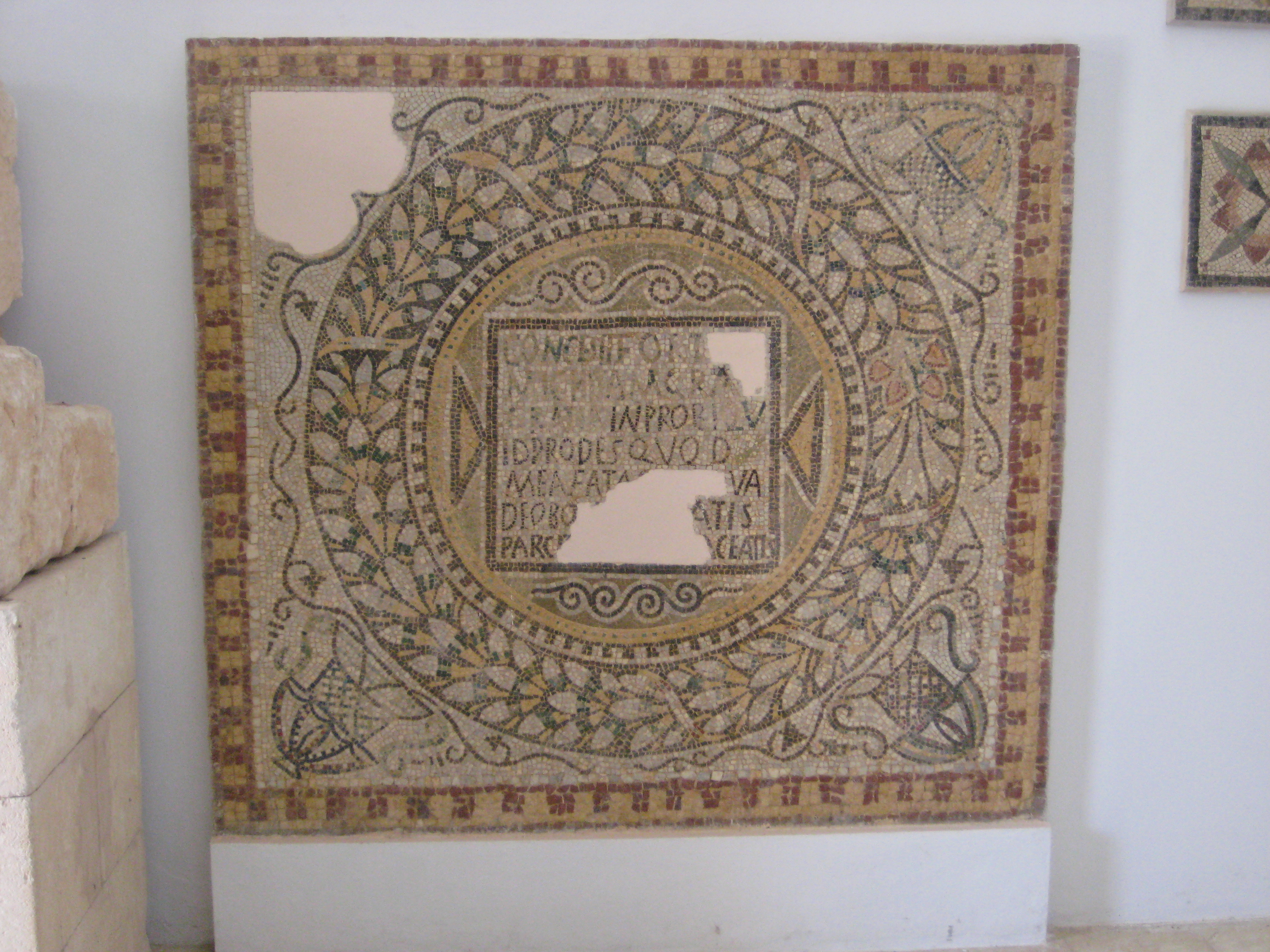
Mosaic. Museum

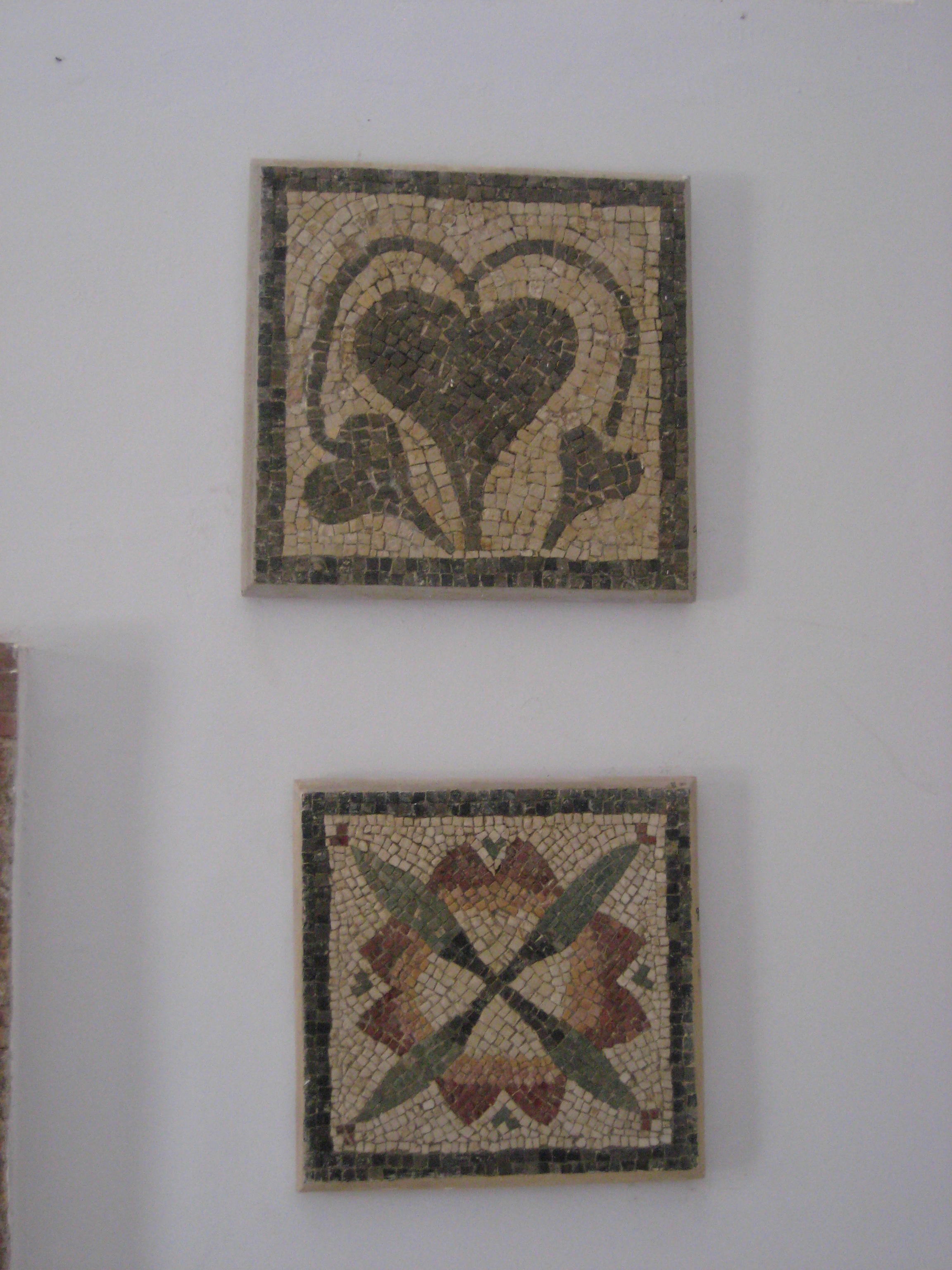
Mosaic. Museum

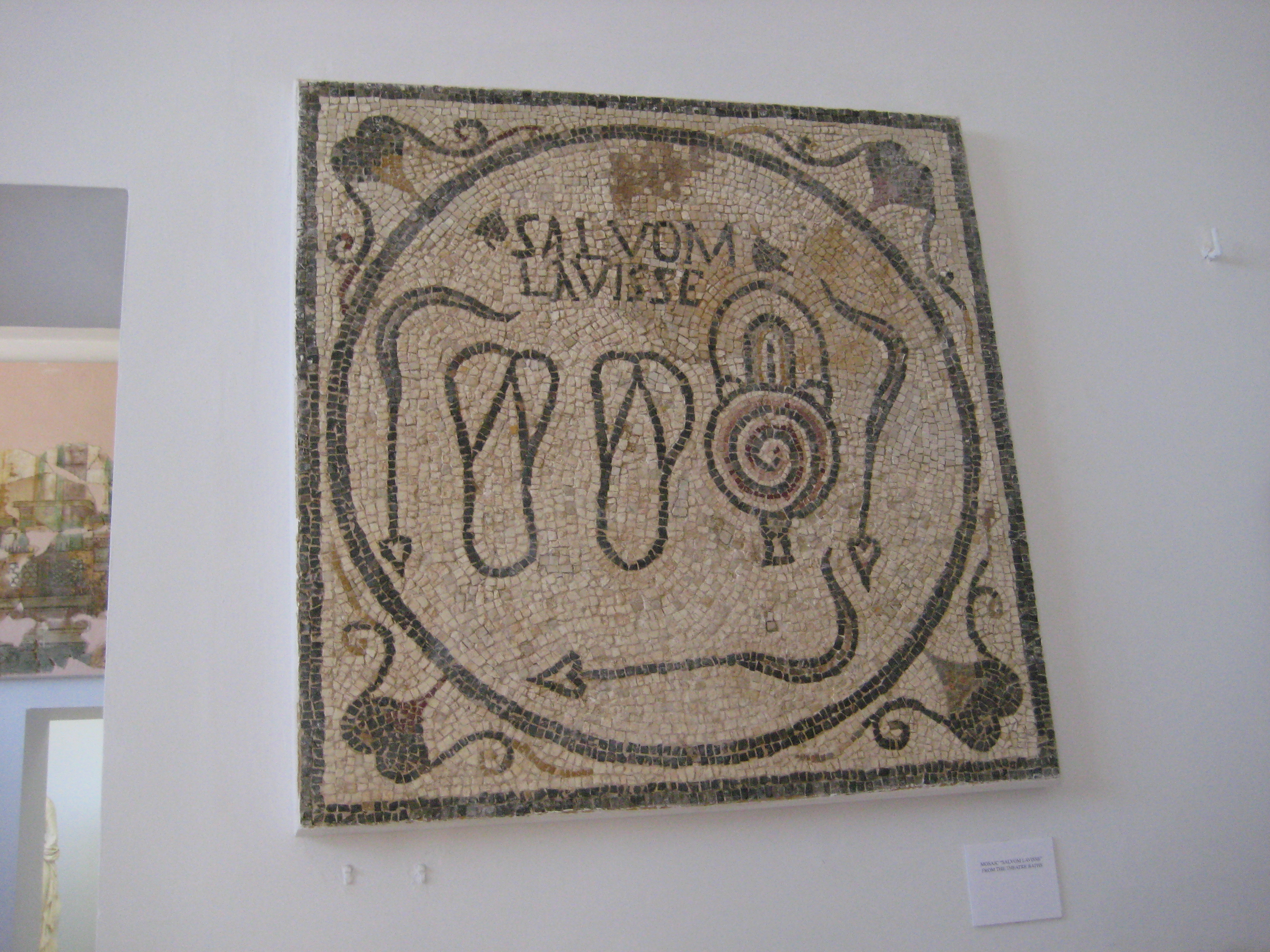
Mosaic from theater baths. Museum."Salvom Lavisse" - "Washing it's well!"

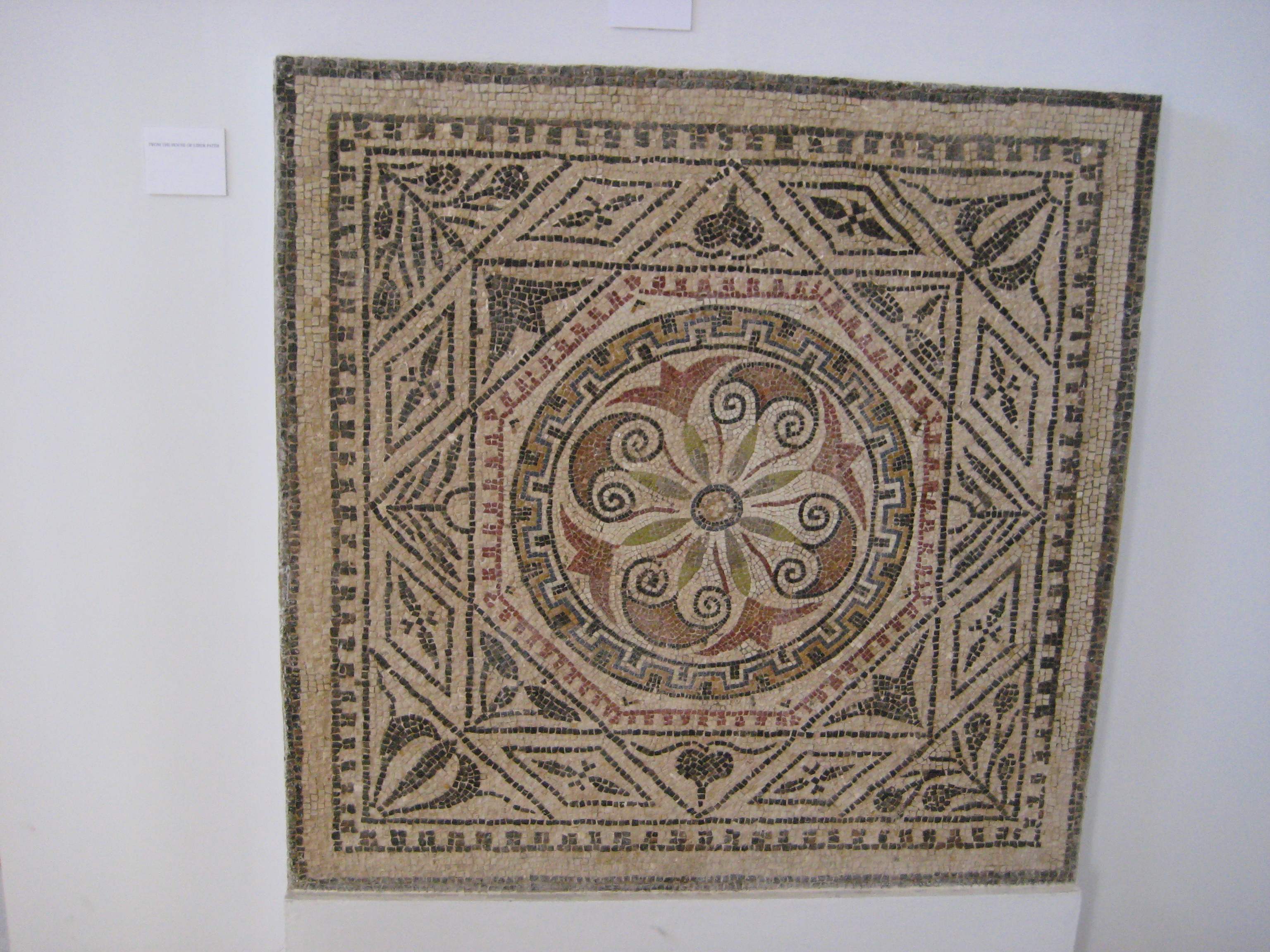
Mosaic. Museum

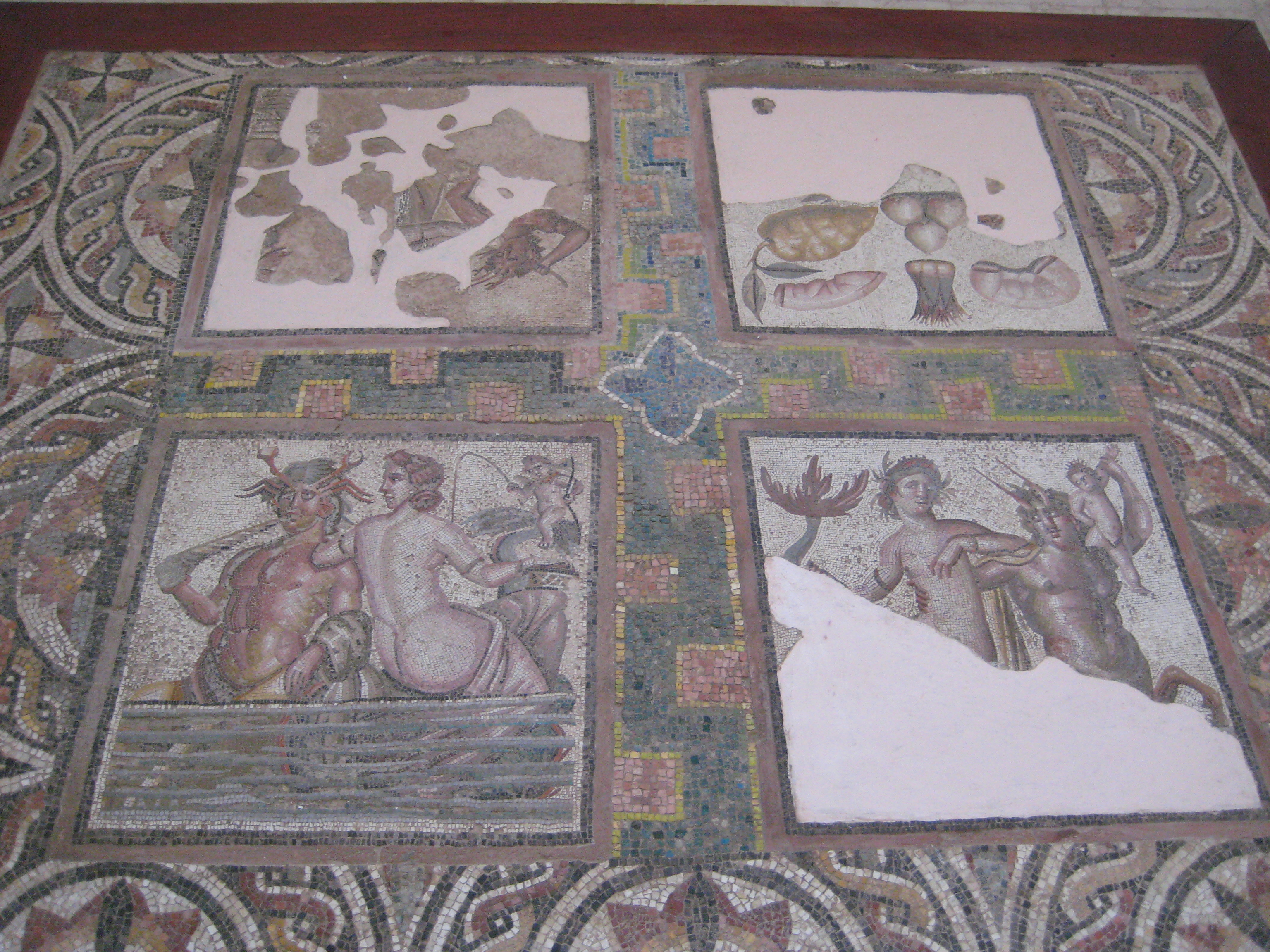
Mosaic. Museum

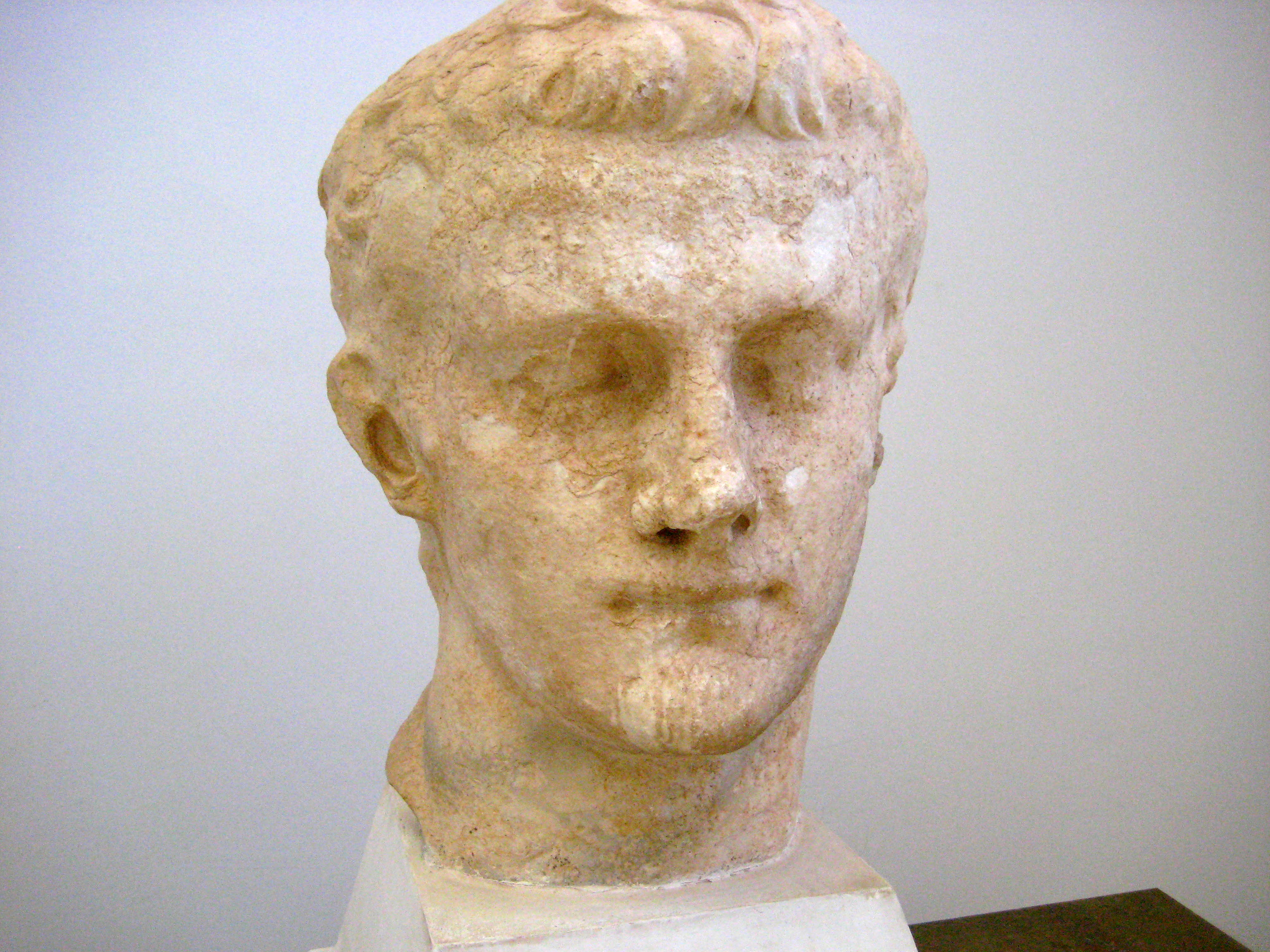
Head. Museum

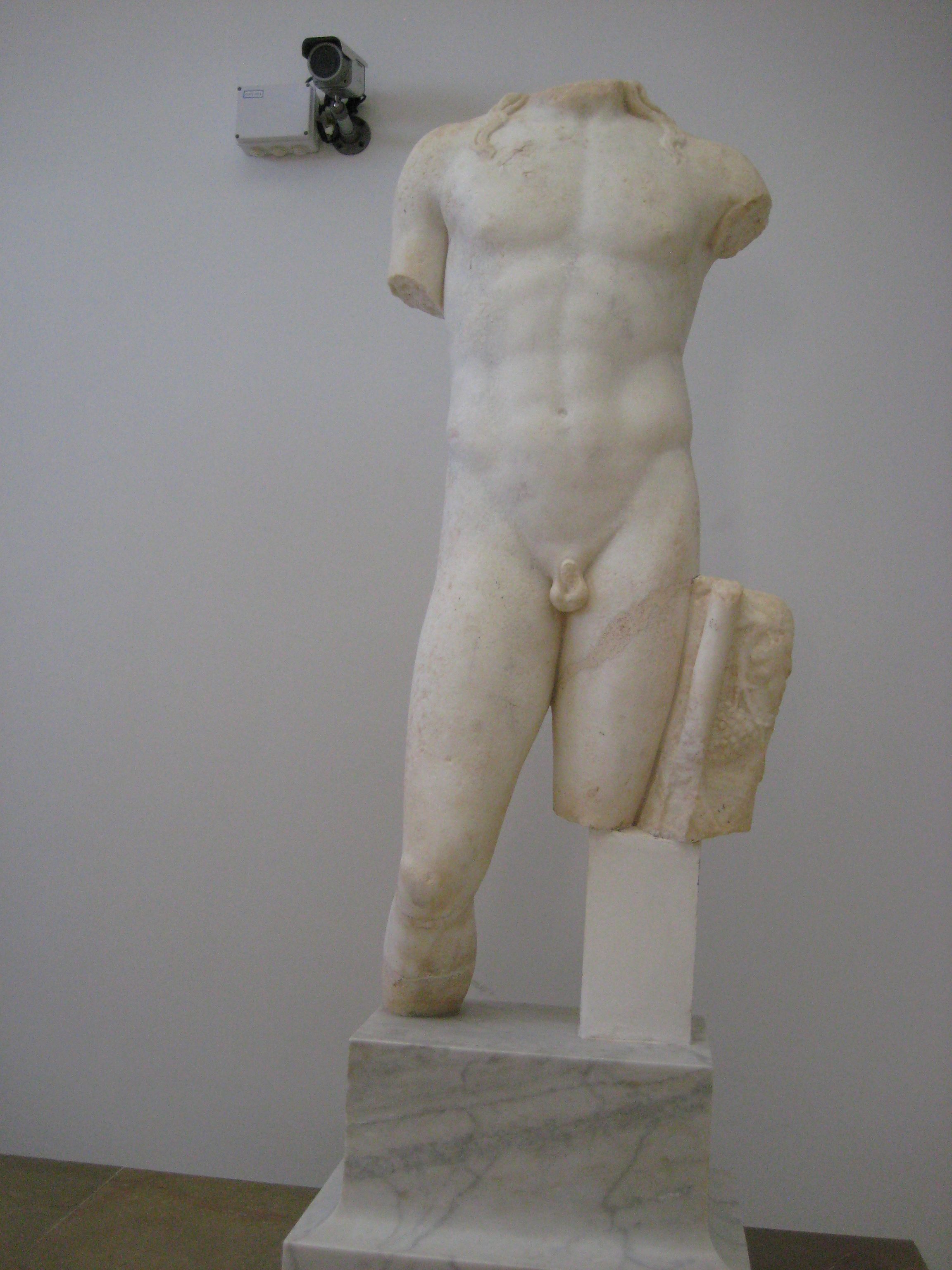
Marble figure of a satyr. From the Forum. Museum

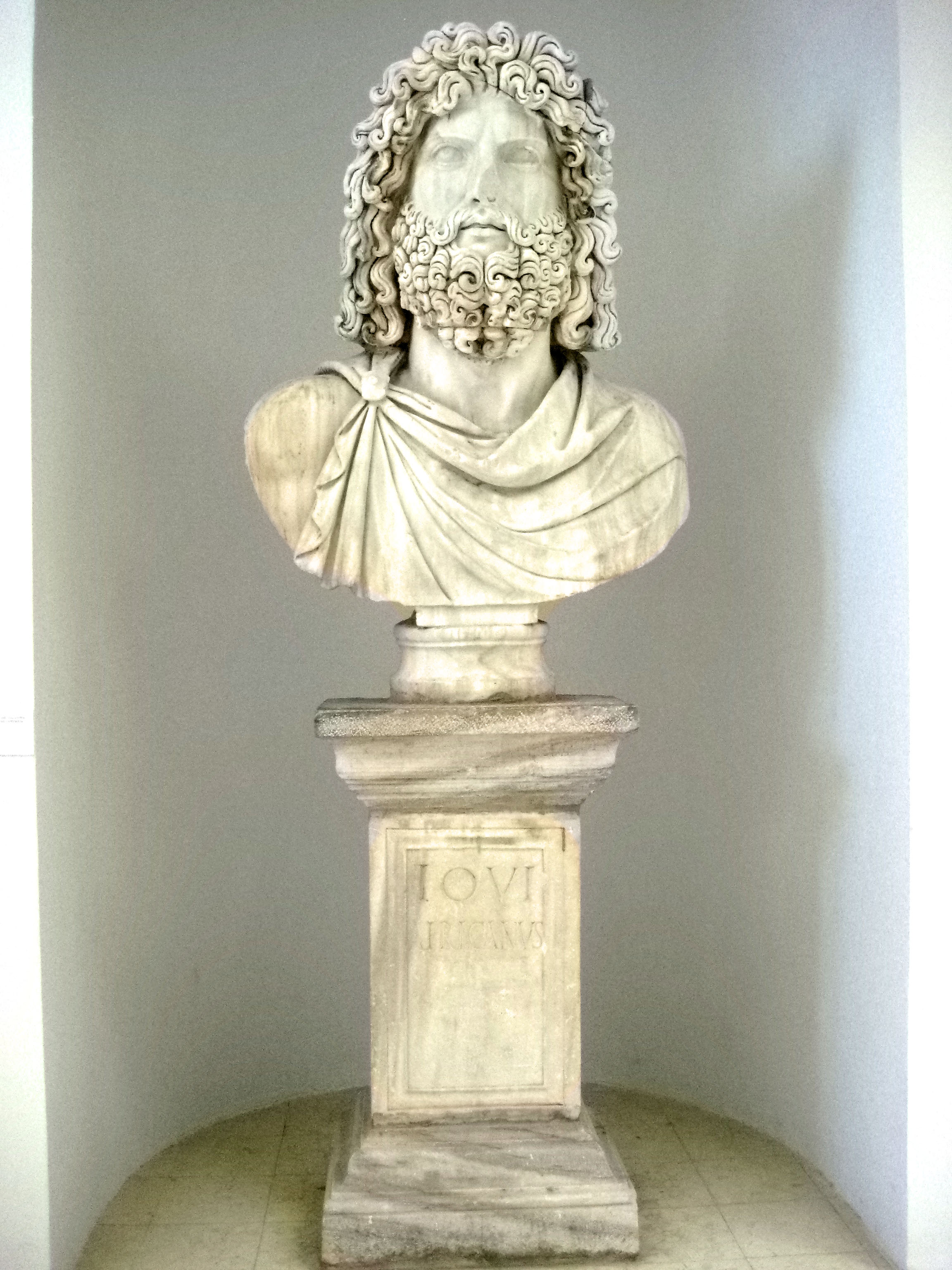
Bust of Jupiter. From the Temple of Jupiter. Museum

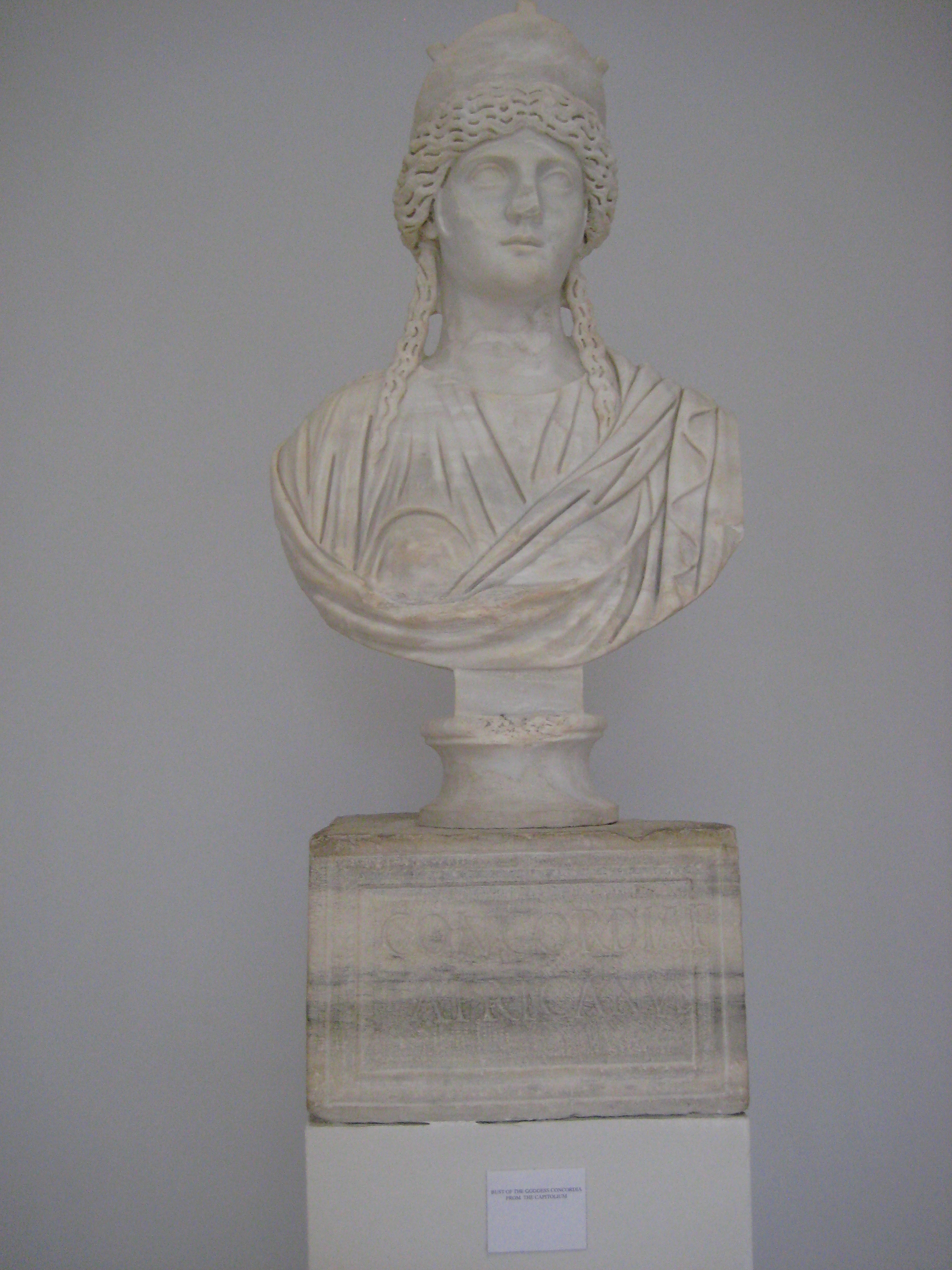
Bust of Goddess Concordia from the Temple of Jupiter. Museum

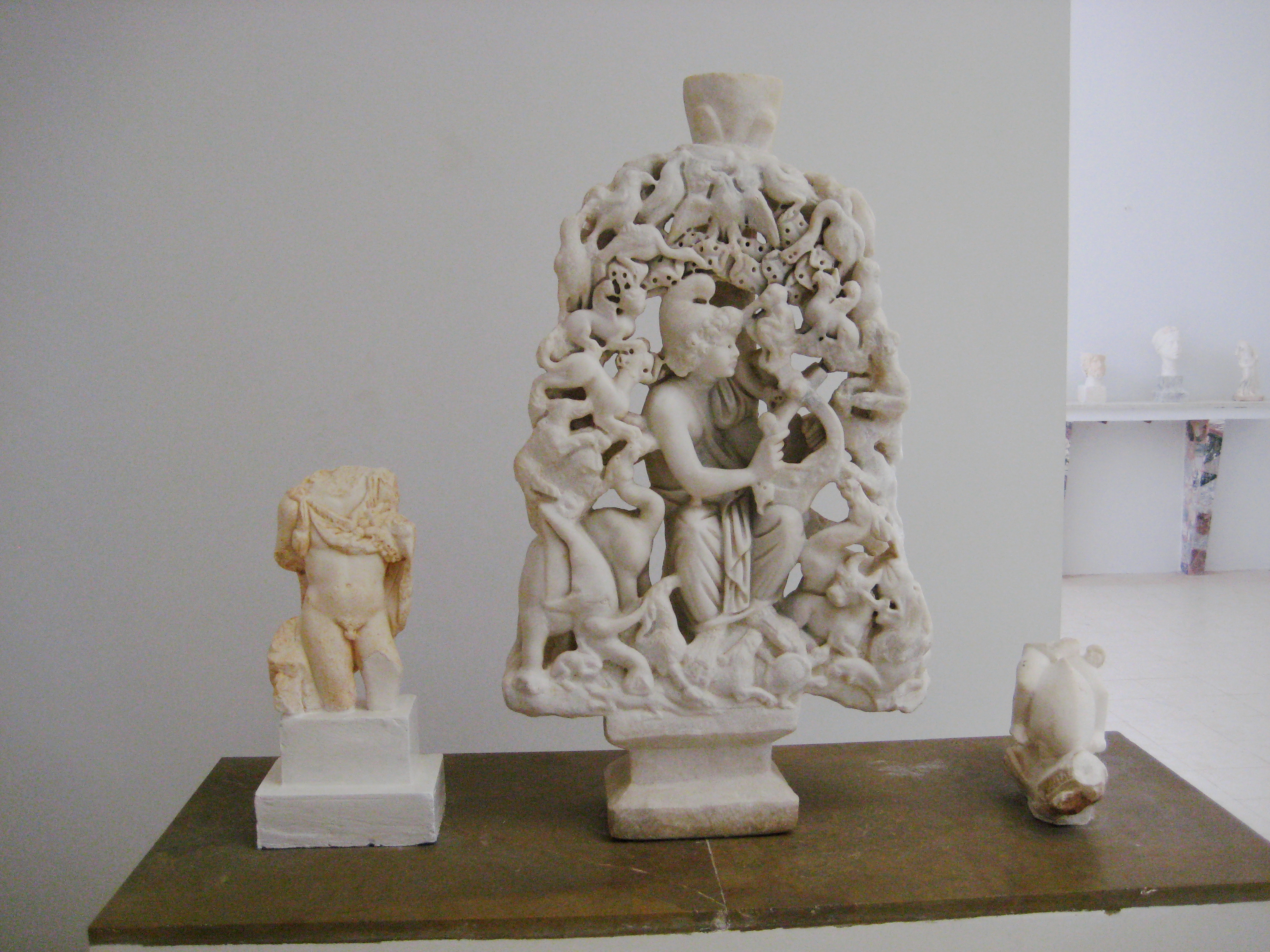
Marble candelabrum showing Orpheus and the animals. From Theatre Baths 3rd century Museum

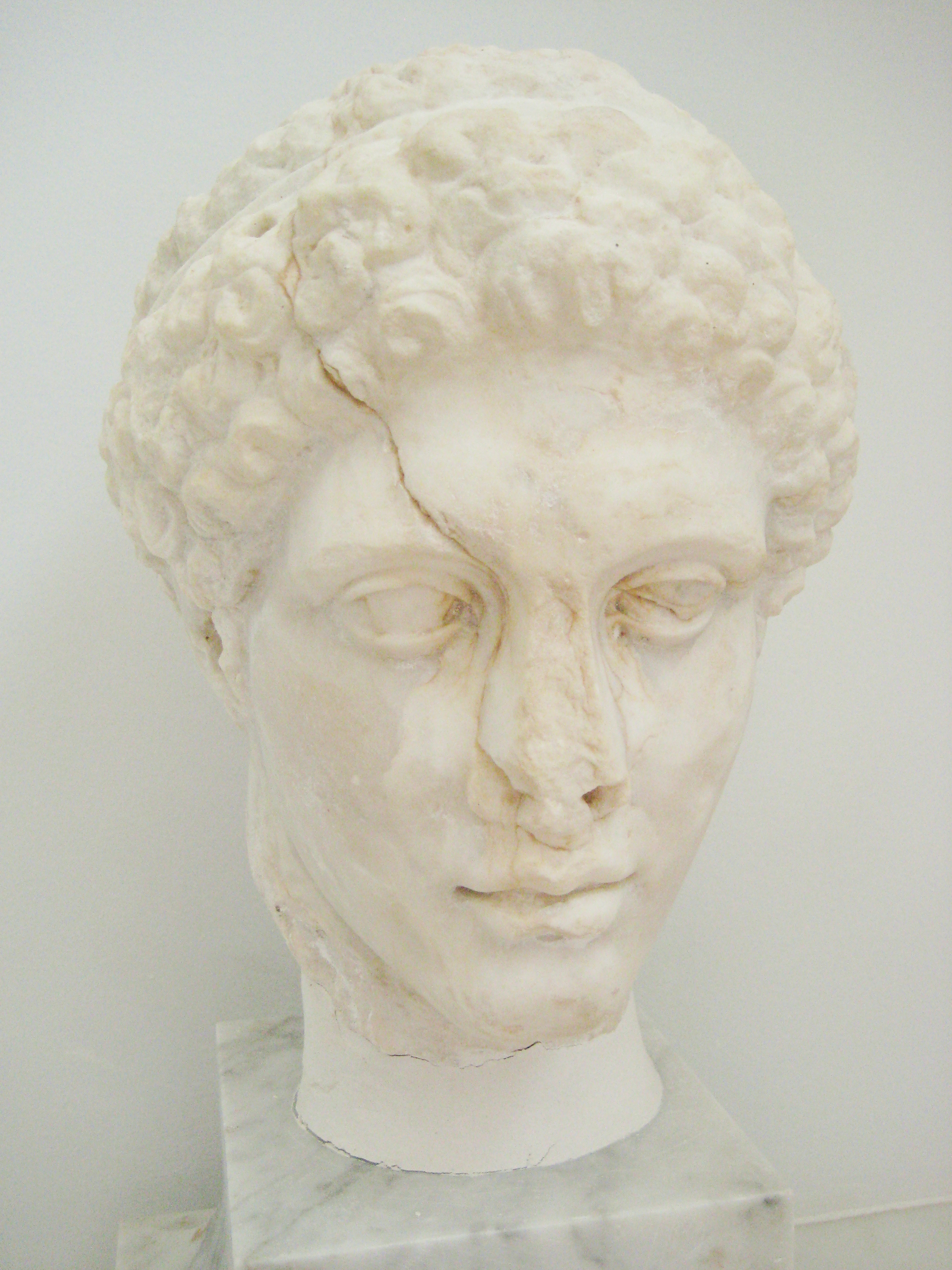
Head. Museum

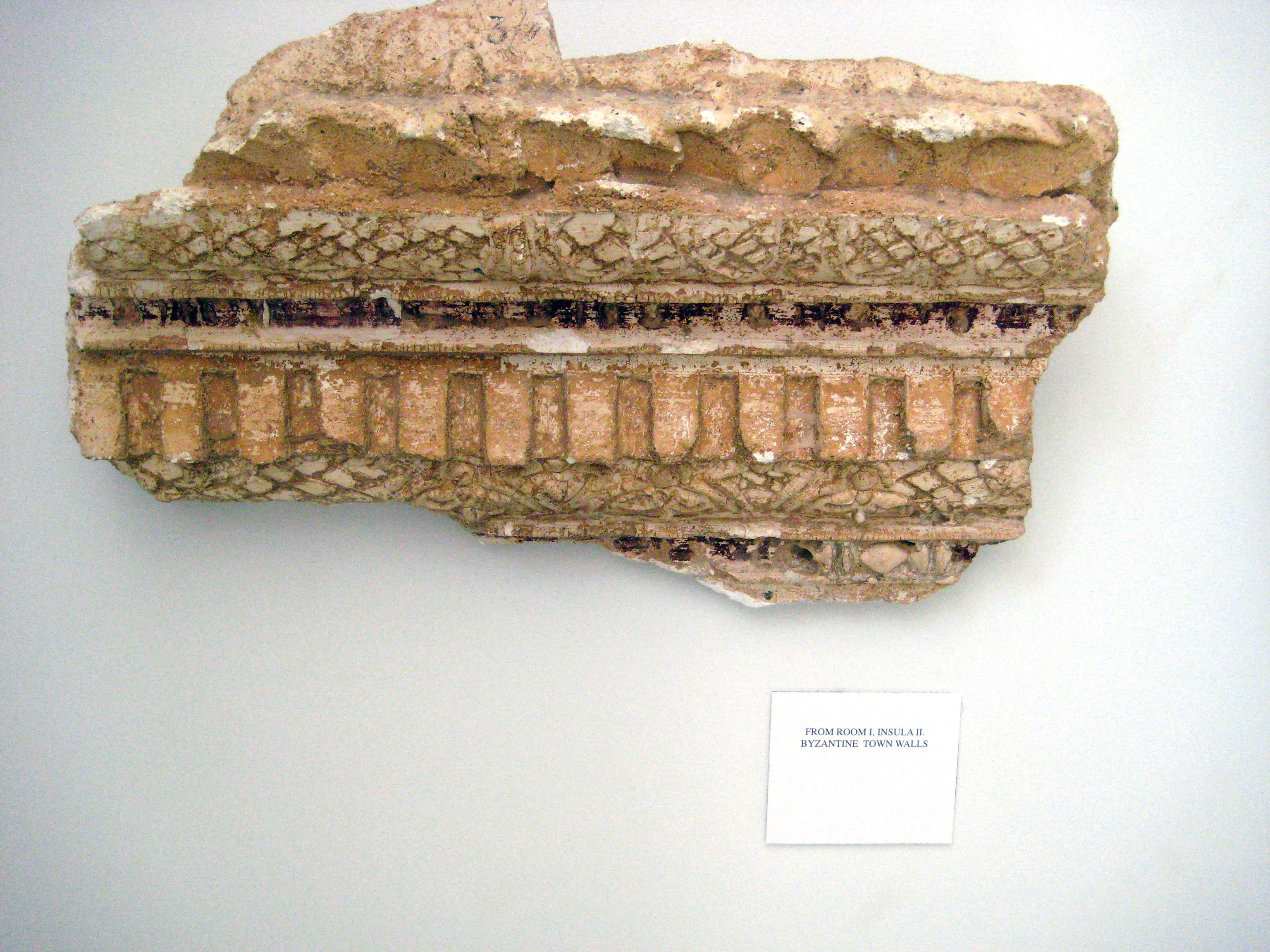
Decor element of Insula (house). Museum

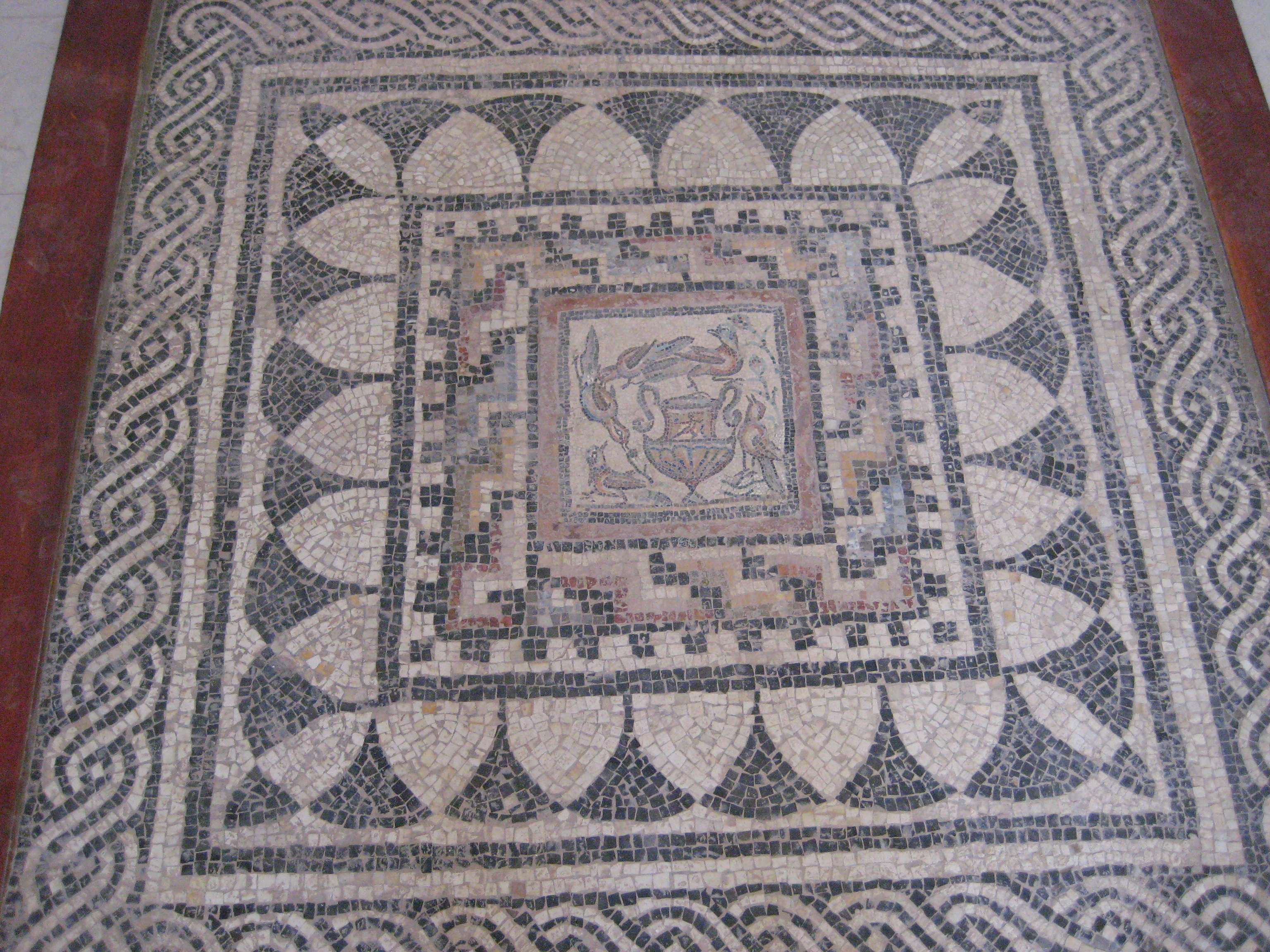
Mosaic. Museum

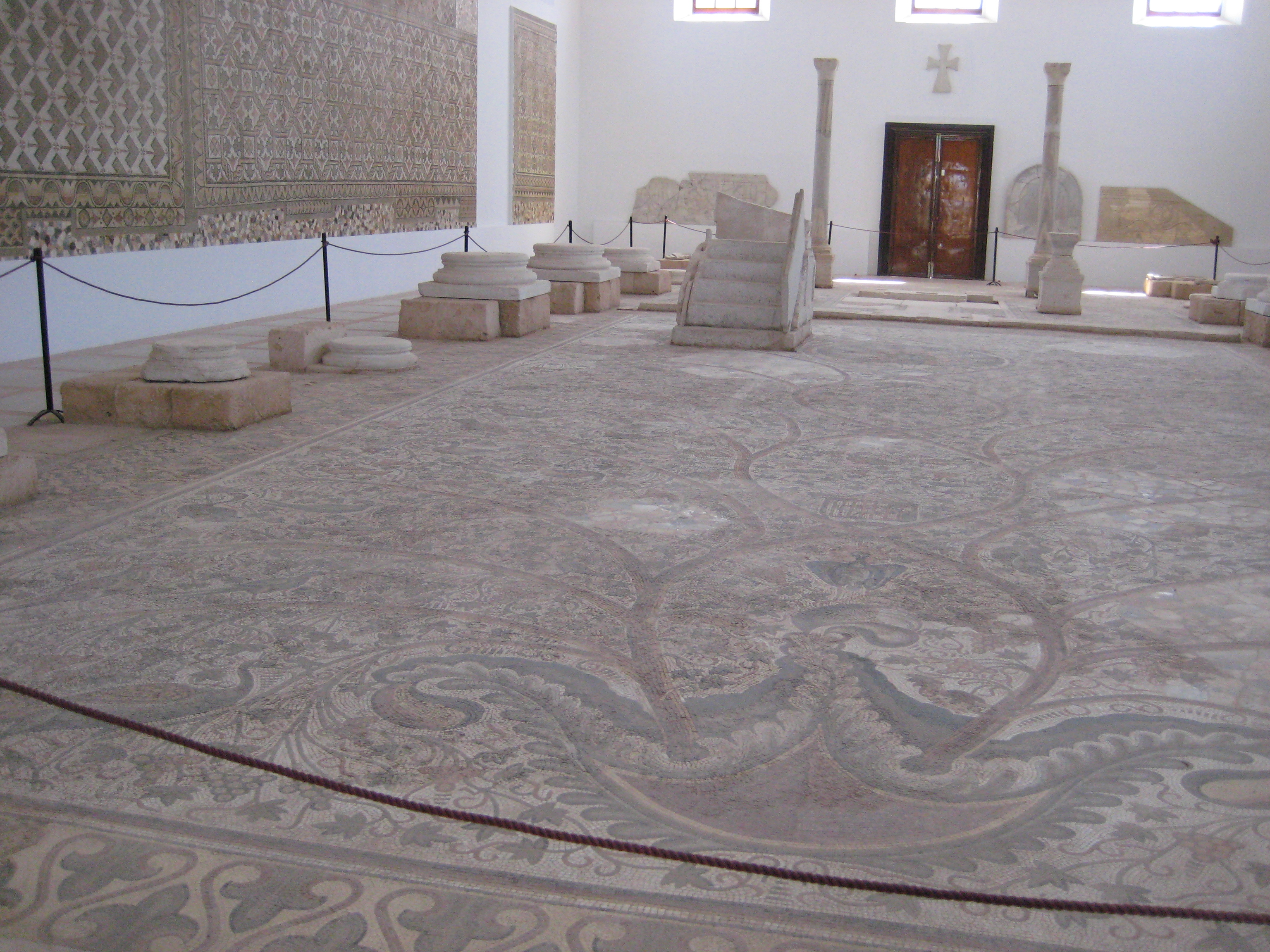
Basilica of Justinian reconstructed in the Site Museum
