= Sintes =

Sintes is a surname. Notable people with the surname include:

- Ariadna Sintes (born 1986), Cuban-Spanish actress
- Claude Sintes (born 1953), French archaeologist and curator
- María del Rosario Síntes, Colombian economist and politician
- Victor Sintès (born 1980), French-born Algerian fencer
- Yvonne Pope Sintes (1930–2021), British aviator of South African origin
