= Ancient theater of Sabratha =

Ancient Roman theater in Tripolitania, Libya

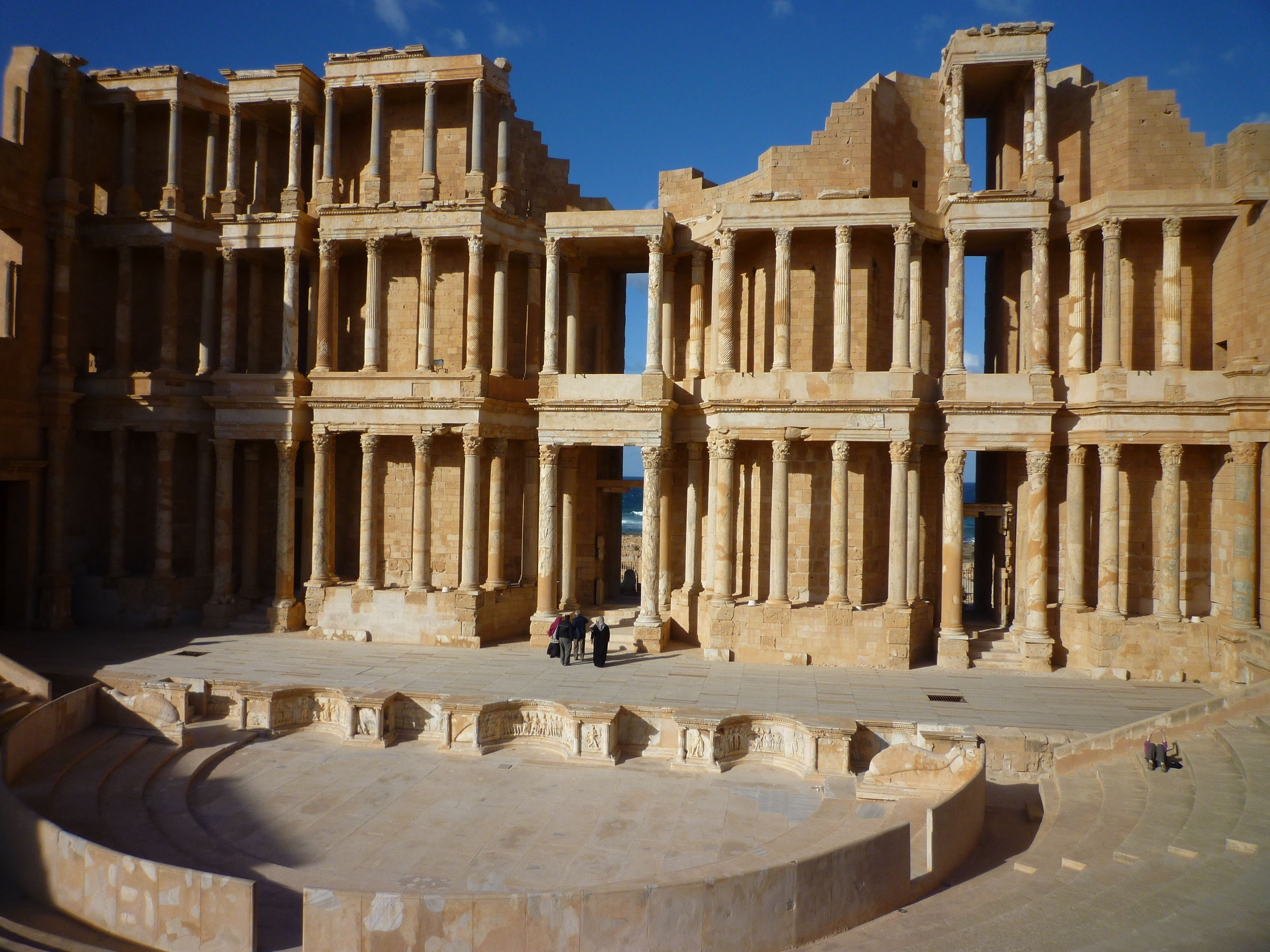
- Stage wall, stage, pulpitum and orchestra.
- Interactive map of Ancient theater of Sabratha
- Location: Sabratha, Proconsular Africa; Libya
- Coordinates: 32°48′19″N 12°29′06″E
- Type: Roman style Theatre
- Height: 22m
- Beginning date: End of the 1st or beginning of the 2nd century
- Heritage status: Monument of a site classified as World Heritage in 1982; Monument classified as World Heritage in Danger in 2016

The ancient theater of Sabratha is the Roman theater of the ancient city of Sabratha in Proconsular Africa (now modern Tripolitania), on the Mediterranean cast of northwestern Libya. The date and circumstances of its construction are undetermined, as are those of its abandonment. Archaeologists can only advance approximate hypotheses, and place its construction around the end of the first century or the beginning of the second. After centuries of abandonment, excavators rediscovered the city and its monument during the Italian occupation of Libya in the early 20th century. The excavation and restoration work carried out between 1927 and 1937 made the theater the most important monument on the Sabratha site, the largest theater in Roman Africa, and the most spectacular in the Roman world in two respects: the colonnade of its stage wall was almost completely reconstructed by a three-level anastylosis, and an exceptional series of bas-reliefs adorned the base of the stage (the pulpitum). It could accommodate around 5,000 spectators and, in its restored state, still holds 1,500.

The period of World War II and the Libyan monarchy dampened interest in Sabratha, which resurfaced when the site was listed as a UNESCO World Heritage Site in 1982, for which the theater was a key monument in the dossier. However, the serious deterioration of the Libyan situation from 2011 onwards raised fears concerning the conservation of the monument and its bas-reliefs, a concern noted by the site's inclusion on the list of World Heritage in Danger on July 14, 2016.

== History ==
Schematic plan of ancient Sabratha. The theater is in 27

The theater was probably built at the request of private sponsors. The date of construction, which is not known with certainty, can be placed at the crossroads of the 1st and 2nd centuries AD, a period of great prosperity for the province of Proconsular Africa. Archaeologist Antonino Di Vita places it in the reign of Commodus (180-192) or, with reservations, in that of Septimius Severus (193-211).

The theater was probably damaged, like the rest of the city, during the natural disasters that struck Sabratha, which Antonino Di Vita dates to between 306 and 310, but some inscriptions found in the theater indicate that it was still in use in the mid-fourth century. It was again affected by the earthquakes and tsunamis of 365 that struck the eastern Mediterranean. Abandoned after a fire, as evidenced by the layers of ash found during excavations, it was occupied by private dwellings, then used as a quarry for reclaimed material during the Byzantine reoccupation of Africa in the 2nd century.

As Libya became an Italian colony at the beginning of the 20th century, Italian archaeologists were the driving force behind the rediscovery of the theater. From the 1920s onwards, the Fascist regime's propaganda supported research that testified to the ancient Roman presence on this territory and justified Italian colonization as a return. Restoration of the most spectacular monuments became a priority. When Renato Bartoccini began excavating the theater in 1927, it was no more than a mound of sand and masonry. Giacomo Guidi succeeded him in 1928, and from 1932 onwards undertook a meticulous restoration of the stage wall, based on the study of the surviving foundations and the scattered columns that had been found. The restoration, completed in 1937 by Giacomo Caputo, gave the building its present monumental stature. It was inaugurated by Mussolini, who ended his tour of Libya by attending a performance of Sophocles' Oedipus Rex in this exceptional setting. At the same time, the creation of the Libyan coastal road was commemorated by the issue on March 15, 1937 of Italian colonial postage stamps depicting the theater's tiers behind two columns in the foreground.

World War II and the post-war period delayed the publication of a descriptive monograph of the theater by the Italian Giacomo Caputo until 1959.

The entire archaeological complex was listed as a UNESCO World Heritage Site in 1982, on the basis of a report noting its "grandiose monuments, the most famous of which is the theater, with the three orders of columns of its frons scenae". A timid opening up of the country to tourism from 1993, accentuated in 2003 with the lifting of the air embargo on the country, meant that Sabratha and its theater could be admired among the so-called must-see sites.

== Threats to the site and the theater ==
The theater is the emblematic monument of Sabratha's archaeological site, but its conservation is under threat: the local stones, of mediocre quality, are not protected by a plaster as in Antiquity, and are exposed to corrosion from winds and salt-laden sea spray, while tourism at the end of the 20th century has raised the risk of vandalism. More seriously, in 2014, the deterioration of the political situation in Libya since 2011 prompted UNESCO to express concern about the risk of illicit trafficking of archaeological heritage objects. More recently, in 2015, the head of the Libyan Antiquities Service, Ahmed Hassan, warned of the possibility of looting and ransacking of antiquities as in Iraq and Syria. For these reasons, the entire site of Sabratha and its theater were included on the list of World Heritage in Danger on July 14, 2016.

== Architecture ==
Theater layout. Fs = Frons scaenae, Ph = guest doors, Pr = royal doors, Cl = backstage, S = stage, P = pulpitum, V = main vomitory or aditus maximus, Cc = corridor, Cv = cavea, O = orchestra.

The building, located to the east of the forum and close to the sea, is oriented so that spectators face north, but is significantly out of line with the regular plan of the district. It is built from sandstone quarried nearby, which gives the restored monument a reddish hue. This is not the original color, as the whole was covered in stucco, traces of which remain. The foundation rests on rocky ground, the slight depression of which was used to hollow out the central orchestra. Unlike other ancient theaters, which take advantage of a hillside to support their structure, Sabratha's ancient theater was built on flat ground, which necessitated the construction of a substantial frame to form the cavea.

=== Cavea ===
Externally, the semicircular cavea had three tiers of arcades; restoration has partially revealed only two. Each floor consists of a series of arcades framed by Doric pilasters. The arcades are supported by massive masonry pillars decorated with smooth Corinthian pilasters. The 24 arcades on the first level gave access on either side of the hemicycle to two vomitorium (vomitoria) that sloped gently down to the orchestra, and to a gallery that ran around the cavea from one vomitorium to the other. This gallery served the interior of the cavea via 25 vaulted entrances: six entrances opened onto the staircases leading to the upper gallery, which in turn served the 5 vomitoria giving access to the tiers; six other entrances led to an interior corridor at ground level, the ends of which connected the lateral vomitoria. Finally, the thirteen remaining entrances led to rooms of indeterminate use, perhaps service rooms for theatrical equipment or spectator rooms.

La cavea
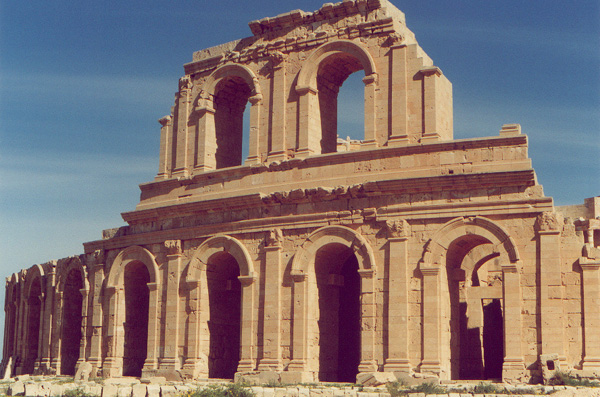
Exterior, two of the three levels of restored arcades.

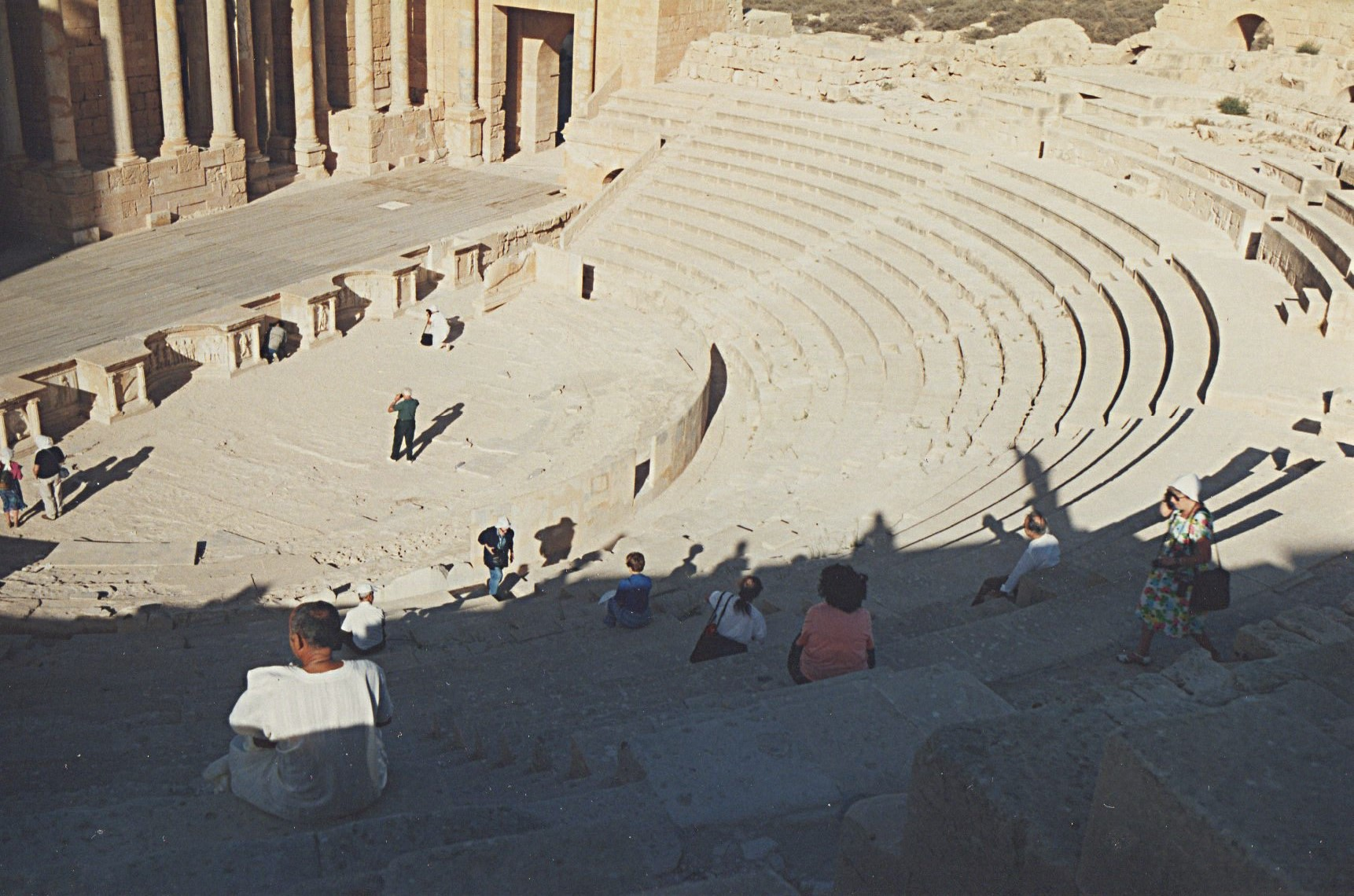
Orchestra and cavea.

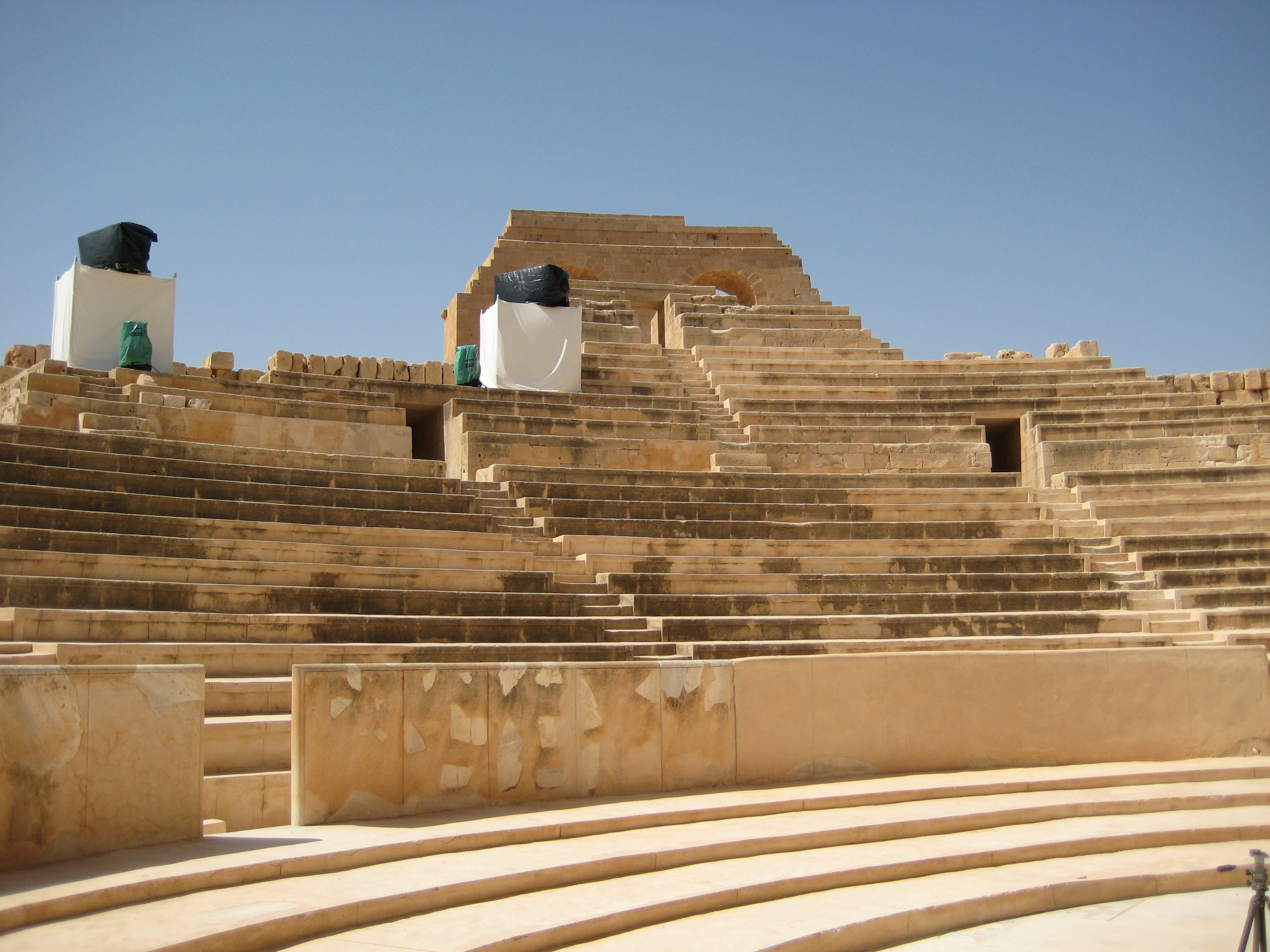
Two levels of seating, the Ima Cavea and the Media Cavea.

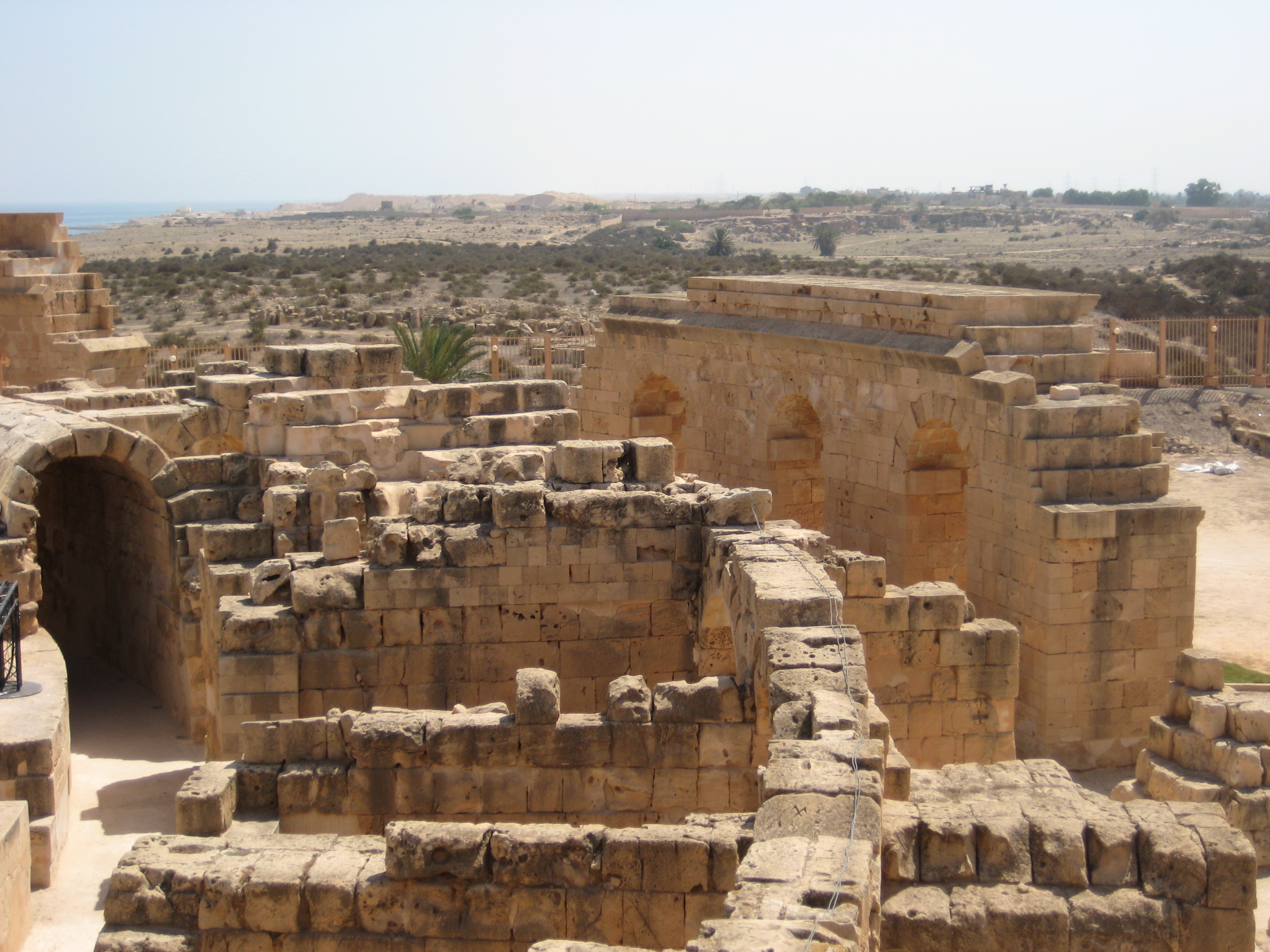
Third level, interior circulation corridor.

Inside, the cavea is classically divided into three levels or maeniana: the lower level (ima cavea), in good condition, comprises 12 tiers, divided into six radiating sectors (cunei) by seven staircases. The second level (media cavea) has 7 tiers divided into seven sectors, accessed via five vomitories from the semicircular corridor on the second floor. The third level (summa cavea), which has disappeared and whose height would have equalled that of the stage wall, would have had fifteen tiers, made of stone or perhaps wood.

=== Stage wall ===
The stage wall (frons scænæ), over 22 metres high and now practically restored to its original form, is one of the most remarkable parts of the theater, the result of an anastylosis unparalleled in Roman theaters. Archaeologists recovered the base of the wall and most of the columns that once adorned it, and patiently reinstalled 96 columns, most of them original, over three floors. The height of each column made it possible to deduce which floor it was on: 5.54 meters for the first level, 4.90 meters for the second, 3.65 meters for the highest. The columns on the first level are in pavonazzo marble, imported from Phrygia; those on the second level are in white marble; the third level combines pavonazzo and granite columns. Although they are all Corinthian, they vary in appearance: smooth columns, vertically fluted or spiral columns, and even mixed columns, fluted on two-thirds of the shaft and smooth above. While the reassembly of the colonnaded decoration is appreciated by onlookers and most archaeologists, the rear façade, crude and unfinished, is considered by some to be archaeologically implausible and unhappy in appearance.

Reconstructed stage wall
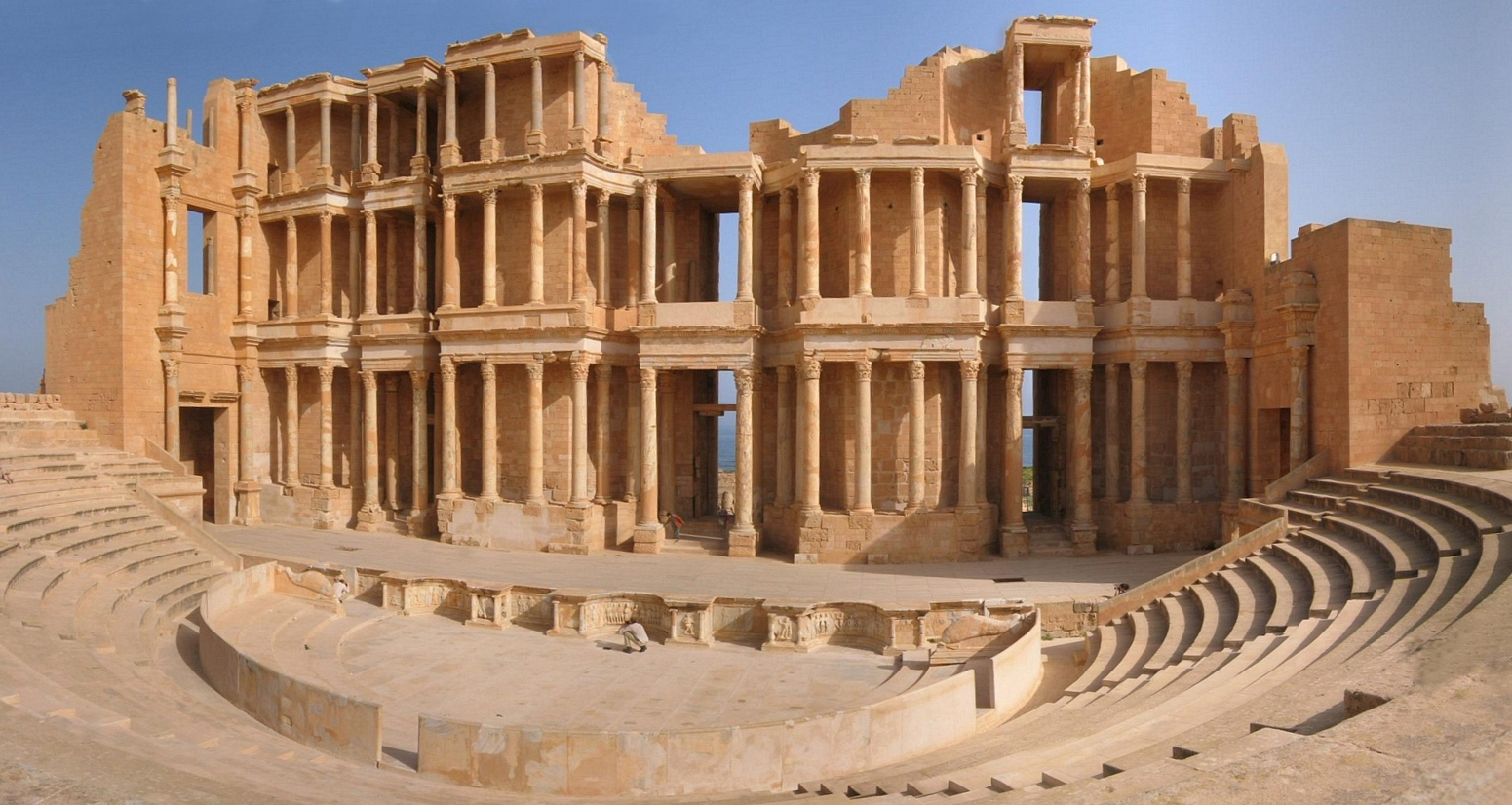
Overall view of the stage wall.

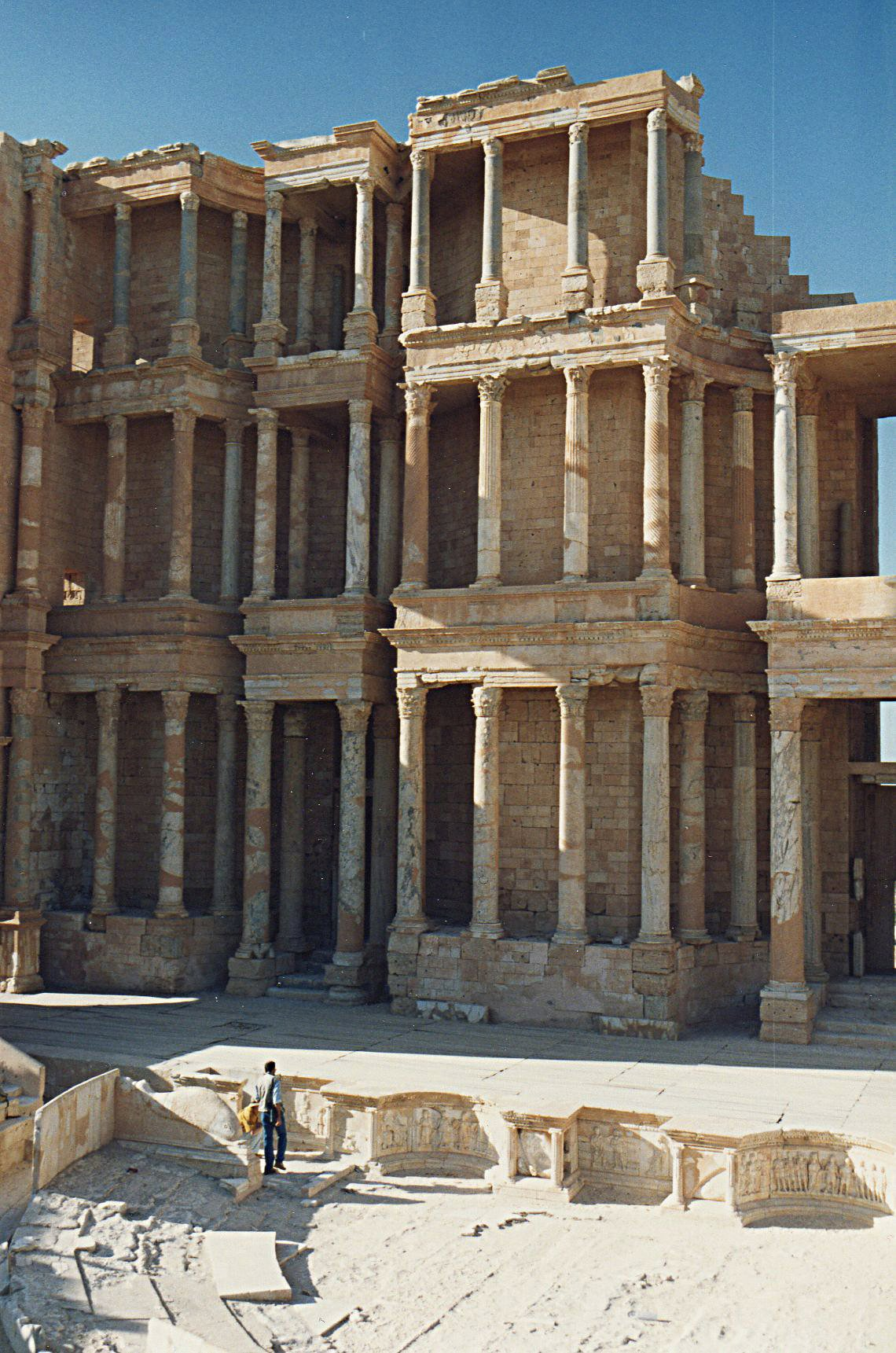
Stage wall, left.

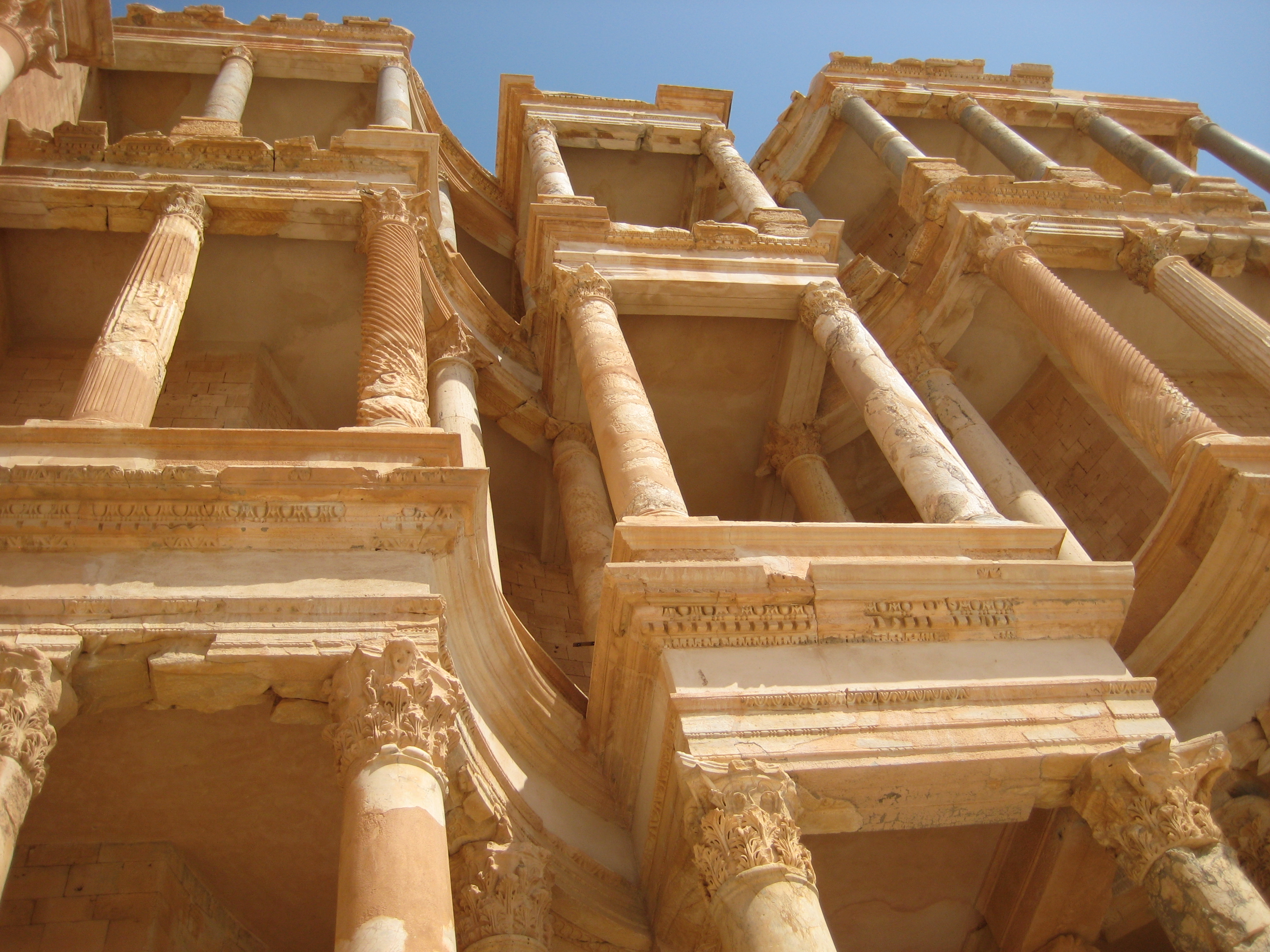
Detail, colonnade of the right guest door.

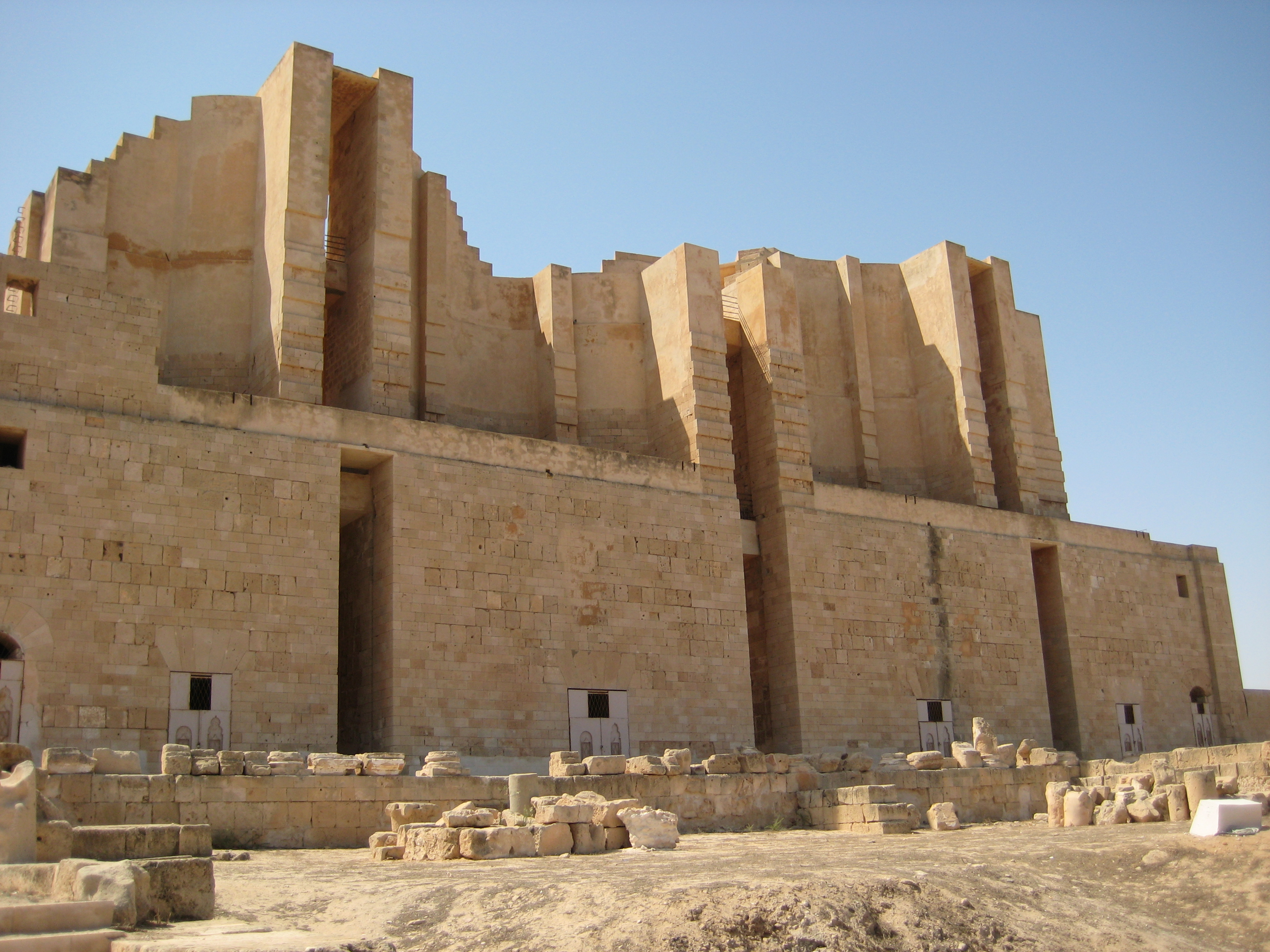
Back of the stage wall.

According to the Roman theater architecture recommended by Vitruvius, the stage wall includes three double doors at the back of large semicircular apses. In the center are the royal doors (valvae regiae), 1.95 meters wide, reserved for the main characters, and on either side are the so-called foreigners' or guests' doors (valvae hospitales), only 1.37 meters wide, for the secondary characters. Each opening is preceded by a columned forecourt that extends the full height of the wall, giving it a monumental appearance.

In this way, the stage wall forms a fixed backdrop for both outdoor scenes, where it forms a street lined with columns, and indoor scenes, where it forms a palace.

Finally, like the frons scænæ in the ancient theater of Orange, the ones in the ancient theater of Sabratha are a typical example of those derived from the architectural canons of Asia Minor, and later developed and perfected by the Romans.

=== Stage and orchestra ===
The stage measures 42.70 by 8.55 meters, with a height of 1.38 meters above the orchestra. It was covered with a wooden floor, which accentuated the sound. Actors gained access either through three monumental doors in the stage wall, or from large side rooms serving as backstage areas, through doors known as "forum side" and "country side", the equivalent of the modern "courtyard side" and "garden side". These rooms also communicated with the cavea's semicircular corridor. They were luxuriously paved with polychrome marble, and their walls were veneered with white marble. Fragments of marble found by archaeologists have been glued back onto the wall.

Restored scene, on floor
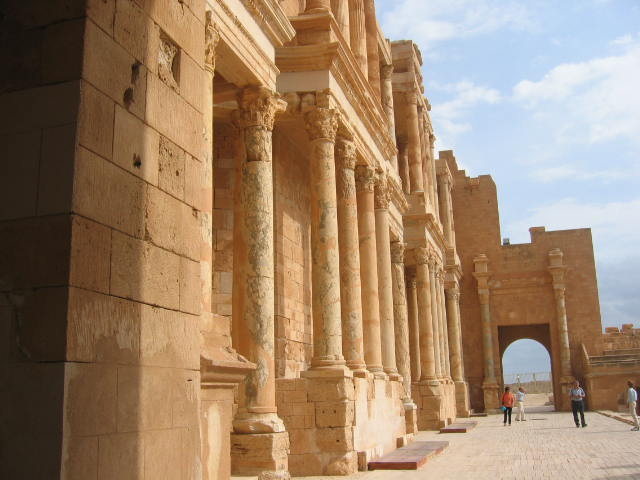
View in enfilade.

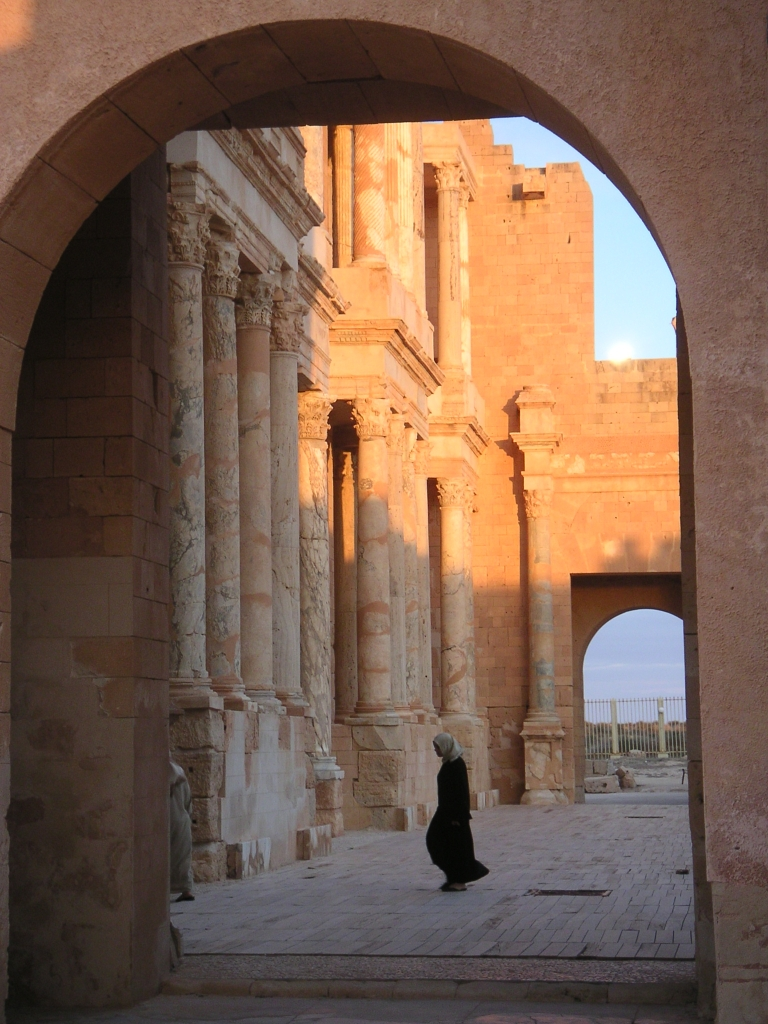
Between the forum side and the country side.

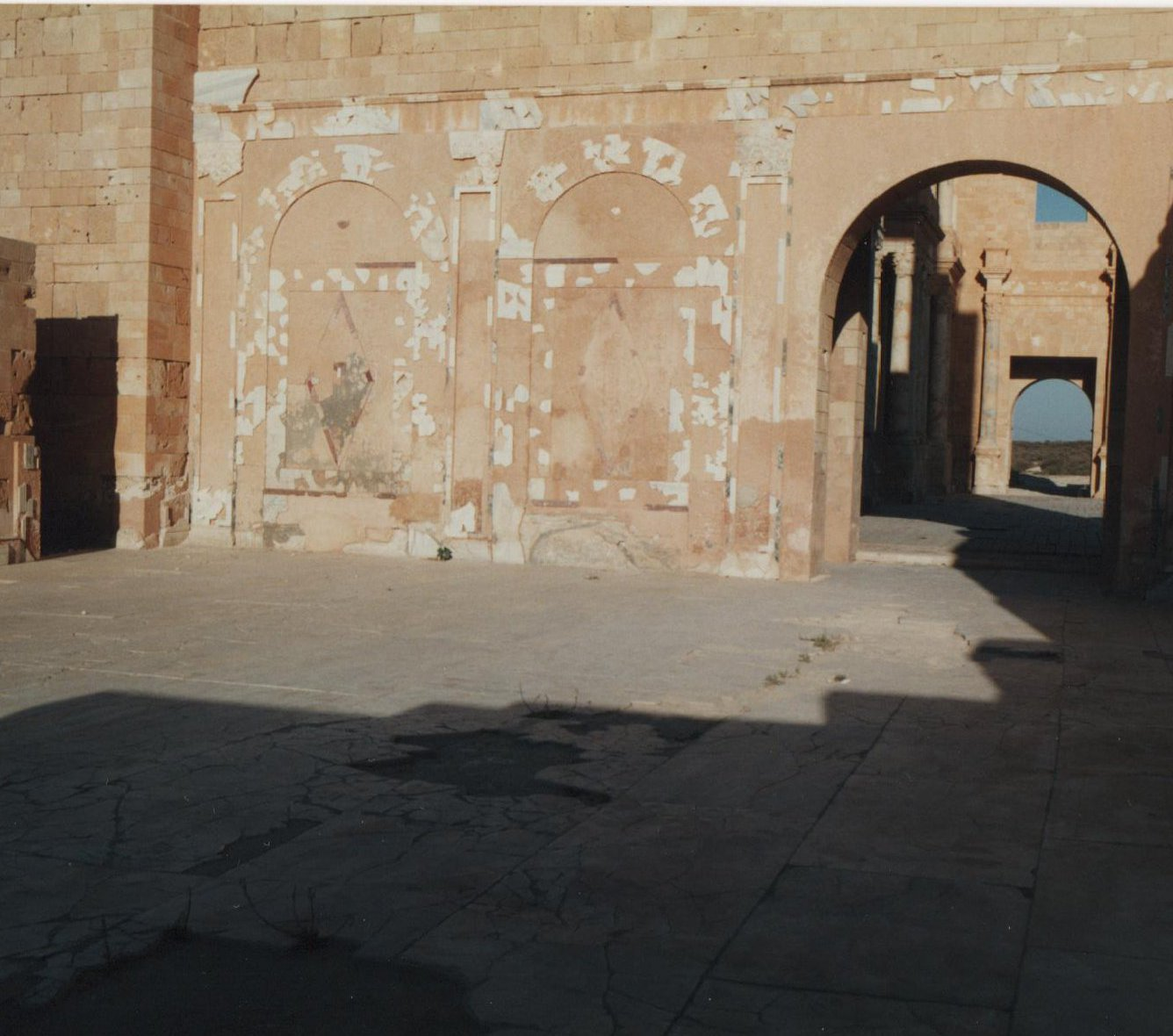
Lateral room, "forum side".

Under the stage floor, a pit with a dirt floor (the hyposcenium) was accessible via an eleven-step service staircase. Stagehands could stand in this basement, which was dug out more than a metre from the orchestra, and could raise or lower scenery elements or characters through trapdoors opening onto the stage floor. A narrow ditch just behind the pulpitum was used to manoeuvre the stage curtain. A pipe pierced through the pulpitum drained rainwater from the orchestra and cavea, collecting it in a pit in the center of the basement. A second, large-diameter pipe ran from this pit under the stage wall, acting as a spillway and preventing flooding of the basement in the event of a heavy downpour.

The orchestra, a semicircular space between the stage and the cavea, is still almost completely covered with its original paving, made of marble imported from Proconnese. Four low, wide tiers were reserved for movable seats for the notables. They accessed the orchestra directly via the two lateral vomitories (aditus maximi), terminated by barriers depicting sculpted dolphins. A 1.50-metre-high balustrade surrounded these reserved tiers, isolating them from the cavea.

Orchestra
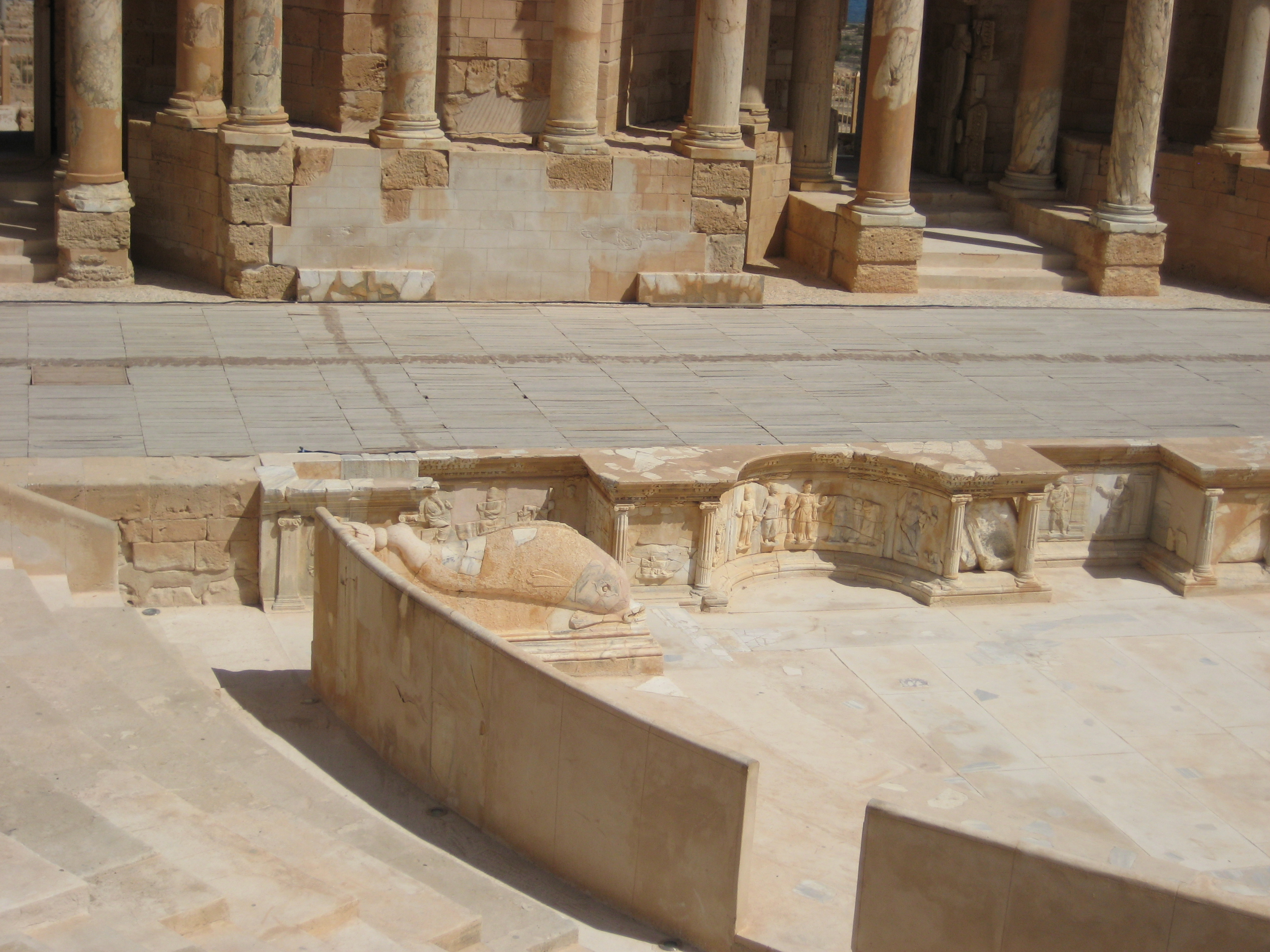
Balustrade separating the orchestra from the cavea.

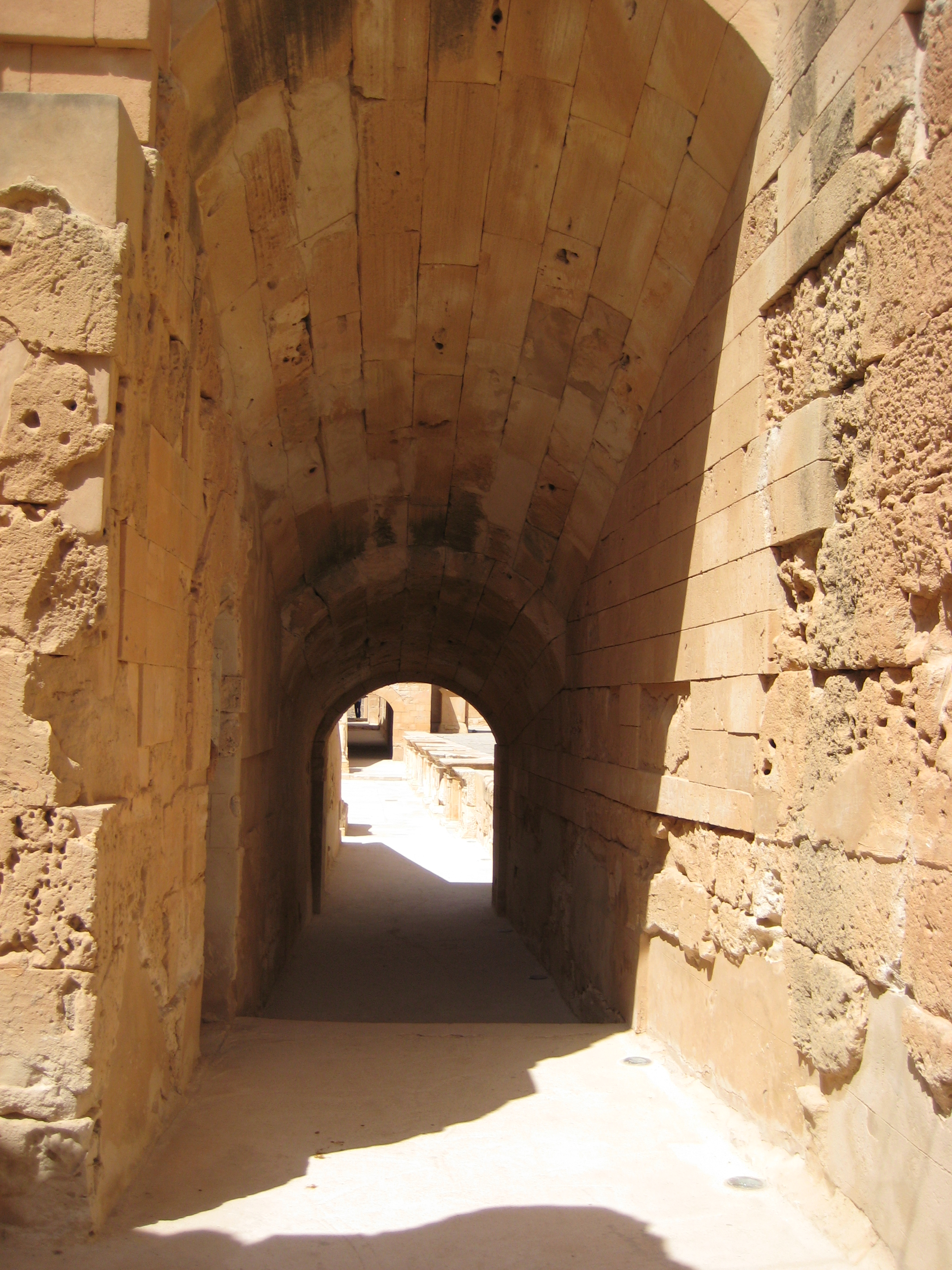
Lateral vomitorium leading to the orchestra (aditus maximus).

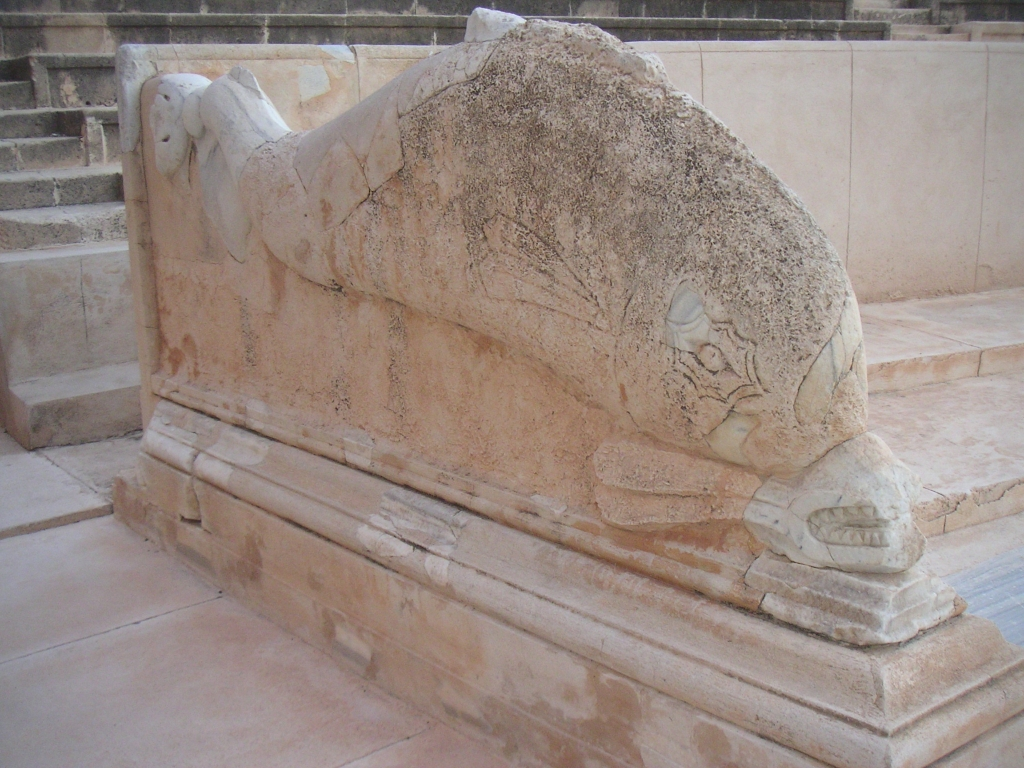
Carved dolphin (reconstituted).

=== Pulpitum ===
The pulpitum, the small wall separating the stage from the orchestra, is divided alternately into three semicircular niches, corresponding to the apses in the stage wall, and four rectangular niches. Each niche is bordered by small projections with a flat face framed by two colonnettes. At each end of the pulpitum, a five-step staircase, concealed by a low wall, leads from the stage to the orchestra. This form, indented by niches, is common and can be found in other theaters in Roman Africa, but the pulpitum in the ancient theater of Sabratha offers exceptional ornamentation after restoration. In fact, the front of the pulpitum is decorated with white marble reliefs in the round, forming a series of tableaux that have been largely reconstructed, and which have no equivalent in other Roman theaters.

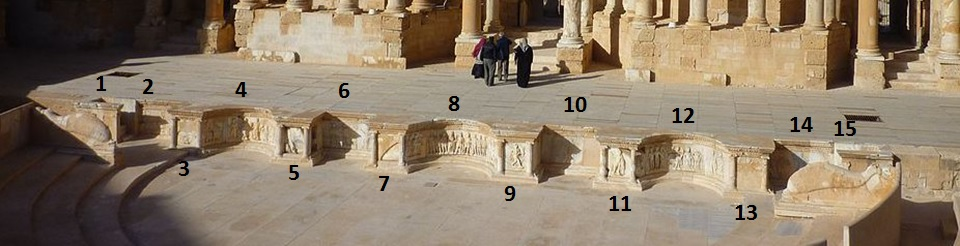
The pulpitum, overview. Numbers refer to the descriptions below.

The themes represented do not form an overall unity: some evoke the various forms of Roman-style theatrical spectacle, while the central motif is a political allegory, and mythological figures fill the intervals. The motifs represented are as follows:

- Forecourt 1, concealing the staircase leading to the stage: two dancers, symmetrical to forecourt 15. The dancers intervene between theatrical sequences.
- Rectangular niche 2: at the back, a group of characters dressed in Greek style are interpreted by Giacomo Caputo, based on their gestures, as a group of declamators or actors, or as debating philosophers. On the right-hand side of the niche, a solar disk on a column, six bound scrolls on a pedestal, an open scroll on a vertical desk
- Only the lower half of the decoration remains in forebody 3. A figure leans on a wheel set on a rock. This attribute symbolizes Fate, personified here by Fortuna or the goddess Nemesis.
- Semicircular niche 4: the nine Muses, recognizable by the attributes they hold: in the center Melpomene, muse of Tragedy, with a helmet and the club of Heracles, heroic symbols; to Melpomene's right, Erato, inspirer of lyric poetry, with a lyre; Clio without distinctive sign; Terpsichore, muse of dance holding a plectrum; Calliope, muse of epic poetry; to Melpomène's left, Thalia, symbol of Comedy with a comic mask; Euterpe the musician and her double flute; Urania, muse of Astronomy, holding the terrestrial globe and Polyhymnia, reduced to a minimum.
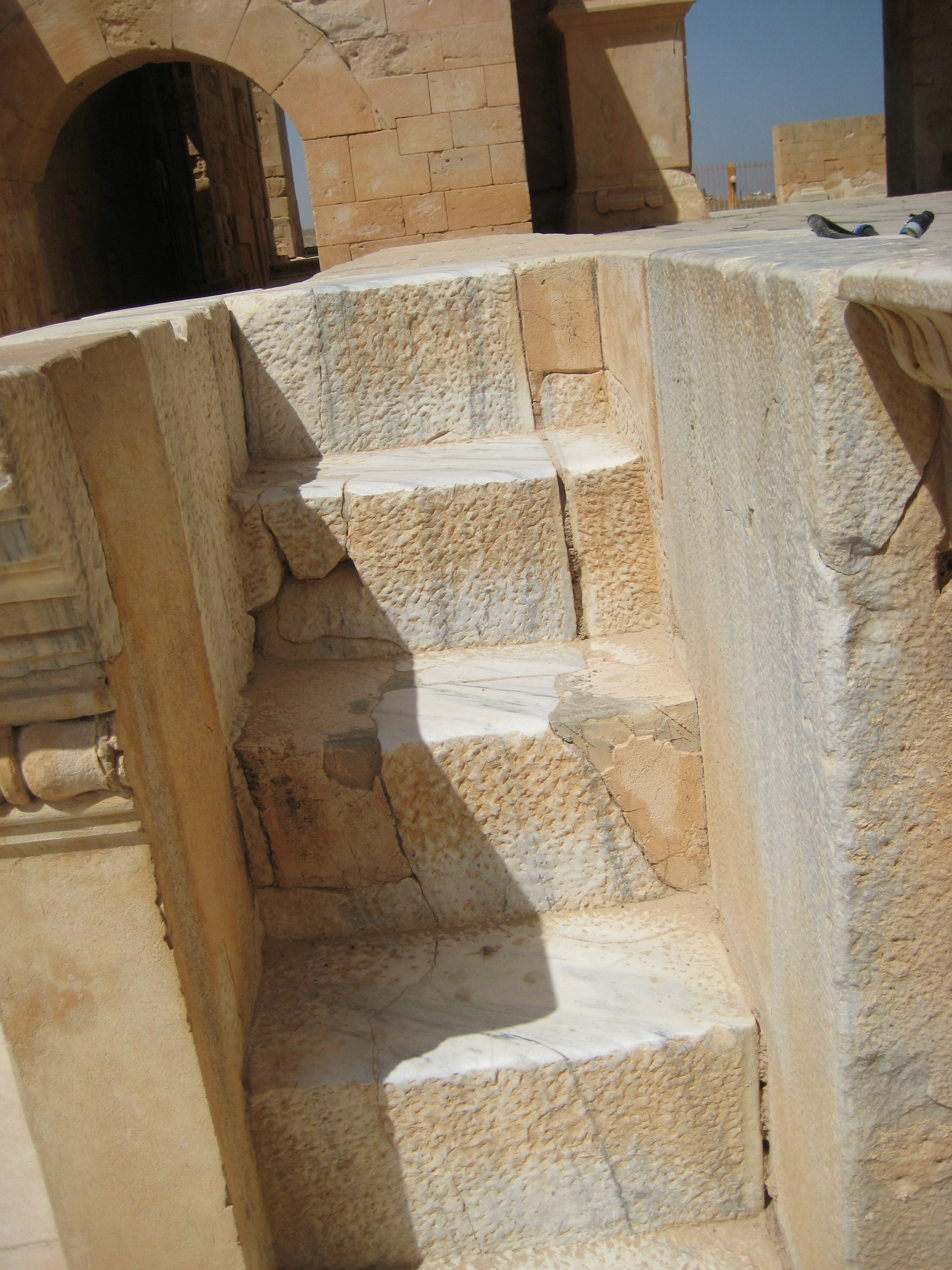
Behind forecourt 1, the staircase leading to the stage.

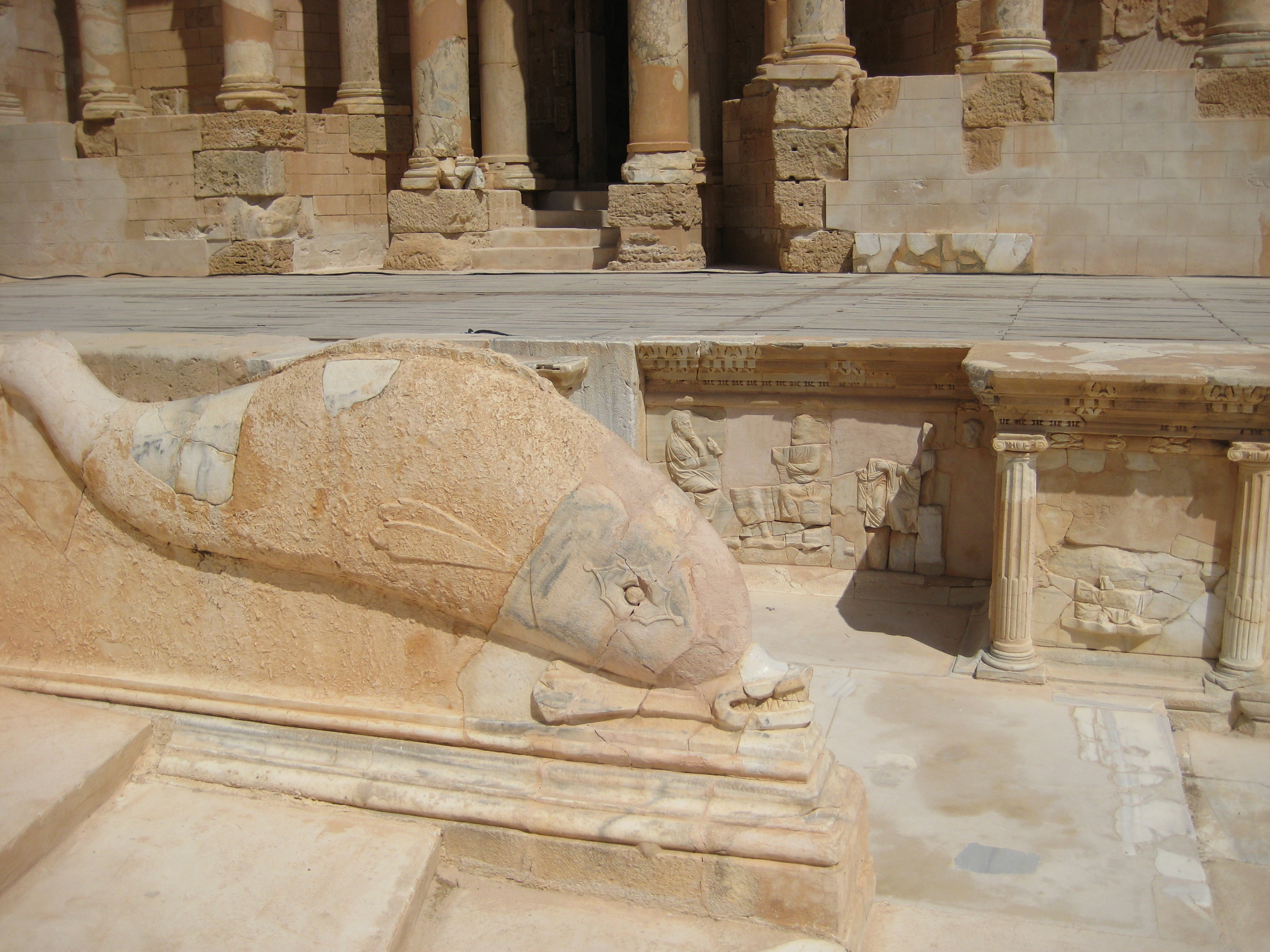
Niche 2 (back): Group discussing.

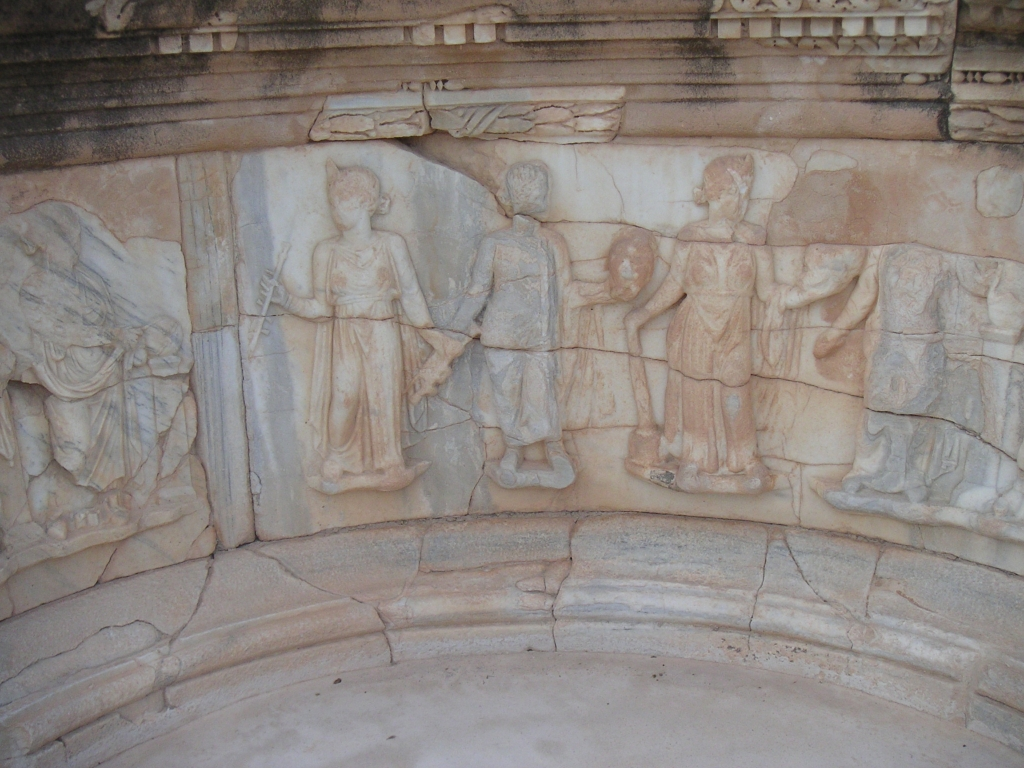
Niche 4: the Muses, left side of the group.

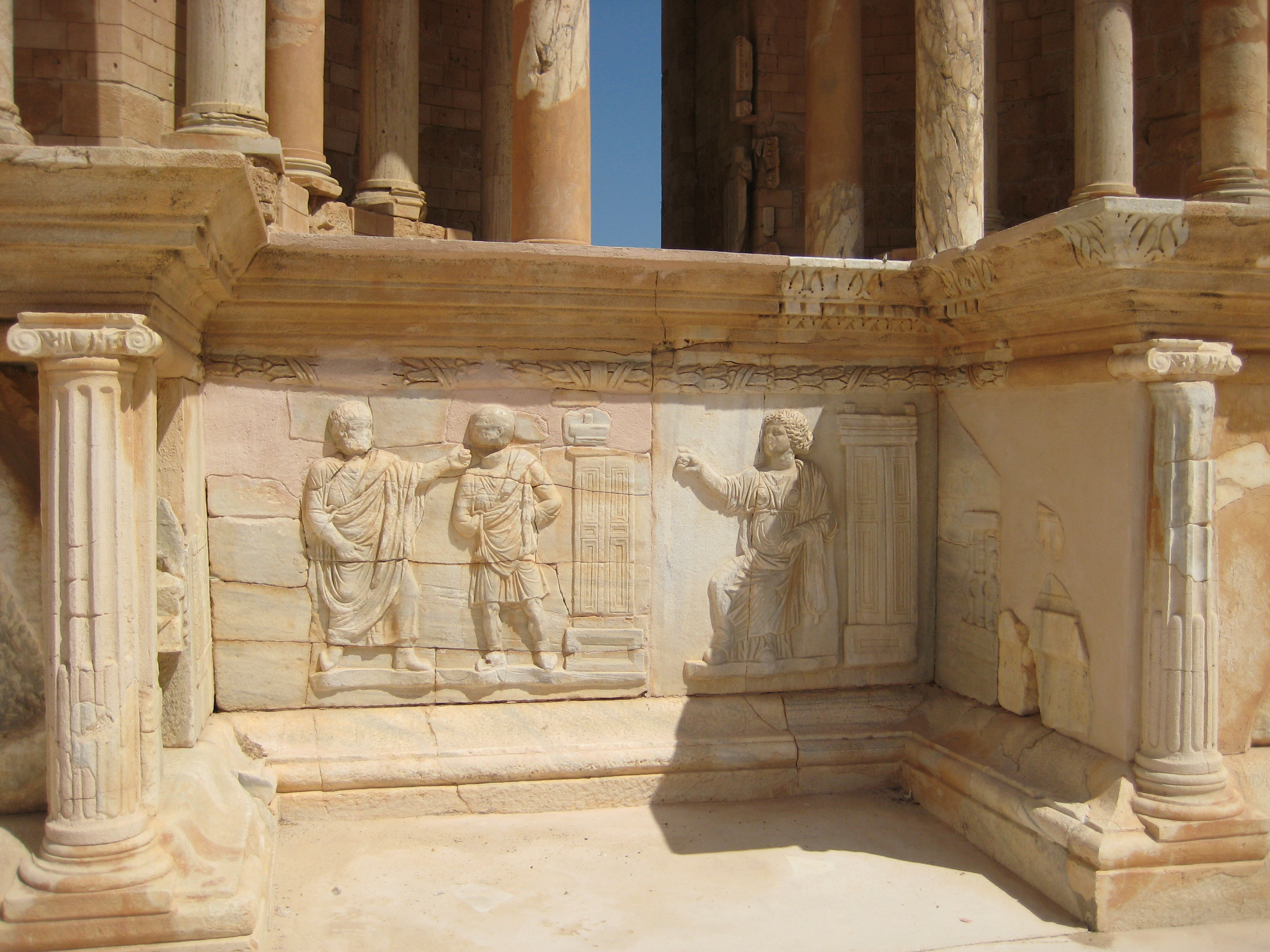
Niche 6: mime scene

- Forebody 5: severely deteriorated, retaining only the foot of a draped figure;
- Rectangular niche 6: on the left side, severely damaged, a basket and part of an armchair. At the far end, a set with two double doors recalls the stage wall of a theater; according to Guidi, a pantomime play is evoked, as the actors are not wearing masks: a seated woman points at a grotesque old man with a shaved head who is hiding something under his coat. Another man, bearded and wearing a toga, also points with his outstretched arm. According to Guidi, the old man is the stupidus (the idiot), a recurring character in mimes. Perhaps he is playing a thief caught red-handed; the reliefs on the right side of the niche are badly altered, with only a tripod table and an altar visible.
- Avant-corps 7: relief not reconstructed
- Semi-circular niche 8: In the center, a woman wearing a crown in the shape of a tower and holding a cornucopia is the personification of the city of Sabratha; she shakes hands with an allegory of Rome, represented as a conqueror, helmeted, leaning on a round shield and wearing a short Amazon tunic. These two women are surrounded by a hedge of helmeted soldiers who raise their right hand, palm open, while in their left hand they hold a short sword, pointing upwards. This scene may represent Sabratha's allegiance to its patron Rome. On either side, two sacrificial scenes underline the solemnity of the central ceremony: on the right, a bearded officiant pours a libation on an altar, assisted by a young man. Archaeologists who date the construction of the theater, or at least the completion of its decoration, to the reign of Septimius Severus, suggest that Septimius Severus should be seen officiating, assisted by his son Caracalla and the latter's father-in-law, Plautian. On the left, a bull leads the sacrifice, next to an altar laden with offerings of fruit, wafers and pine cones. Homer evokes a similar solemnity, consecrating the truce between the Trojans and Achaeans, with the blood of lambs, the pure wine of libations and the clasping of right hands.
Niche 8: Sabratha's allegiance to Rome
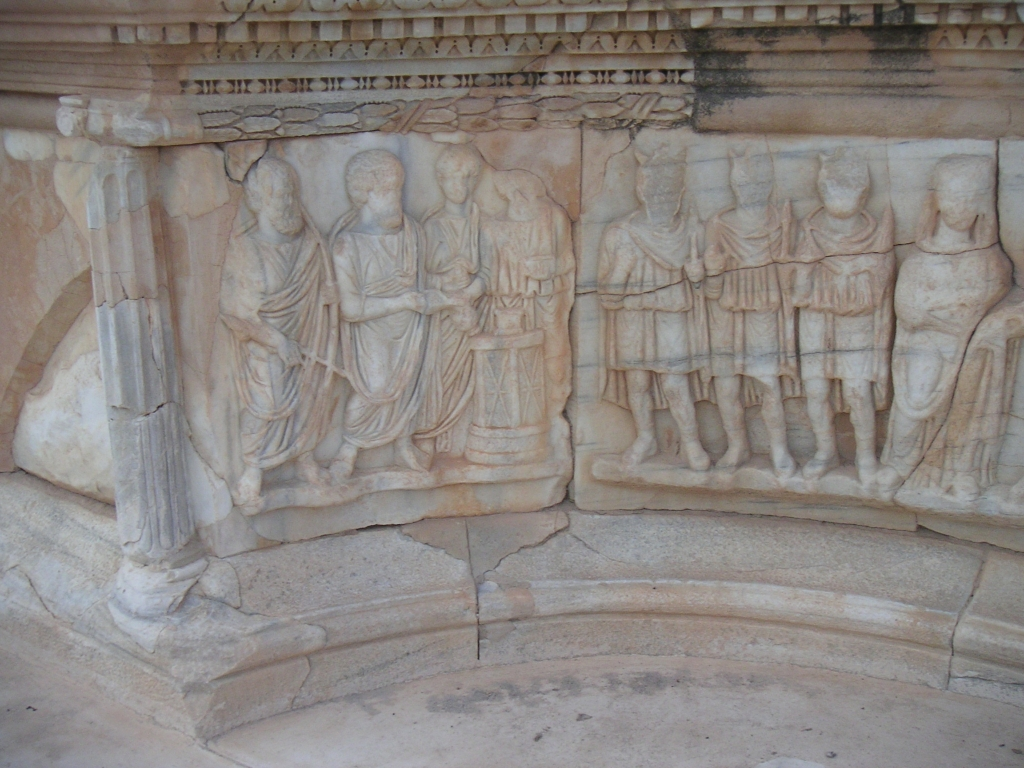
Libation offering.

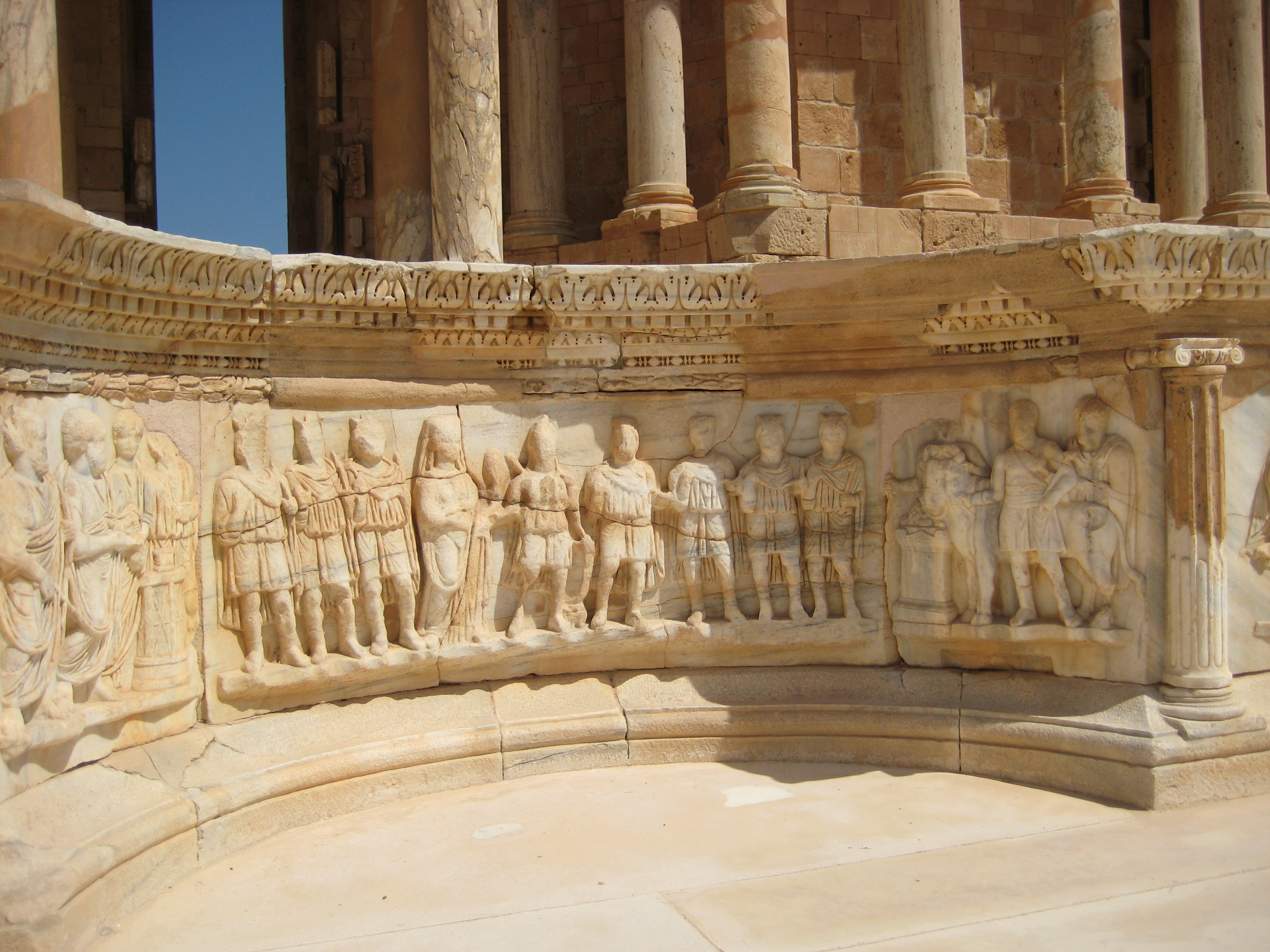
Sabratha and Rome surrounded by soldiers.

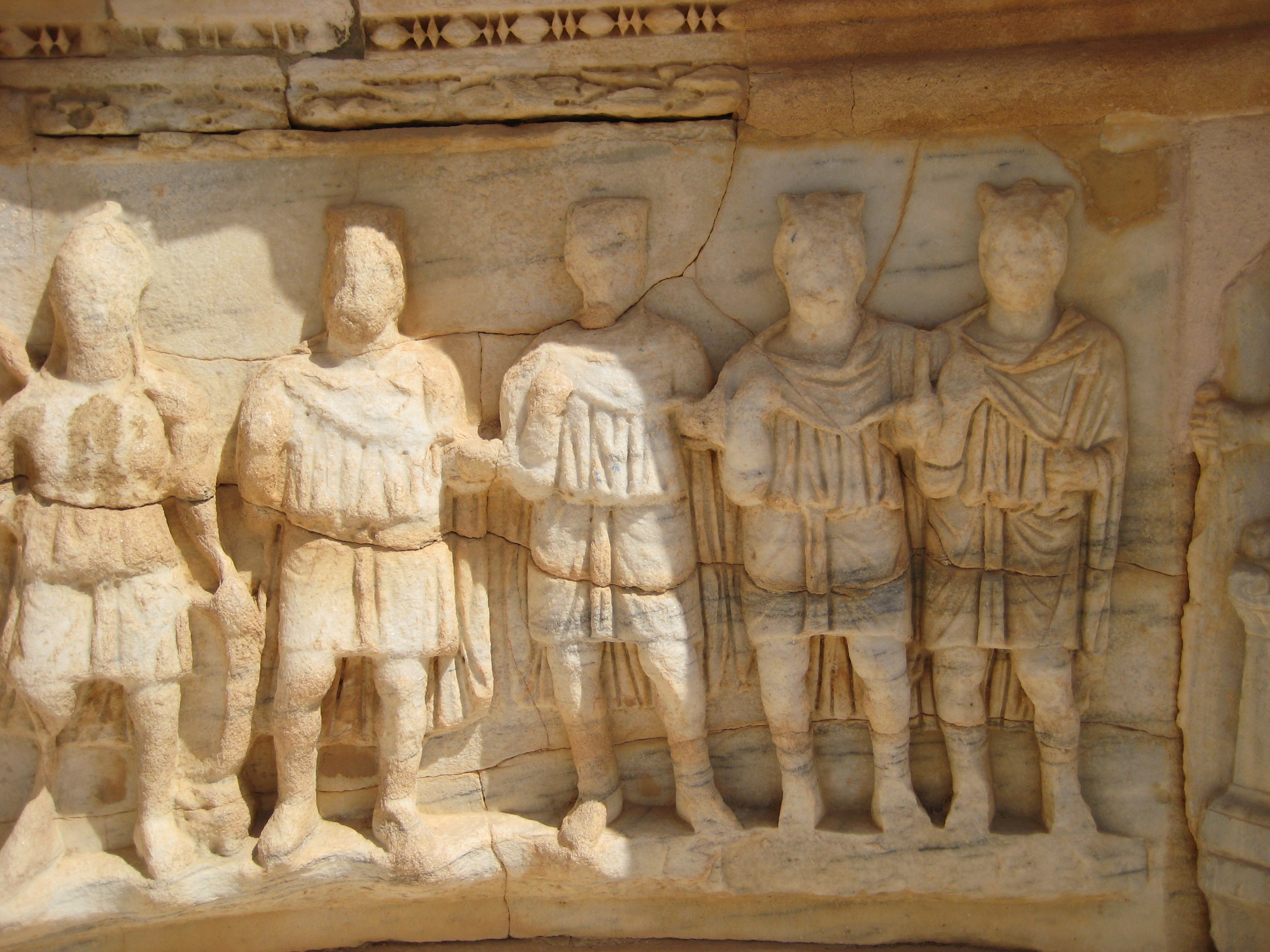
Soldiers' hedge.

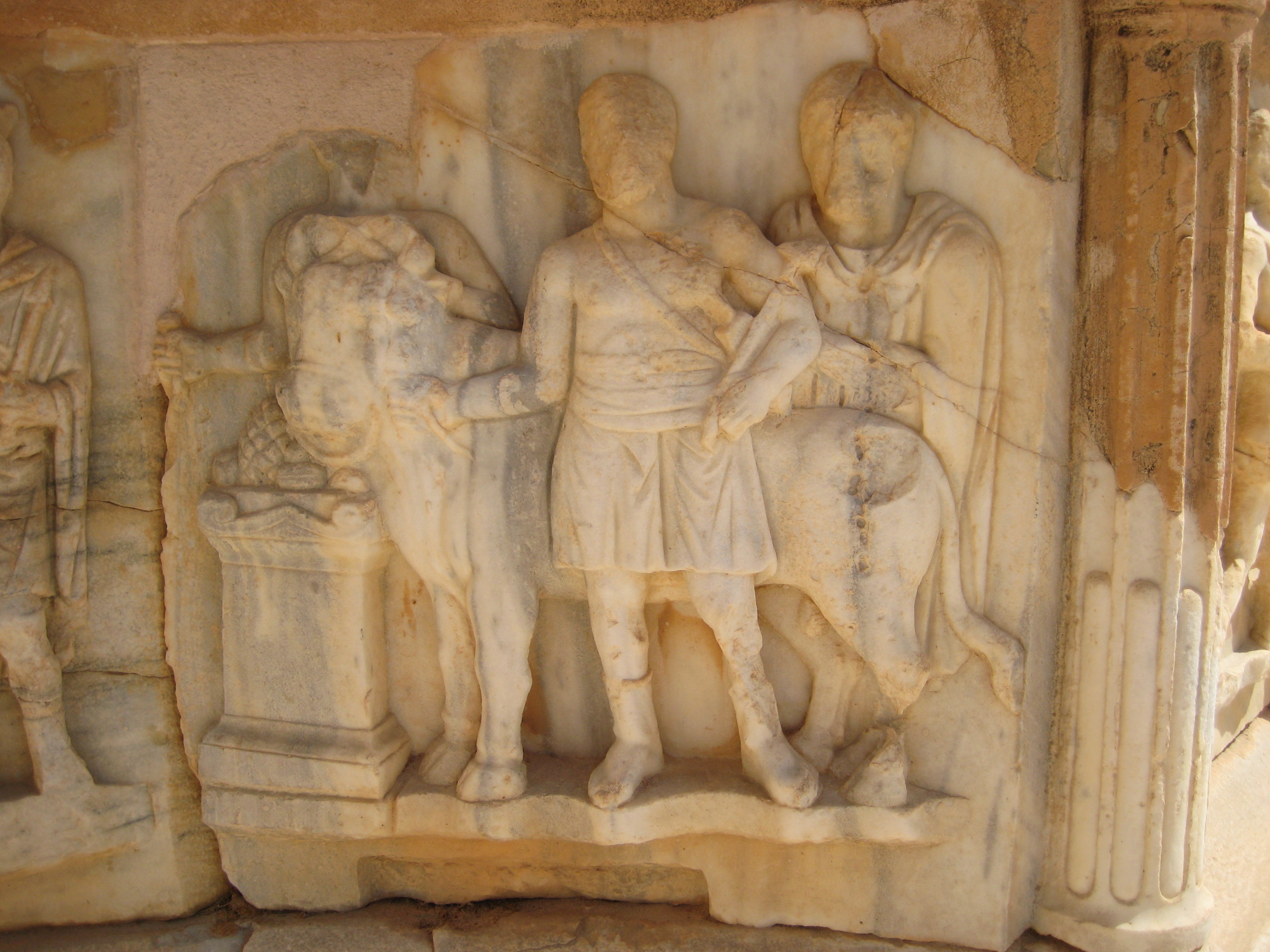
Presentation of the bull to be sacrificed.
- Foreground 9: Mercury walks, caduceus in hand, and carries the infant Dionysus in the folds of his cloak, to shield him from Hera's wrath.
- Rectangular niche 10: on the sides, two tragic masks on the right, a tragic mask and a comic mask on the left. On the back panel, Guidi sees a scene of tragedy, with two figures dressed in chiton and cloak, wearing buskins and masks, one bearded and resting his hand on a club, the other beardless. Caputo identifies the owner of the club as Heracles, the other, younger figure being his last son Hyllus, whom he asked to light his funeral pyre;
- Façade of forebuilding 11: Hercules wearing his emblematic Nemean lion skin, with bow and quiver at his feet. In his raised hand, he holds a faded object, perhaps a golden apple from the Garden of the Hesperides, picked during one of his twelve labors.
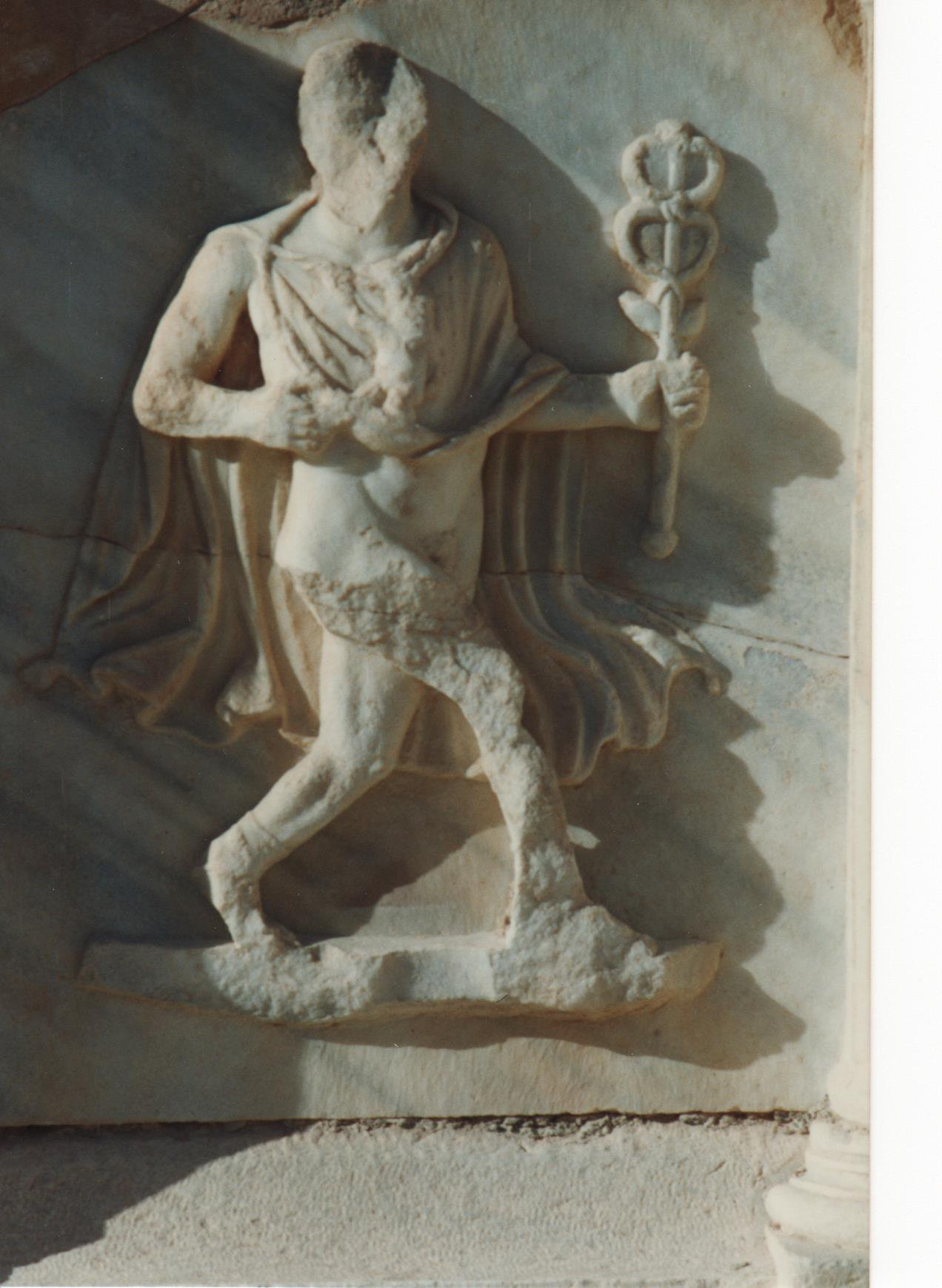
Forebody 9: Mercury carrying Dionysus as a child.

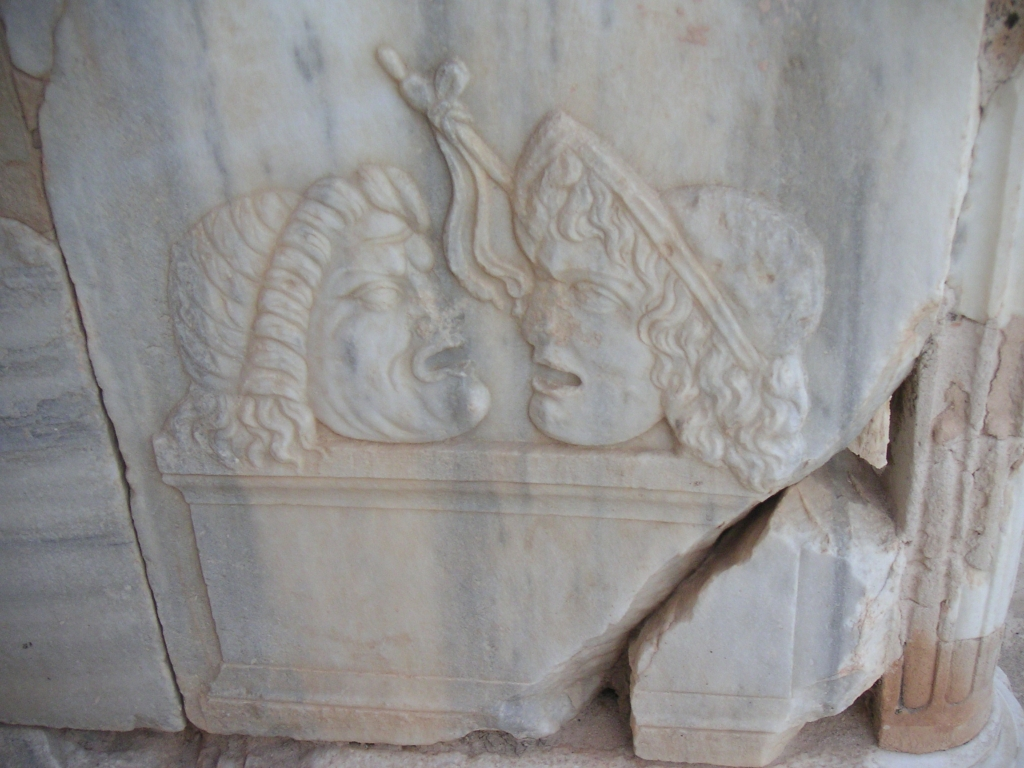
Niche 10, side: theatrical masks, tragic and comic.

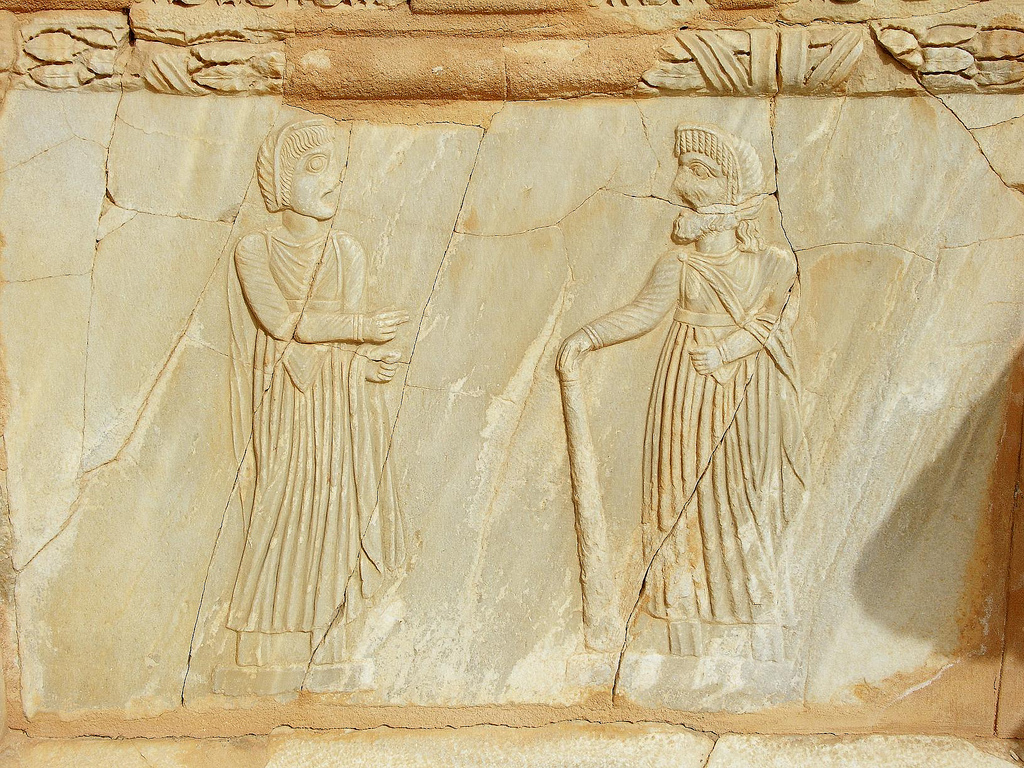
Niche 10, background: tragedy scene, perhaps Heracles and his son.

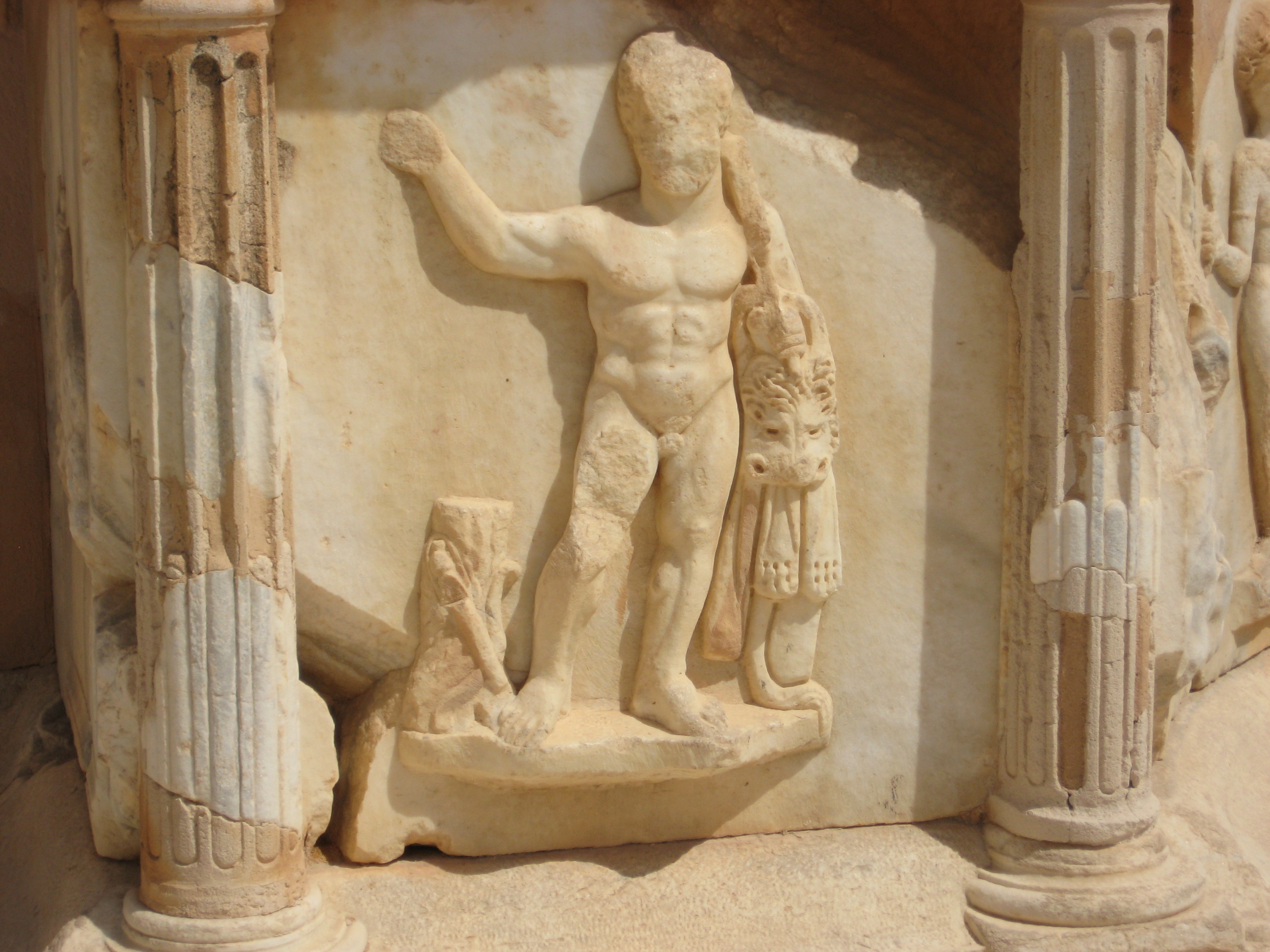
Foreground 11: Hercules holding the skin of the Nemean lion.
- Semicircular niche 12: the Judgment of Paris: the shepherd Paris, wearing a Phrygian cap, holds the apple he will give as a prize to the chosen one. Beside him, Mercury shows the three competing goddesses, Juno draped in a chiton, Minerva helmeted and holding her hand on a large round shield, and Venus naked under a large veil billowing in the wind. To the left of the trio of goddesses, the three Graces, also nude, groom Venus, and a dancing satyr, much worn by erosion;
Niche 12: Paris' judgment
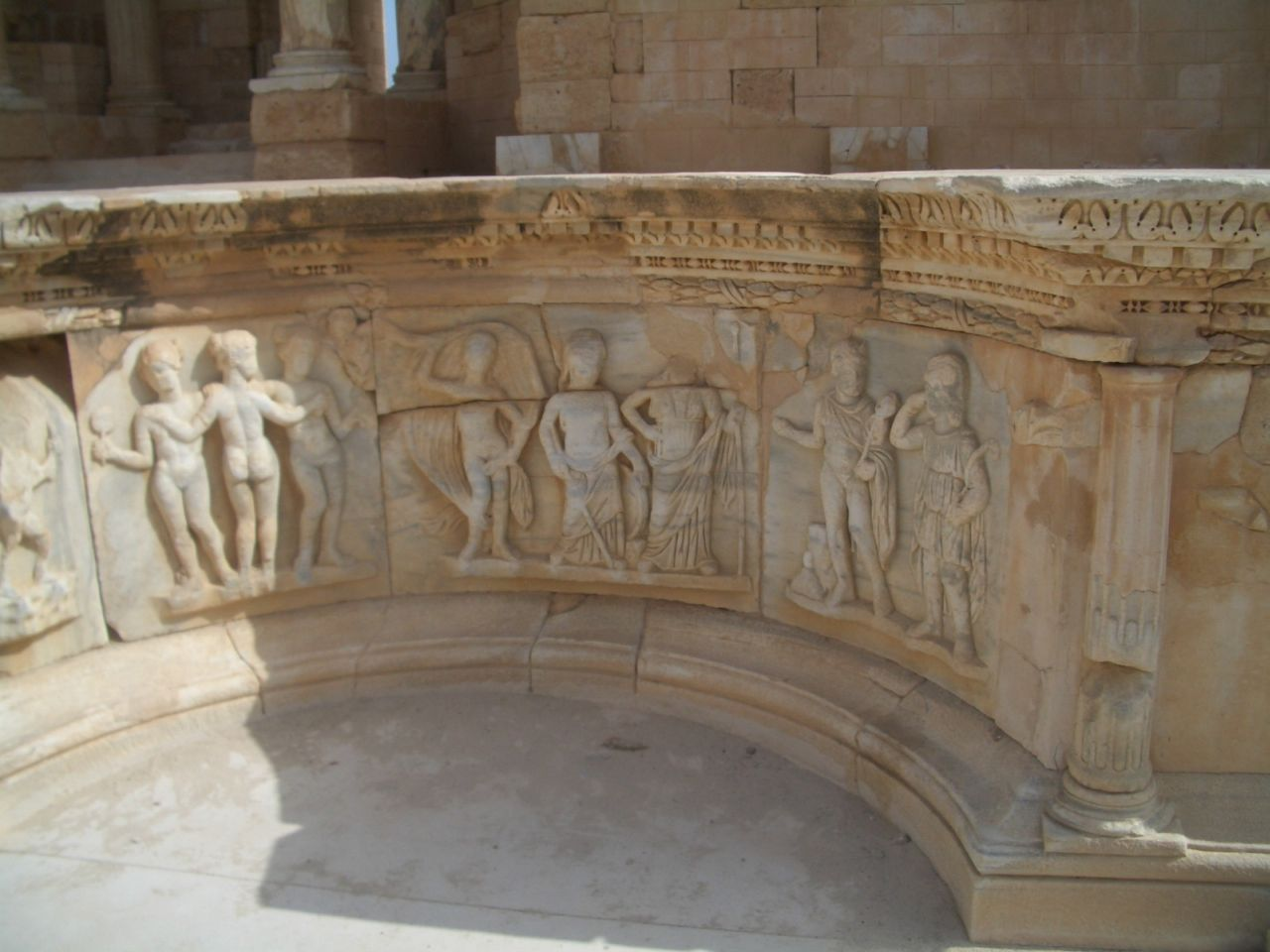
From left to right, the Graces, the Goddesses, Mercury and Paris

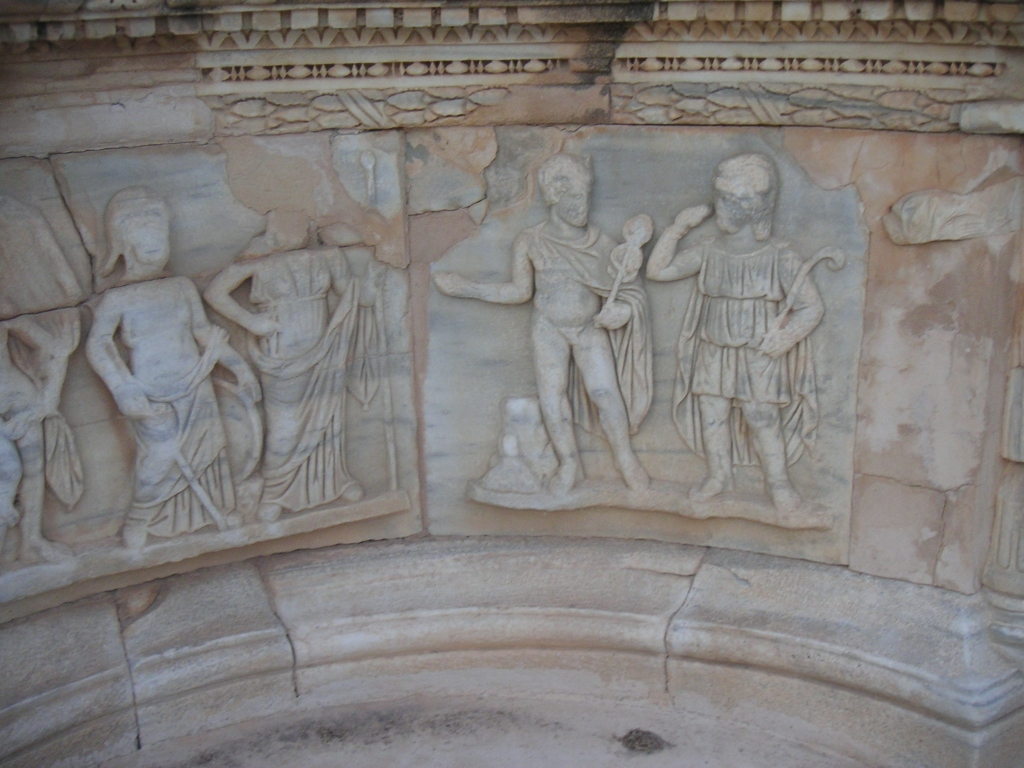
Mercury presents the goddesses to Paris

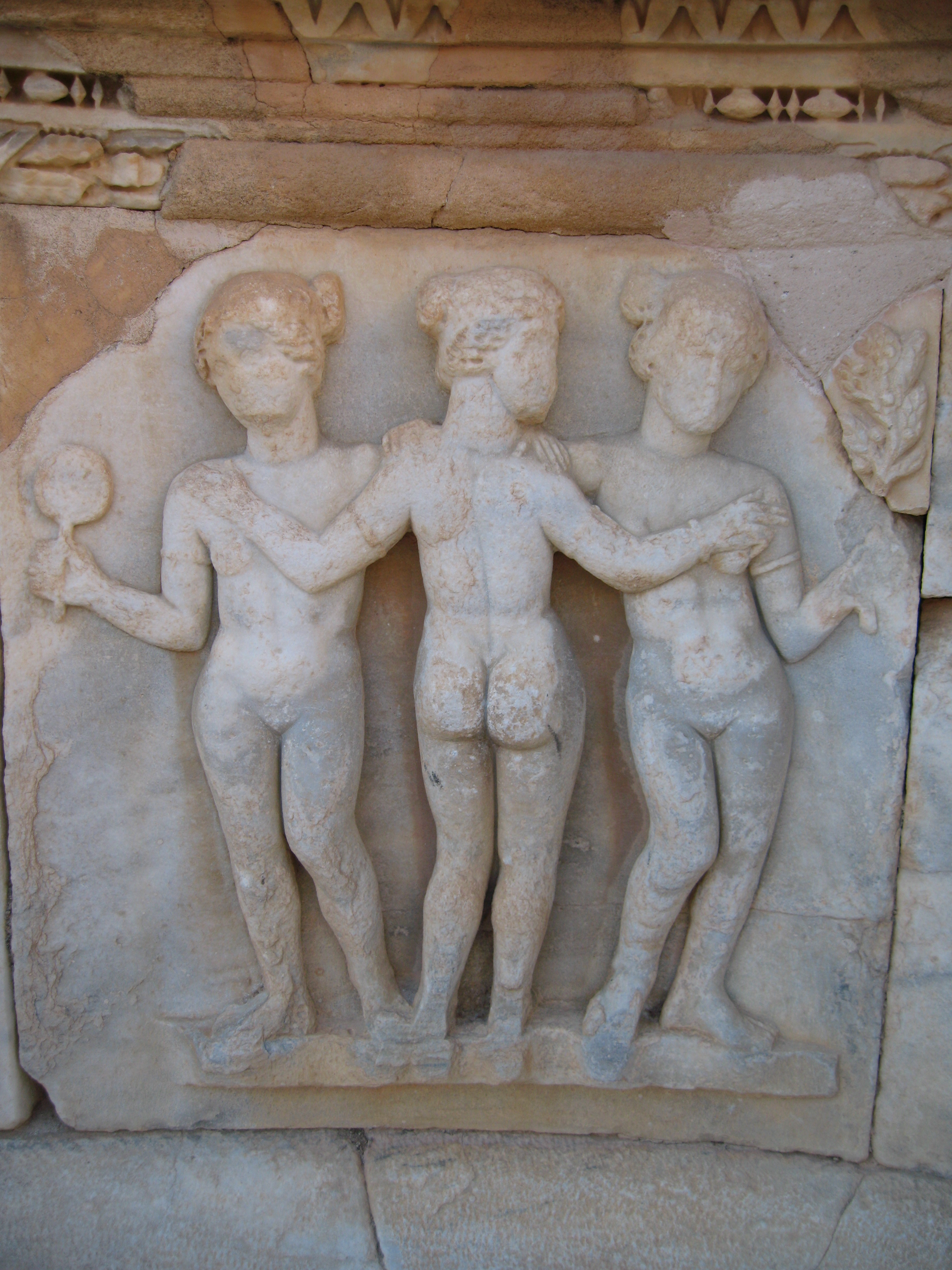
The Three Graces
- Foreground 13: personification of Victory;
- Rectangular niche 14: a tragi-comic pantomime scene, with three characters, one of whom is reduced to a few fragments. This could be the duel between Eteocles and Polynices, two brothers vying for the crown of Thebes, in the presence of their mother Jocasta;
- Foreground 15: symmetrical panel to the first, on which only one of the two dancers remains, twirling and striking crotales.
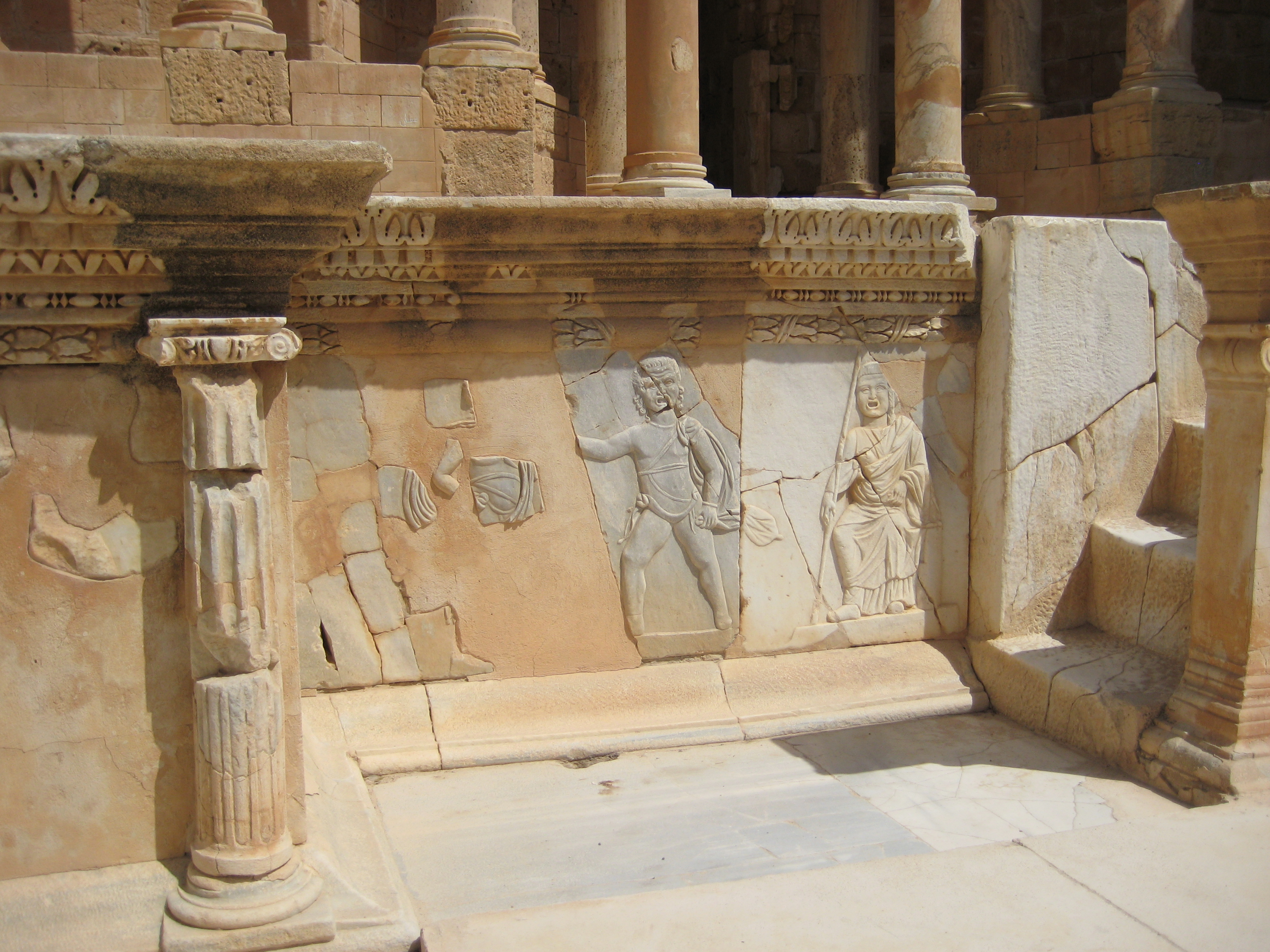
Niche 14: three figures.

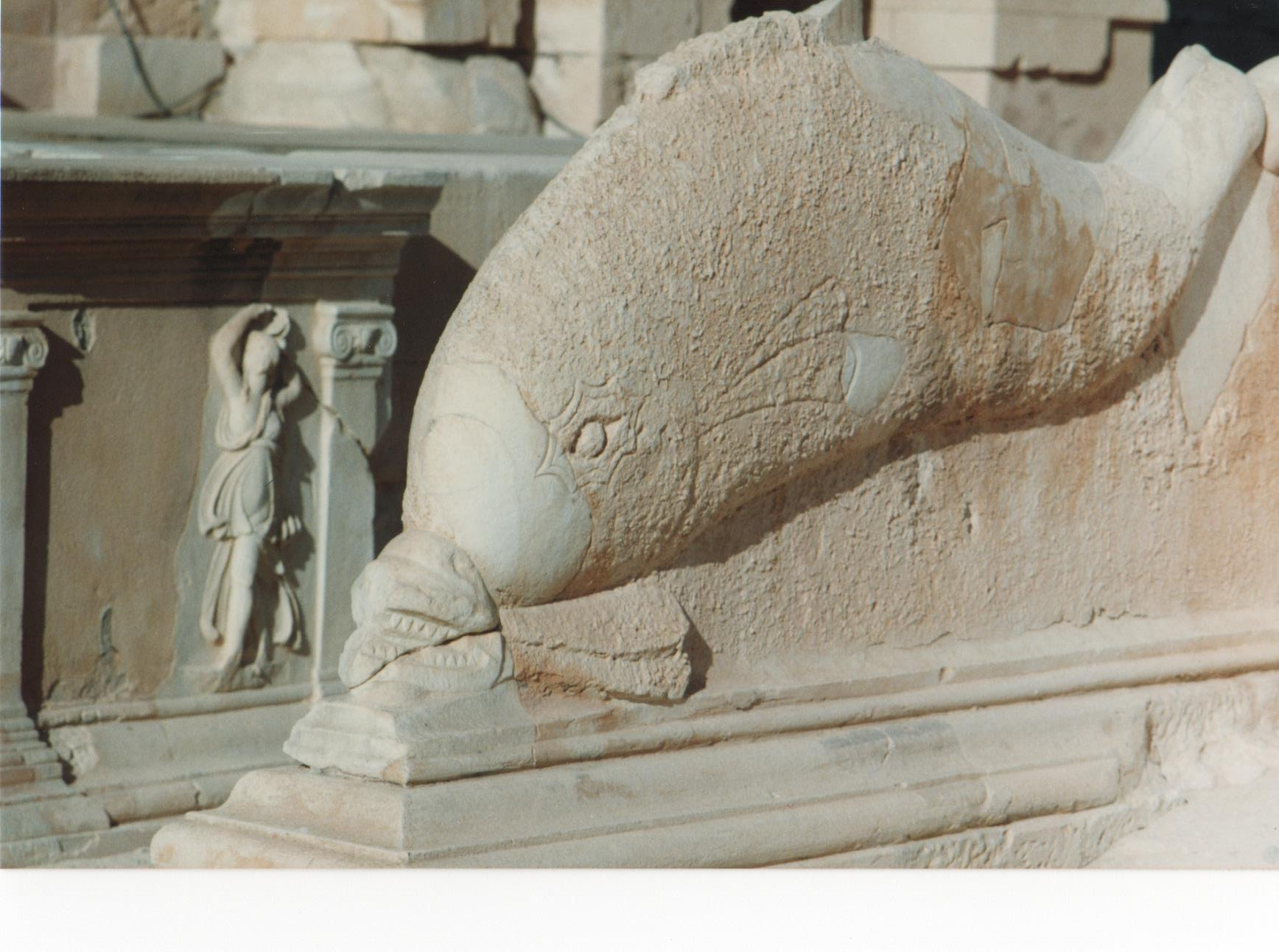
Avant-corps 15: dancer.

=== General dimensions ===
The main dimensions of the theater are as follows:

- Cavea diameter: 92.60 metres;
- Stage:
  - width: 42.70 meters,
  - depth: 8.55 meters,
  - height above orchestra: 1.38 meters;
- Stage wall: 22.75 metres high;
- Orchestra: 25 meters in diameter (22.40 meters for the part occupied by the notables' stands, 15 meters for the open central part).

== Bibliography ==
Documents used as a source for this article:

- Polidori, Robert; Di Vita, Antonino; Di Vita-Evrard, Ginette; Bacchielli, Lidiano (1998). La Libye antique: Cités perdues de l'Empire romain (in Italian). Paris: Editions Mengès. ISBN 2-85620-400-7.
- Lachaux, Jean-Claude (1970). Théâtres et amphithéâtres d'Afrique proconsulaire (in French). Aix-en-Provence: Édisud. BNF: 34643860.
- Caputo, Giacomo (1959). Il teatro romano di Sabratha e l'architettura teatrale africana (in Italian). Rome: L'Erma di Bretschneider.
- Balty, Jean (1961). "Notes de lecture de Il teatro di Sabratha e l'architettura teatrale africana de Ch. Giacomo Caputo". L'Antiquité classique (in French). 30 (1): 323–327.
- Guidi, Giacomo, « Il teatro romano di Sabratha » (in Italian), Africa Italiana, t. III, 1930, Bergame, Istituto italiano d'arti grafiche.
- Cagnat, René (May 1931). "Notes de lecture sur Il teatro romano di Sabratha de Giacomo Guidi". Journal des Savants (in French). 5 (1): 193–199. doi:10.3406/jds.1927.2793.
- Sear, Frank (2006). Roman théâtres: An architectural study. Oxford: Oxford University Press. ISBN 978-0-19-814469-4.
- Sintes, Claude (2004). La Libye antique. Découvertes Gallimard Archéologie (in French). Paris: Gallimard. ISBN 2-07-030207-5.
- Sintes, Claude (2010). Libye antique, un rêve de marbre (in French). Paris: Imprimerie nationale. ISBN 978-2-7427-9349-5.
