= Archaeological Site of Sabratha =

- موقع صبراتة الأثري (Arabic)
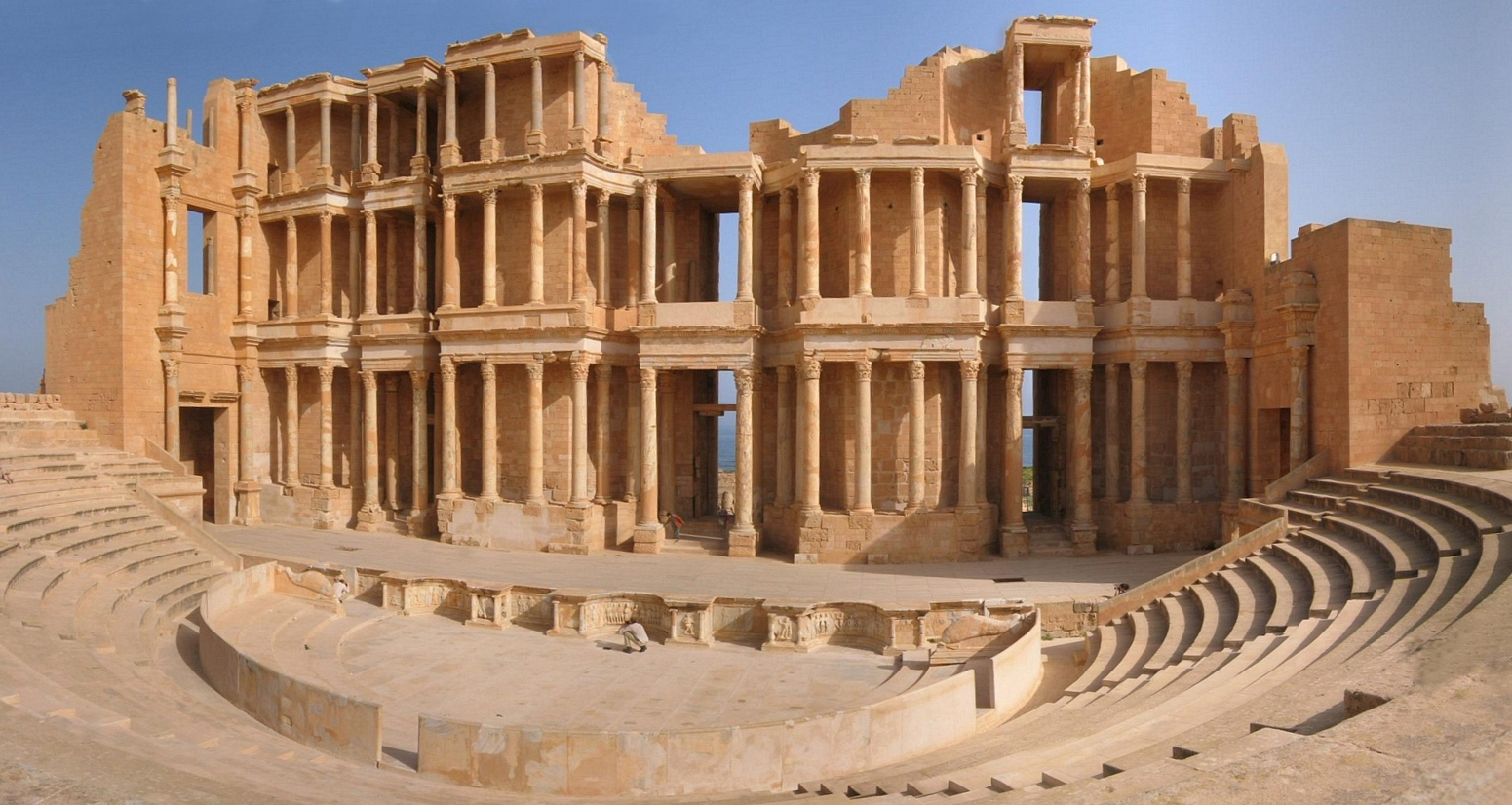
- Theatre of Sabratha

- Location within Libya Location within Africa
- 32°48′19″N 12°29′59″E
- Type: Settlement
- Cultures: Phoenician, Numidia, Roman
- Location: Sabratha, Libya

UNESCO World Heritage Site
- Official name: Archaeological Site of Sabratha
- Type: Cultural
- Criteria: iii
- Designated: 1982
- Reference no.: 184
- Region: North African States

The archaeological site of Sabratha is an excavated Numidian and later Roman city situed near present-day Sabratha, Libya.

It was a Phoenician trading-post that served as an outlet for the products of the African hinterland, and later part of the short-lived Numidian Kingdom of Massinissa before being Romanized and rebuilt in the 2nd and 3rd centuries A.D.

== History ==
Sabratha, on the coast of Libya 40 km, to the west of modern Tripoli, was founded by Phoenician settlers in the sixth or fifth century B.C. and grew to be a prosperous town during much of the Roman period, though it did not long survive the coming of the Arabs in the seventh century A.D. Today it ranks alongside Leptis Magna as one of the major classical sites of the region. The' modern exploration of the ruins was begun in 1926 during the Italian colonial period and in the ensuing years much of the heart of the town was laid bare. During the period of the British Military Administration immediately after the end of the Second World War, three seasons of work were carried out by a British expedition.

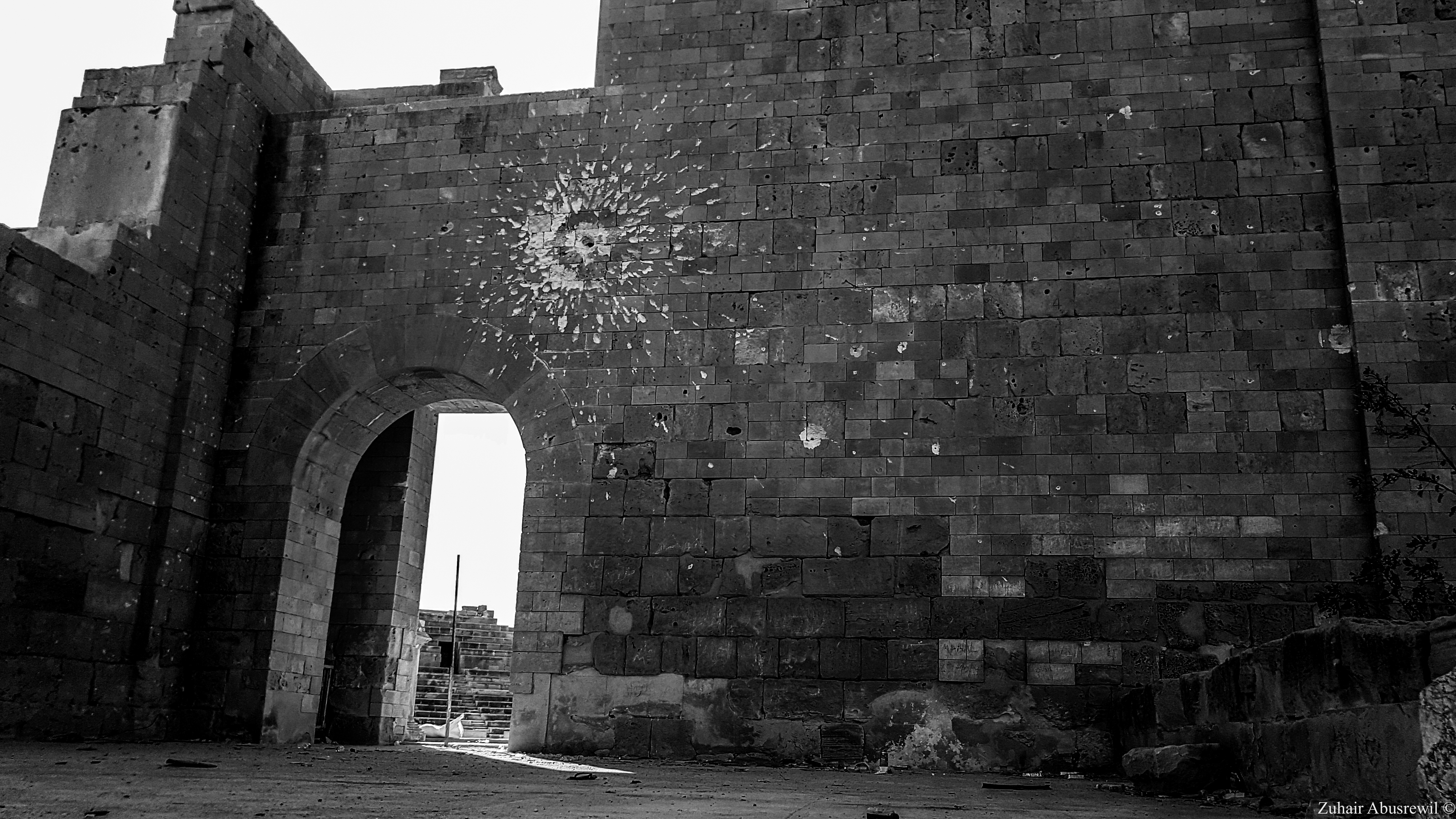
A shell fell on the eastern wall of the Roman theater of the ancient city of Sabratha

=== Damage in 2017 ===
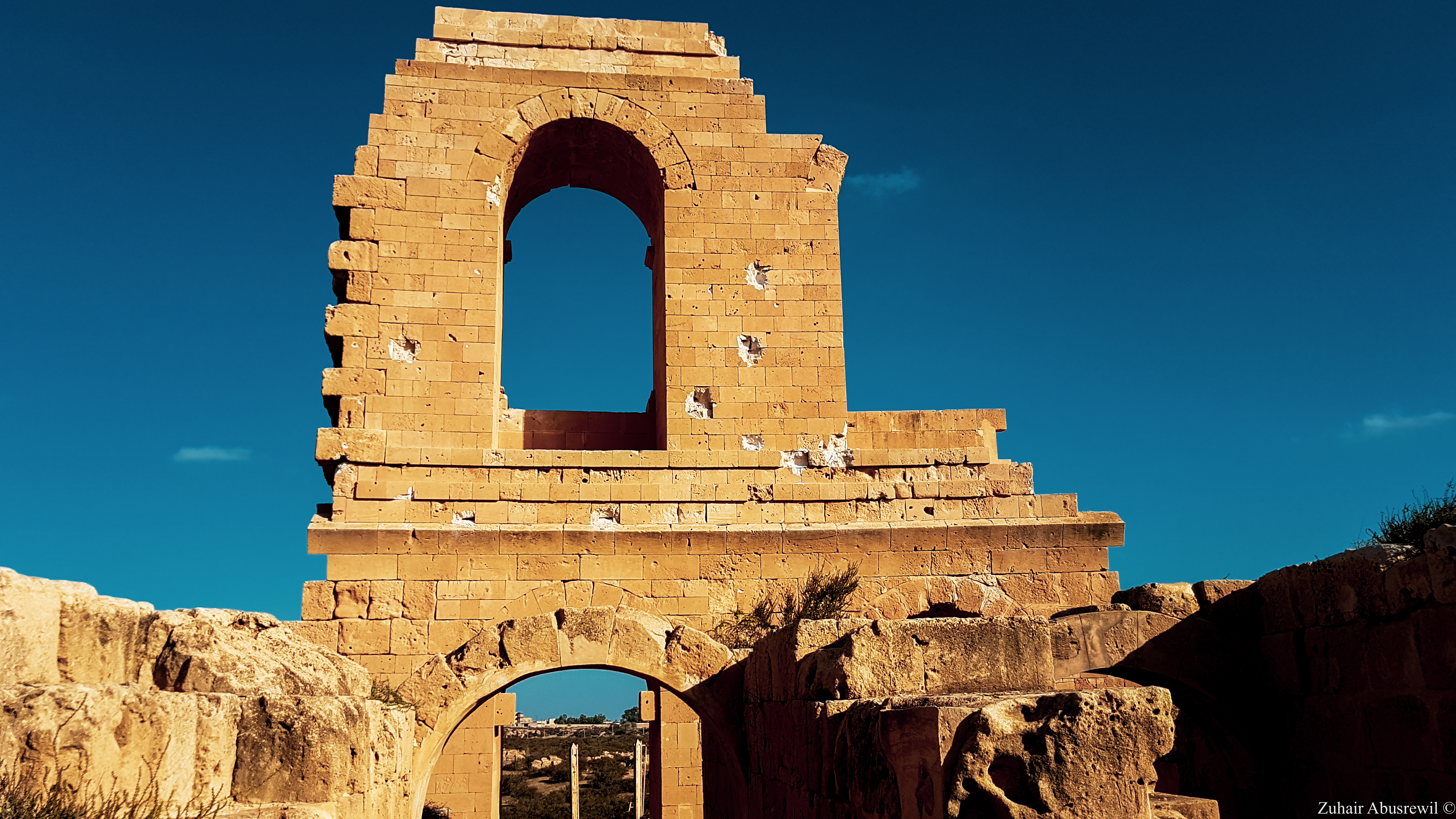
Damage resulting from armed conflict in 2017

Previously, in 2015, it was endengared by ISIS. The site suffered damage resulting from armed conflict in 2017.

== Sources ==
This article incorporates text from a free content work. Licensed under CC BY-SA IGO 3.0 (license statement/permission). Text taken from Archaeological Site of Sabratha, UNESCO World Heritage Centre.
