= María del Rosario Síntes =

Colombian economist and politician

- Born: 20th century Palmira, Valle del Cauca
- Education: University of the Andes
- Occupations: economist, politician

María del Rosario Síntes Ulloa is a Colombian economist and politician.

== Biography ==
María del Rosario Síntes is an economist who graduated from the University of the Andes. She worked at the Council for Economic and Social Policy (Conpes). She was coordinator of the National Nutrition Plan, manager of the Transport Finance Corporation, deputy minister of Public Works and Transport, vice president of Acerías Paz del Río, of Banco de Bogotá and president of Banco Extebandes, among other positions.

She was Minister of Agriculture in the government of César Gaviria. She would also be Minister of Communications in the government of Andrés Pastrana. She has been a member of several boards of directors of companies.
