= Claude Sintes =

French archaeologist and curator (born 1953)

Claude Sintes (born 10 June 1953) is a French archaeologist and curator.

== Biography ==
Born in Bordj El Kiffan in Algeria, after studying medieval archaeology at the université d'Aix en Provence, Sintes was appointed assistant curator at the Musée d'Arles in 1984. Since 1995, he has been the director of the Musée de l'Arles et de la Provence antiques which set up the exhibitions Algérie antique, Arménie antique, Ingres et l’antique, Chefs d’œuvres romains du Louvre, César : le Rhône pour mémoire, Rodin la lumière de l’antique, and actions in partnership with foreign countries in the field of architectural study and restoration of mosaics (Gaza, Algeria, Turkey, Egypt...), and in the field of museum assistance (Bardo National Museum in Tunis…).

He participated in the French Archaeological Mission to Libya from 1986 to 2003. He conducted underwater excavations at the port of Apollonia, Cyrenaica and published several articles and books on the art and architecture of Ancient Libya. Missions of expertise and international collaborations have led him to Tunisia, Algeria, Spain, etc. He was commissioned by the UNESCO as part of the 2001 Heritage operation, then by ICOMOS in 2006 as part of a reactive mission on the evaluation of Libyan archaeological heritage.

Sintes was a member of the Commission Inter-régionale de l'Archéologie (1995-1998), then a member of the Conseil national de la recherche archéologique (CNRA) from 1999 to 2004. He has been appointed as an expert or member of various boards. He has been an associate researcher at the Camille Julian Centre (CNRS) since 2004.

He participates in the development of discoveries made in the Rhône by multidisciplinary teams: the Arles bust exhibition for example. In 2013, Sintes led the project to extend the departmental museum of ancient Arles, where, on 800 m², a complete Roman barge 30m long discovered in the river is presented.

Sintes is chevalier des Arts et Lettres and was awarded the medal of the Académie d'architecture of Paris and the medal of honour of the city of Arles.

== Publications ==
- Évaluation du patrimoine archéologique d’Arles, Editions of the French Ministry of Culture, 1990
- Sites et monuments de l'Algérie antique, series Archéologies-Edisud, in collaboration with Jean-Marie Blas de Roblès, 2003
- Algérie antique, Éditions du Musée départemental Arles antique, 2003
- La Libye antique, coll. « Découvertes Gallimard » (nº 460), série Archéologie, 2004, ISBN 2-07-030207-5
- Arles antique, Éditions Imprimerie nationale, 2006
- Sur la mer violette, Éditions Les Belles Lettres, 2009
- Libye, un rêve de marbre, Éditions Imprimerie Nationale, 2010, ISBN 978-2-7427-9349-5
- Les Pirates contre Rome, 2016.
